= List of Leica lenses =

The following is a list of lenses manufactured by Leica Camera.

== List of Leica lenses ==
=== Leica screwmount (L39) lenses ===
- Elmar 50 mm f/3.5 collapsible
- Hektor 50 mm f/2.5 collapsible
- Summar 50 mm f/2 collapsible and rigid (very rare)
- Xenon 50 mm f/1.5 rigid
- Summitar 50 mm f/2 collapsible
- Summarit 50 mm f/1.5 rigid
- Summicron 50 mm f/2 collapsible (1953)
- Thambar 90mm ƒ/2.2 soft focus portrait lens (rare)

=== Leica M lenses ===
Summary of Leica M lenses
Speed	Name	21mm	24mm	28mm	35mm	50mm	75mm	90mm	135mm
f/5.6	Summaron			✓					
f/4.0
f/4.0	Super-Angulon	✓							
f/4.0	Macro Elmar							✓	
f/4.0	Elmar							✓	✓
f/4.0	Tele-Elmar								✓
f/4.0	Tri-Elmar ASPH	16-18-21mm							
f/4.0	Tri-Elmar ASPH	28-35-50mm							
f/3.8	Elmar ASPH.		✓						
f/3.5	Summaron				✓				
f/3.4	Super-Elmar ASPH.	✓							
Apo-Telyt									✓
f/2.8	Elmar					✓			
f/2.8	Elmarit	✓		✓				✓	✓
f/2.8	Elmarit ASPH.	✓	✓	✓					
f/2.8	Tele-Elmarit							✓	
f/2.5	Summarit				✓	✓	✓	✓	
f/2	Summicron				✓	✓		✓	
f/2	Summicron ASPH.			✓	✓				
f/2	APO Summicron					✓	✓	✓	
f/1.4	Summilux				✓	✓	✓		
f/1.4	Summilux ASPH.	✓	✓	✓	✓	✓		✓	
f/1.25	Noctilux ASPH.						✓		
f/1.2	Noctilux				✓	✓			
f/1	Noctilux					✓			
f/0.95	Noctilux ASPH.					✓			

- Tri-Elmar-M 16-18-21 mm f/4 ASPH.
- Tri-Elmar-M 28–35–50 mm f/4 ASPH.
- Super-Elmar-M 18 mm f/3.8 ASPH.
- Summilux-M 21 mm f/1.4 ASPH.
- Elmarit-M 21 mm f/2.8
- Elmarit-M 21 mm f/2.8 ASPH.
- Super-Angulon-M f/3.4
- Super-Angulon-M f/4.0
- Summilux-M 24 mm f/1.4 ASPH.
- Elmarit-M 24 mm f/2.8 ASPH.
- Elmar-M 24 mm f/3.8 ASPH.
- Summaron-M 28mm f/5.6.
- Summilux-M 28 mm f/1.4 ASPH.
- Summicron-M 28 mm f/2 ASPH.
- Elmarit-M 28 mm f/2.8
- Elmarit-M 28 mm f/2.8 ASPH.
- Noctilux-M 35mm f/1.2 ASPH
- Summilux 35 mm f/1.4
- Summilux-M 35 mm f/1.4 ASPH.
- Summicron-M 35 mm f/2
- Summicron-M 35 mm f/2 ASPH.
- Summarit-M 35 mm f/2.5
- Summaron-M 35 mm f/3.5
- Noctilux-M 50 mm f/0.95 ASPH.
- Noctilux-M 50 mm f/1
- Noctilux-M 50 mm f/1.2
- Noctilux-M 75 mm f/1.25
- Summilux 50 mm f/1.4
- Summilux-M 50 mm f/1.4 ASPH.
- Summarit 50 mm f/1.5
- Summicron-M 50 mm f/2
- Apo-Summicron-M 50 mm f/2 ASPH.
- Summarit-M 50 mm f/2.5
- Elmar-M 50 mm f/2.8
- Summilux-M 75 mm f/1.4
- Apo-Summicron-M 75 mm f/2 ASPH.
- Summarit-M 75 mm f/2.5

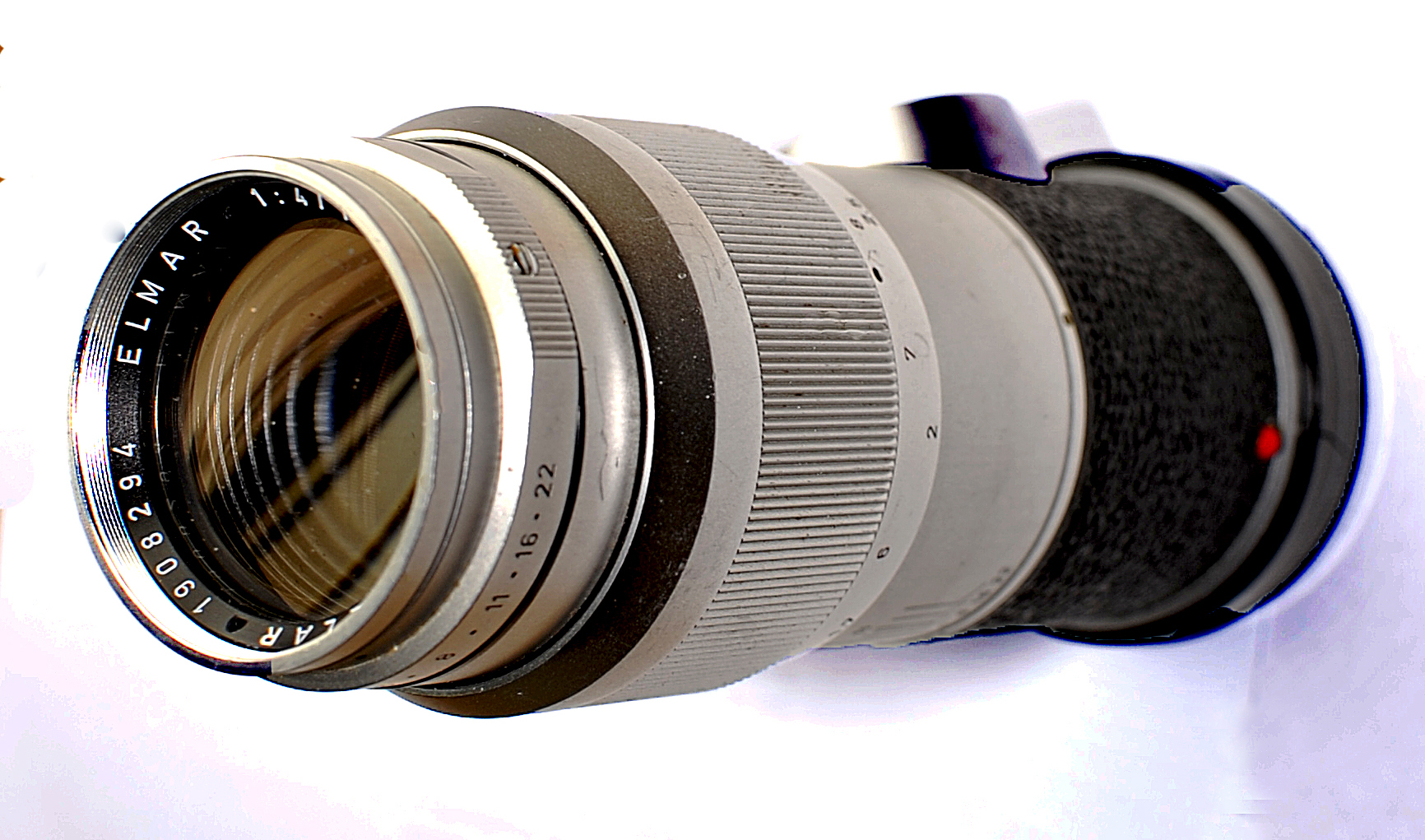
Elmar 135 mm f/4.0

- Elmarit-M 90 mm f/2.8
- Apo-Summicron-M 90 mm f/2 ASPH.
- Summarit-M 90 mm f/2.5
- Macro-Elmar-M 90 mm f/4
- Elmarit-M 135 mm f/2.8
- Apo-Telyt-M 135 mm f/3.4
- Elmar 135 mm f/4.0
- Hektor 135 mm f/4.5

Note: Noctilux means f/0.95-f/1.2, Summilux means f/1.4, Summicron means f/2, Summarit means f/2.5 in the current lineup (f/1.5 in one of the 50 mm), Elmarit means f/2.8, and Elmar means f/3.5-f/4. Noct, Lux and Cron are commonly used as short forms for Noctilux, Summilux and Summicron, respectively. For example, 50 Cron uniquely identifies the Summicron-M 50 mm f/2 construction, although the exact version is not specified. Many Leica M lenses went through several revisions through the years.

=== Leica R lenses ===
- Leica 15 mm f/3.5 Super-Elmar-R – 1980 (Carl Zeiss design)
- Leica 15 mm f/2.8 Super-Elmarit-R ASPH – 2001
- Leica 16 mm f/2.8 Fisheye-Elmarit-R – 1970 (Minolta design and glass production)

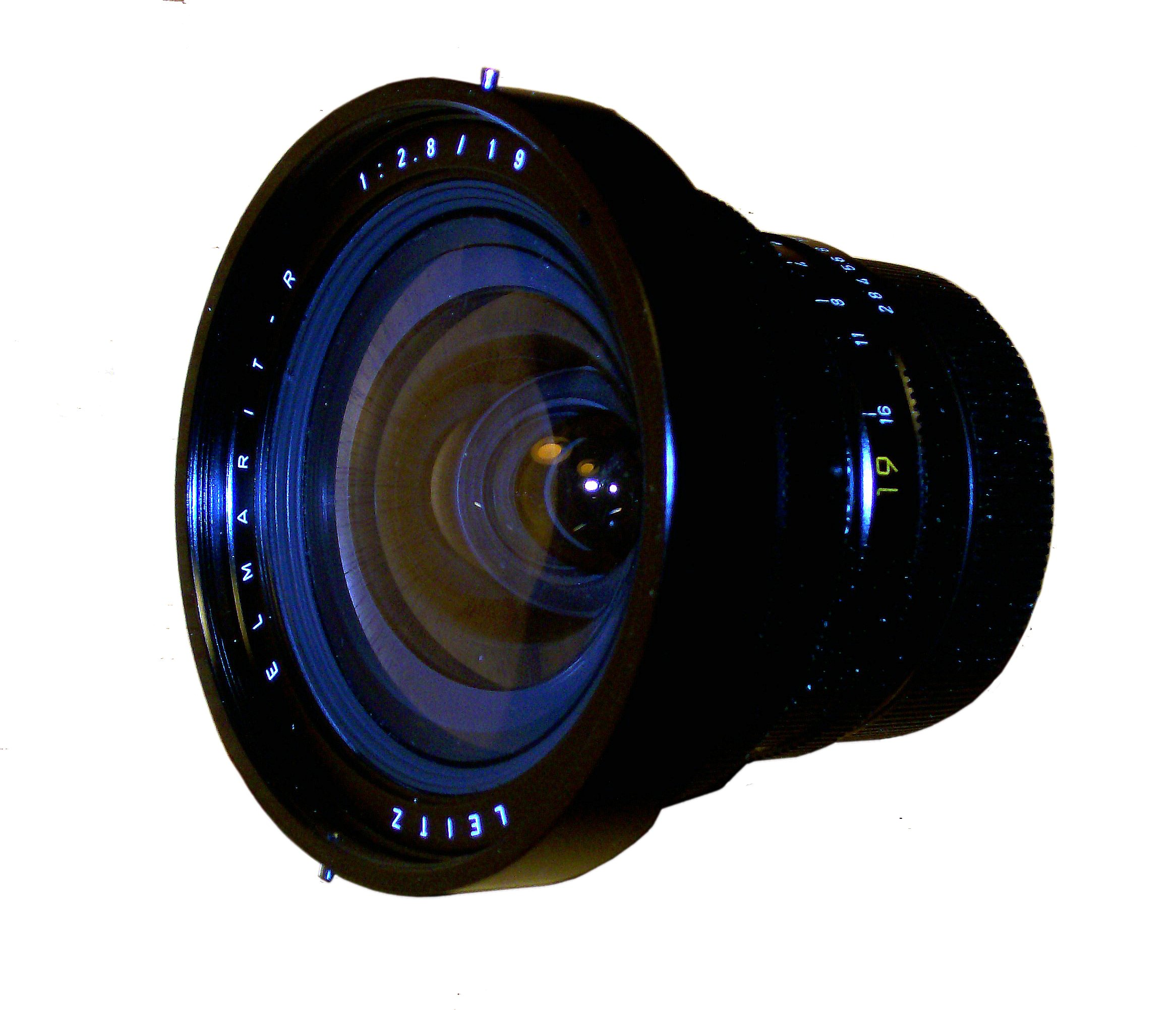
Ernst Leitz Canada Elmarit R19/2.8

- Leica 19 mm f/2.8 Elmarit-R 1st version
- Leica 19 mm f/2.8 Elmarit-R 2nd version – 1990
- Leica 21 mm f/4.0 Super-Angulon-R – 1968–1992 (Schneider-Kreuznach design)
- Leica 21 mm f/3.4 Super-Angulon-R – 1968 (Schneider-Kreuznach design)
- Leica 24 mm f/2.8 Elmarit-R – 1970 (Minolta design and glass production)
- Leica 28 mm f/2.8 PC-Super-Angulon-R (Schneider-Kreuznach design)
- Leica 28 mm f/2.8 Elmarit-R 1st version – 1970
- Leica 28 mm f/2.8 Elmarit-R 2nd version – 1994
- Leica 35 mm f/4.0 PA-Curtagon-R (Schneider-Kreuznach design)
- Leica 35 mm f/2.8 Elmarit-R 1st version – 1964
- Leica 35 mm f/2.8 Elmarit-R 2nd version
- Leica 35 mm f/2.8 Elmarit-R 3rd version
- Leica 35 mm f/2.8 Elmarit-R 4th version (Built-in lens hood; 55mm filter)
- Leica 35 mm f/2.0 Summicron-R 1st version – 1970
- Leica 35 mm f/2.0 Summicron-R 2nd version – 1976
- Leica 35 mm f/1.4 Summilux-R

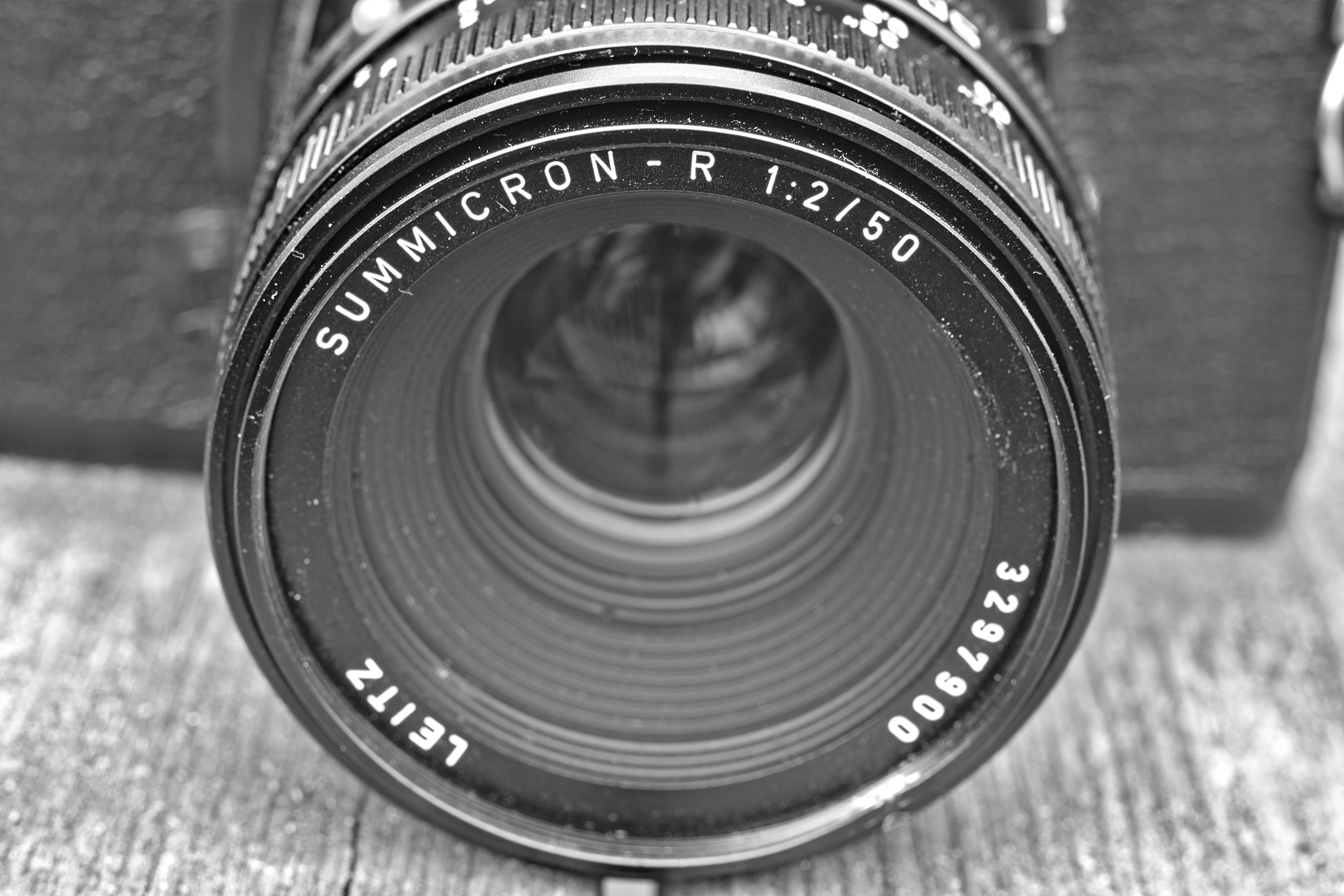
Summicron 2.0, Leitz Canada

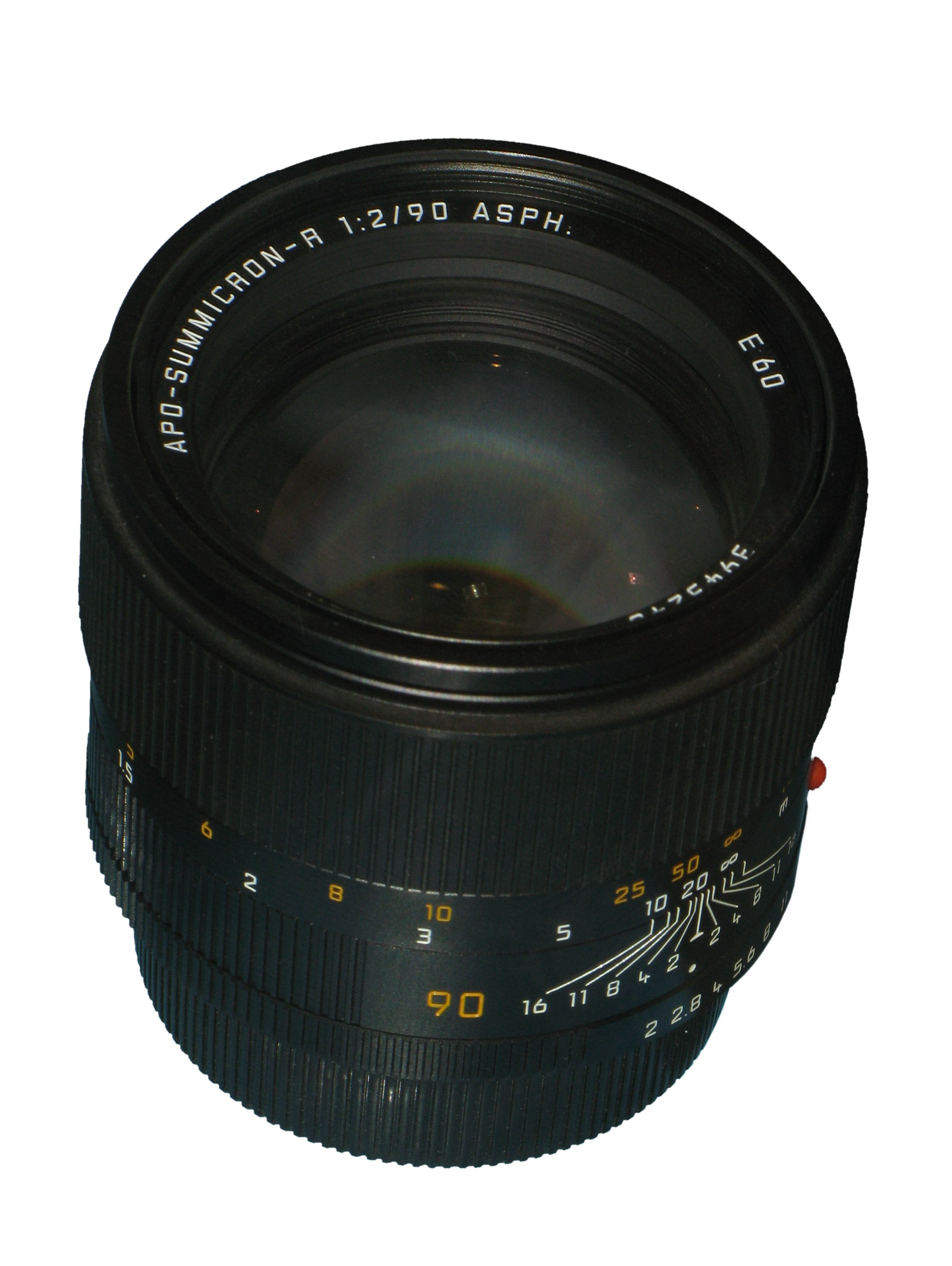
90 mm APO-Summicron-R ASPH (2002)

- Leica 50 mm f/2.0 Summicron-R 1st version – 1964
- Leica 50 mm f/2.0 Summicron-R 2nd version – 1977 (built-in lens hood, 3-cam and R-cam only version)
- Leica 50 mm f/1.4 Summilux-R 1st version
- Leica 50 mm f/1.4 Summilux-R 2nd version
- Leica 50 mm f/1.4 Summilux-R 3rd version – 1997 (ROM contacts)
- Leica 60 mm Macro-Elmarit-R 1st version – 1972 – outside bayonet lens hood fitting
- Leica 60 mm Macro-Elmarit-R dn2 version
- Leica 75 mm f/2.0 Elcan-R code C-341 – extremely rare
- Leica 80mm f/1.4 Summilux-R

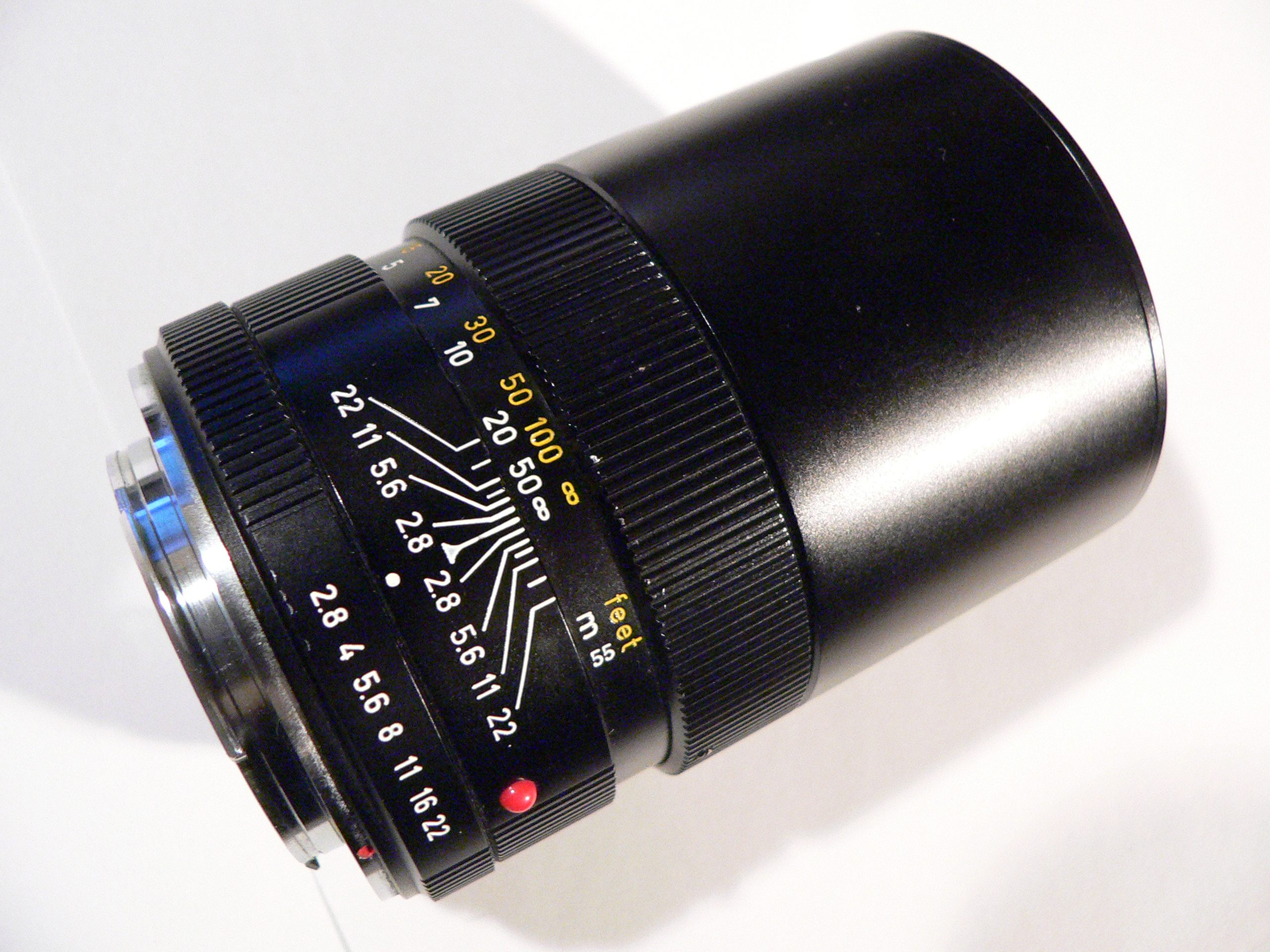
Elmarit-R 135 mm

- Leica 90 mm f/2.8 Elmarit-R 1st version – 1964–1996
- Leica 90 mm f/2.8 Elmarit-R 2nd version – 1983
- Leica 90 mm Summicron-R 1st version – 1969
- Leica 90 mm Summicron-R 2nd version –
- Leica 90 mm APO-Summicron-R ASPH – 2002
- Leica 90 mm f/1.0 Elcan-R – extremely rare
- Leica 100 mm f/4.0 Macro-Elmar-R bellows version
- Leica 100 mm f/4.0 Macro-Elmar-R helical version
- Leica 100 mm f/2.8 APO-Macro-Elmarit-R
- Leica 135 mm Elmarit-R 1st version – 1965
- Leica 135 mm Elmarit-R 2nd version

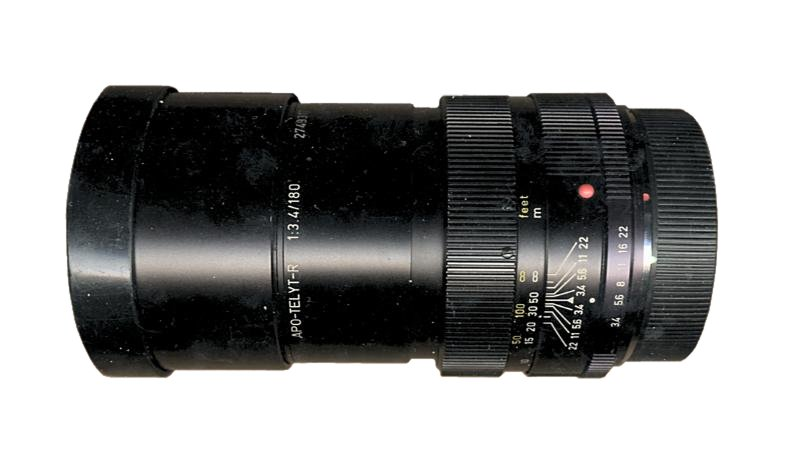
Lens APO Telyt R 3.4/180 (by Walter Mandler)

- Leica 180 mm f/4 Elmar-R – 1976
- Leica 180 mm f/2.8 Elmarit-R 1st version
- Leica 180 mm f/2.8 Elmarit-R 2nd version
- Leica 180 mm f/3.4 APO-Telyt-R – 1975–1998
- Leica 180 mm f/2.8 APO-Elmarit-R – 1998
- Leica 180 mm f/2.0 APO-Summicron-R
- Leica 180 mm f/3.4 Elcan-R code C-303 – extremely rare
- Leica 250 mm f/4.0 Telyt-R 1st version
- Leica 250 mm f/4.0 Telyt-R 2nd version
- Leica 280 mm f/4.8 Telyt-V
- Leica 280 mm f/4.0 APO-Telyt-R
- Leica 280 mm f/2.8 APO-Telyt-R – 1984–1997
- Leica 350 mm f/4.8 Telyt-R
- Leica 400 mm f/6.8 Telyt-R – 1968–1994
- Leica 400 mm f/5.6 Telyt-R
- Leica 400 mm f/2.8 APO-Telyt-R – 1992–96
- Leica 450 mm f/5.6 Elcan-R, code C-329 – extremely rare
- Leica 500 mm f/8 MR-Telyt-R
- Leica 560 mm f/6.8 Telyt-R – 1971–1995
- Leica 560 mm f/5.6 Telyt-R – 1966–1973
- Leica 800mm f/6.3 Telyt-S – 1972–1995 (sold, during a promotional campaign, with a "free tripod" — a VW Fox)
- Leica modular APO-Telyt-R 260/400/560 head
- Leica modular APO-Telyt-R 400/560/800 head

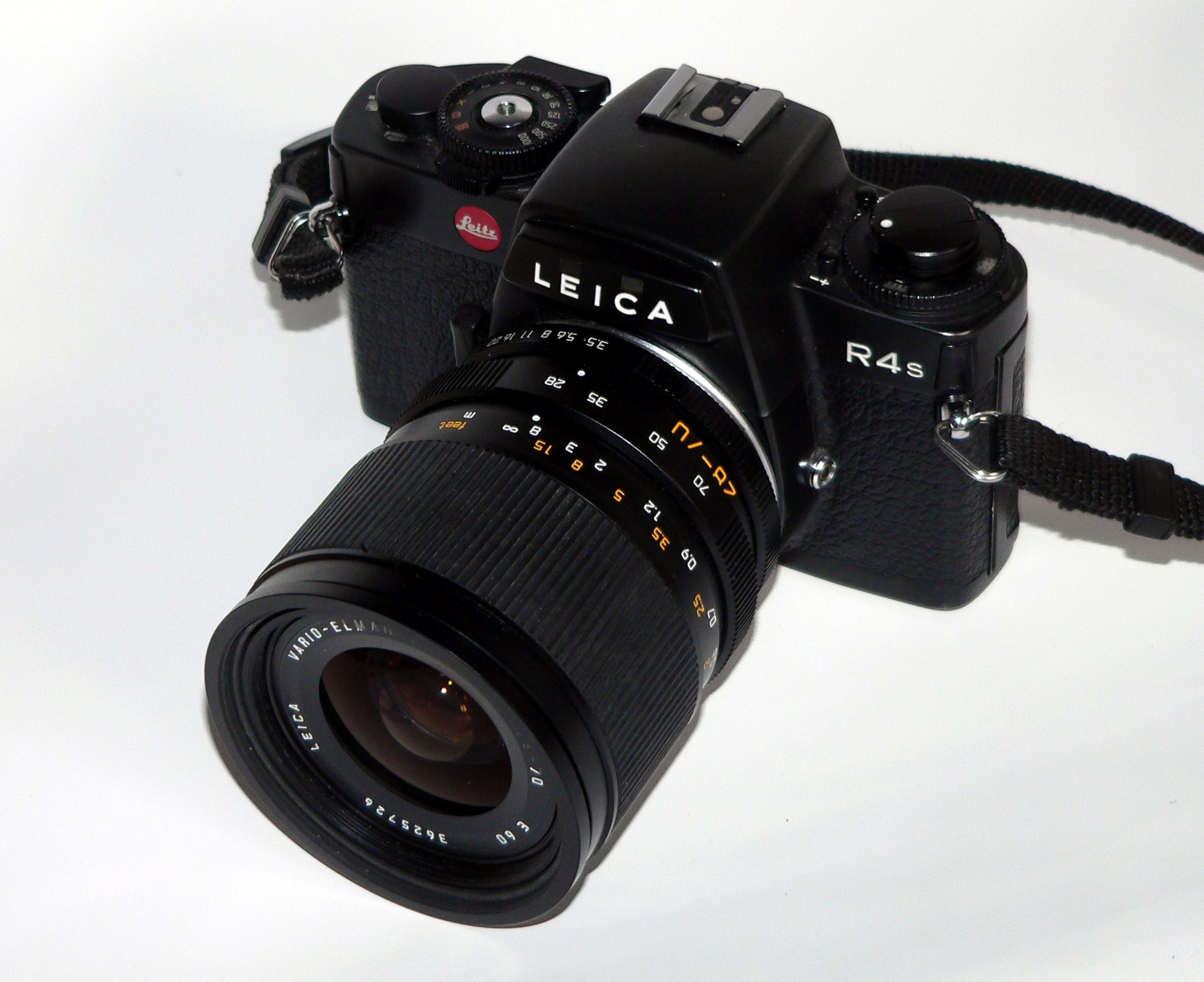
Vario Elmar 3.5–4.5/28–70 mm (with a R4s)

- Leica 21 mm–35 mm f/3.5–f/4.0 Vario-Elmar-R zoom – 2002
- Leica 28 mm–70 mm f/3.5–4.5 Vario-Elmar-R zoom
- Leica 28 mm-90 mm f/2.8-4.5 Vario-Elmarit-R ASPH
- Leica 70–180 mm f/2.8 Vario-APO-Elmarit-R zoom
- Leica 35–70 f/4.0 Vario-Elmar-R zoom
- Leica 35–70 mm f/3.5 Vario-Elmar-R zoom (Minolta design and glass production)
- Leica 35–70 mm f/2.8 Vario-Elmarit-R ASPH zoom – 2000 (only 200 were made)
- Leica 70–210 mm f/4.0 Vario-Elmar-R zoom (Minolta design and glass production)
- Leica 75–200 mm f/4.5 Vario-Elmar-R – 1976–1984 (Minolta design and glass production)
- Leica 80–200 mm f/4.5 Vario-Elmar-R zoom
- Leica 80–200 mm f/4.0 Vario-Elmar-R zoom
- Leica 105–280 mm f/4.2 Vario-Elmar-R zoom

=== Leica S lenses ===
- Super-Elmar-S 1:3.5/24 mm ASPH.
- Elmarit-S 1:2.8/30 mm ASPH.
- Elmarit-S 1:2.8/30 mm ASPH. CS
- Summarit-S 1:2.5/35 mm ASPH.
- Summarit-S 1:2.5/35 mm ASPH. CS
- Elmarit-S 1:2.8/45 mm ASPH.
- Elmarit-S 1:2.8/45 mm ASPH. CS
- Summarit-S 1:2.5/70 mm ASPH.
- Summarit-S 1:2.5/70 mm ASPH. CS
- Summicron-S 1:2/100 mm ASPH.
- Apo-Macro-Summarit-S 1:2.5/120 mm
- Apo-Macro-Summarit-S 1:2.5/120 mm CS
- TS-APO-Elmar-S 1:5.6/120 mm ASPH. (Schneider-Kreuznach design)
- Apo-Elmar-S 1:3.5/180 mm ASPH.
- Apo-Elmar-S 1:3.5/180 mm ASPH. CS
- Vario-Elmar-S 1:3.5-5.6/30–90 mm ASPH.

=== Leica SL lenses (for L-mount, full frame) ===
- Summilux-SL 1:1.4 / 50 ASPH.
- APO-Summicron-SL 1:2 / 21 ASPH.
- APO-Summicron-SL 1:2 / 24 ASPH. (According to the Leica roadmap for 2020)
- APO-Summicron-SL 1:2 / 28 ASPH.
- APO-Summicron-SL 1:2 / 35 ASPH.
- Summicron-SL 1:2 / 35 ASPH
- APO-Summicron-SL 1:2 / 50 ASPH.
- Summicron-SL 1:2 / 50 ASPH
- APO-Summicron-SL 1:2 / 75 ASPH.
- APO-Summicron-SL 1:2 / 90 ASPH.
- Super-Vario-Elmarit-SL 1:2.8 / 14-24 ASPH
- Super-Vario-Elmar-SL 1:3.5–4.5 / 16–35 ASPH.
- Vario-Elmarit-SL 1:2.8 24-70 ASPH
- Vario-Elmarit-SL 1:2.8–4 / 24–90 ASPH.
- APO-Vario-Elmarit-SL 1:2.8–4 / 90–280
- Vario-Elmar-SL 1:5-6.3 100-400

=== Leica Summilux-C Lenses (PL mount cinema lenses) ===
- 16 mm T/1.4
- 18 mm T/1.4
- 21 mm T/1.4
- 25 mm T/1.4
- 29 mm T/1.4
- 35 mm T/1.4
- 40 mm T/1.4
- 50 mm T/1.4
- 65 mm T/1.4
- 75 mm T/1.4
- 100 mm T/1.4
- 135 mm T/1.4

=== Leica Summicron-C Lenses (PL mount cinema lenses) ===
- 15 mm T/2.0
- 18 mm T/2.0
- 21 mm T/2.0
- 25 mm T/2.0
- 29 mm T/2.0
- 35 mm T/2.0
- 40 mm T/2.0
- 50 mm T/2.0
- 75 mm T/2.0
- 100 mm T/2.0
- 135 mm T/2.0
