= Gindler =

Gindler is a surname. Notable people with the surname include:

- David Gindler, American lawyer and philanthropist
- Elsa Gindler (1885–1961), German somatic bodywork pioneer
- Kiki Ramos Gindler, American philanthropist

== See also ==
- Gandler, another surname
- Gendler, another surname
