= Gandler =

Gandler is a surname. Notable people with the surname include:

- Markus Gandler (born 1966), Austrian cross-country skier
- Rudolf Gandler, Austrian Paralympic athlete
- Stefan Gandler (born 1964), German philosopher and social scientist

== See also ==
- Gendler, another surname
- Gindler, another surname
- Mandler, another surname
