= Summarit =

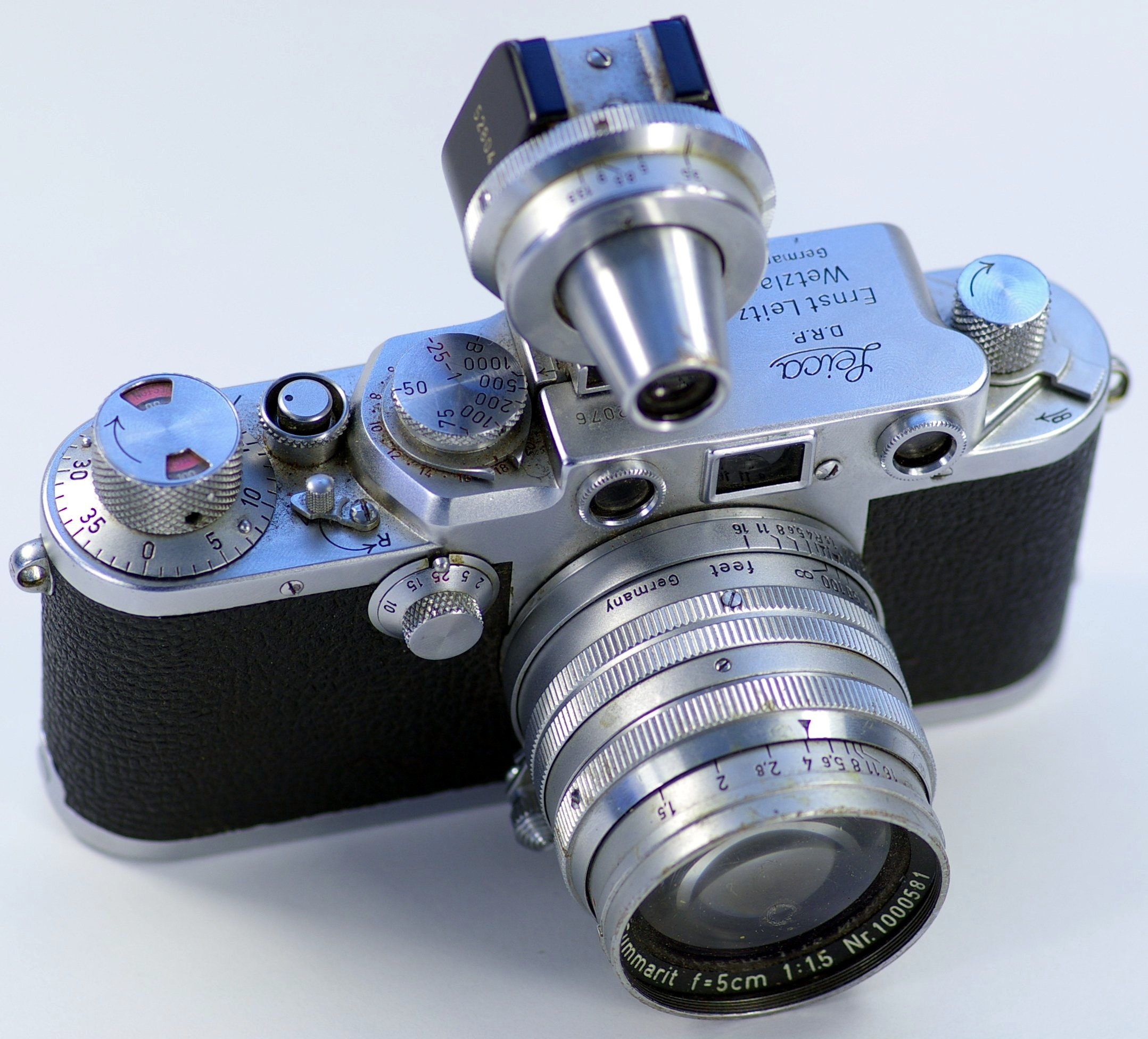
Leica IIIf with the Summarit 50 mm f/1.5.

The name Summarit is used by Leica to designate camera lenses that have a maximum aperture of f/2.4. The name has been in use since 1949.

== History ==
The Summarit was initially introduced as Leica's fastest lens in 1949 with a maximum aperture of f/1.5. Since then, the Noctilux and Summilux named lenses have superseded this old aperture.

On 3 August 2007 Leica revived the name and announced a series of less expensive lenses, the Summarit-M. The Summarit-M lenses work on Leica M-series film and digital rangefinder cameras.

== Description ==
In its current iteration the Summarit lenses have a maximum f-number of f/2.4.

== Market positions ==
Leica introduced these less expensive lenses, which also fit Leica M mount cameras like the recent Cosina (Carl Zeiss AG and Voigtländer brands) lenses as an alternative to its main line professional and expensive lenses.

== List of Summarit lenses ==
For the M39 lens mount

- Summarit 50 mm f/1.5

For the Leica M mount

- Summarit-M 50 mm f/1.5
- Summarit-M 35 mm f/2.4 ASPH.
- Summarit-M 50 mm f/2.4
- Summarit-M 75 mm f/2.4
- Summarit-M 90 mm f/2.4

For the Leica S mount

- Summarit-S 35 mm f/2.5 ASPH.
- Summarit-S 35 mm f/2.5 ASPH. CS
- Summarit-S 70 mm f/2.5 ASPH.
- Summarit-S 70 mm f/2.5 ASPH. CS
- Summicron-S 100 mm f/2.5 ASPH.
- Apo-Macro-Summarit-S 120 mm f/2.5
- Apo-Macro-Summarit-S 120 mm f/2.5 CS
