= Elmarit =

Brand name for Leica camera lenses

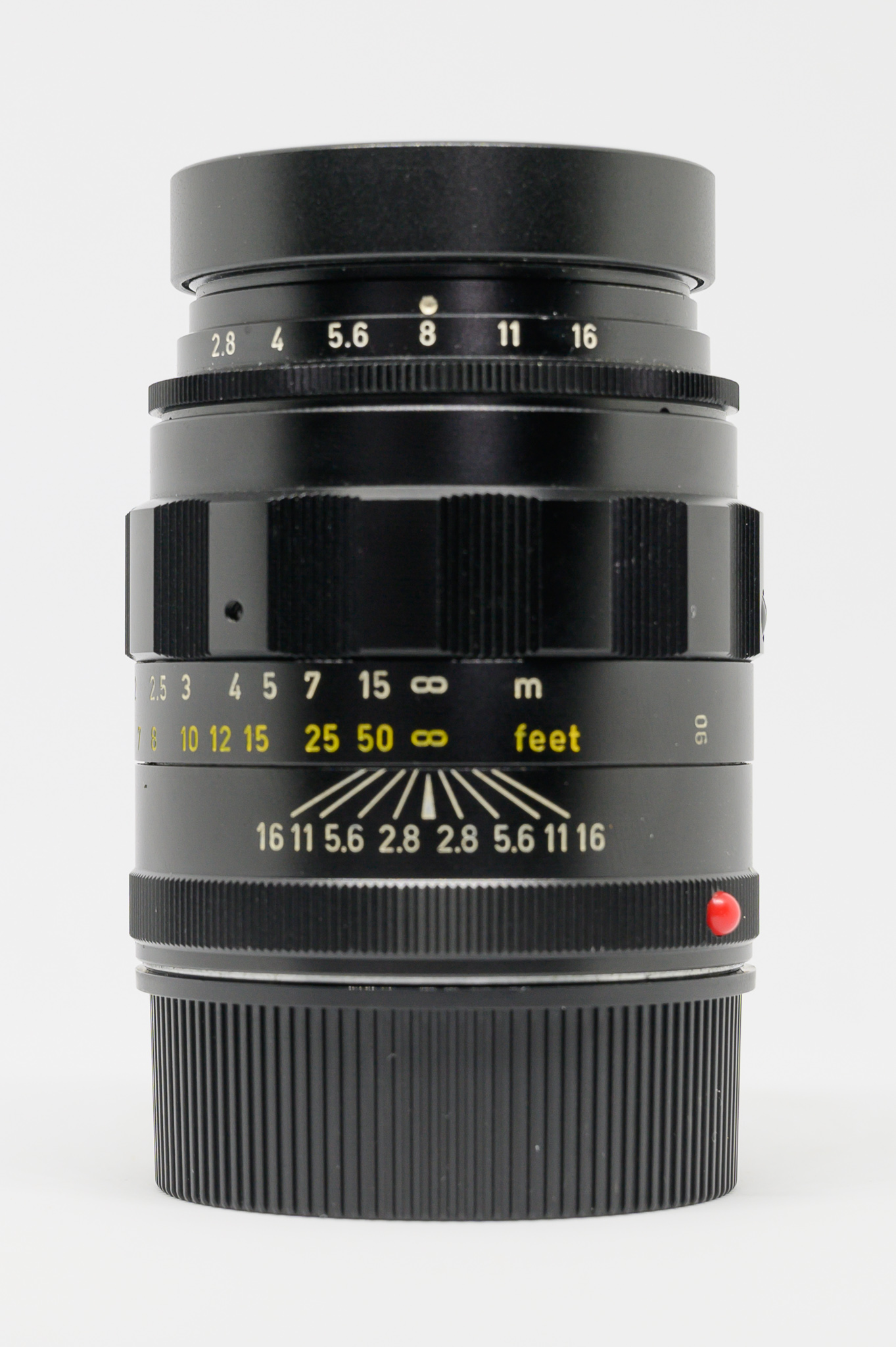
Leica Elmarit-M 90 mm f/2.8

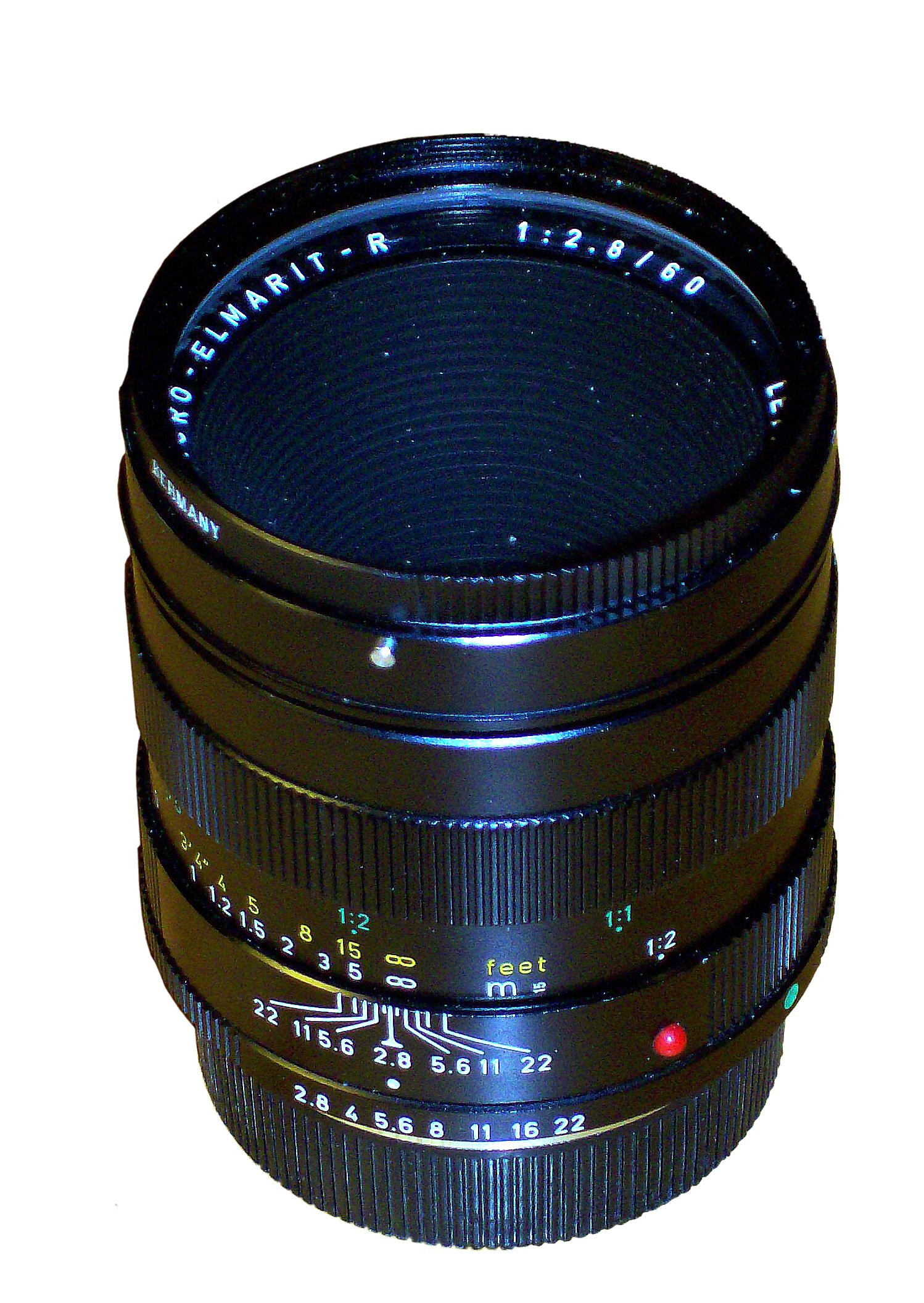
Leica Macro Elmarit-R 60 mm f/2.8

The name Elmarit is used by Leica to designate camera lenses that have a maximum aperture of f/2.8.

== History ==
The Elmarit is a derivation of the Elmar. Confusingly not all f/2.8 lenses are Elmarits. The 50 mm f/2.8 collapsible, manufactured until 2007, was designated an Elmar rather than an Elmarit.

== Description ==
The Elmarit are popular lenses for extreme focal lengths: 21 mm, 24 mm, 28 mm and 90 mm. The Elmarit has also come in 135mm super-telephoto.

== Market positions ==
The Elmarit are behind the Summicron and the Summarit lenses. Only the Elmar and most Summaron lenses have a smaller f-number.

== List of Elmarit lenses ==
For the Leica M mount

- Elmarit-M 21 mm f/2.8
- Elmarit-M 21 mm f/2.8 ASPH.
- Elmarit-M 24 mm f/2.8 ASPH.
- Elmarit-M 28 mm f/2.8
- Elmarit-M 28 mm f/2.8 ASPH.
- Elmarit-M 90 mm f/2.8
- Elmarit-M 135 mm f/2.8

For the Leica R mount

- Leica 15 mm f/2.8 Super-Elmarit-R ASPH – 2001
- Leica 16 mm f/2.8 Fisheye-Elmarit-R – 1970 (Minolta design and glass production)
- Leica 19 mm f/2.8 Elmarit-R 1st version
- Leica 19 mm f/2.8 Elmarit-R 2nd version – 1990
- Leica 24 mm f/2.8 Elmarit-R – 1970 (Minolta design and glass production)
- Leica 28 mm f/2.8 Elmarit-R 1st version – 1970
- Leica 28 mm f/2.8 Elmarit-R 2nd version – 1994
- Leica 35 mm f/2.8 Elmarit-R 1st version – 1964
- Leica 35 mm f/2.8 Elmarit-R 2nd version
- Leica 35 mm f/2.8 Elmarit-R 3rd version
- Leica 35 mm f/2.8 Elmarit-R 4th version (Built-in lens hood; 55mm filter)
- Leica 60 mm Macro-Elmarit-R 1st version – 1972 – outside bayonet lens hood fitting
- Leica 60 mm Macro-Elmarit-R dn2 version
- Leica 90 mm f/2.8 Elmarit-R 1st version – 1964–1996
- Leica 90 mm f/2.8 Elmarit-R 2nd version – 1983
- Leica 100 mm f/2.8 APO-Macro-Elmarit-R
- Leica 135 mm Elmarit-R 1st version – 1965
- Leica 135 mm Elmarit-R 2nd version
- Leica 180 mm f/2.8 Elmarit-R 1st version
- Leica 180 mm f/2.8 Elmarit-R 2nd version
- Leica 180 mm f/2.8 APO-Elmarit-R – 1998
- Leica 28 mm-90 mm f/2.8-4.5 Vario-Elmarit-R ASPH
- Leica 70–180 mm f/2.8 Vario-APO-Elmarit-R zoom
- Leica 35–70 mm f/2.8 Vario-Elmarit-R ASPH zoom – 2000 (only 200 were made)

For the Leica S mount

- Super-Elmar-S 1:3.5/24 mm ASPH.
- Elmarit-S 1:2.8/30 mm ASPH.
- Elmarit-S 1:2.8/30 mm ASPH. CS
- Elmarit-S 1:2.8/45 mm ASPH.
- Elmarit-S 1:2.8/45 mm ASPH. CS

For the Leica L Mount

- Elmarit-TL 18 mm f/2.8 ASPH.
- APO-Macro-Elmarit-TL 60 f/2.8 ASPH.
- Vario-Elmarit-SL 24-70 f/2.8 ASPH.
- Vario-Elmarit-SL 1:2.8–4 / 24–90 ASPH.
- APO-Vario-Elmarit-SL 1:2.8–4 / 90–280

For the Four Thirds mount (Note: manufactured under license by Panasonic)

- D Vario-Elmarit 14–50 mm f/2.8-3.5

For the Micro Four Thirds mount

- DG Vario-Elmarit 8–18 mm f/2.8-4.0
- DG Vario-Elmarit 12–35 mm f/2.8 Asph. Power OIS
- DG Vario-Elmarit 12–60 mm f/2.8-4.0
- DG Macro-Elmarit 45 mm f/2.8 Asph OIS
- DG Vario-Elmarit 50–200 mm f/2.8-4.0 Asph. Power OIS
- DG Elmarit 200 mm f/2.8 OIS
