= Gendler =

Gendler is a surname. Notable people with the surname include:

- Arkady Gendler (1921–2017), Ukrainian Yiddish-language singer, composer, and folk song collector
- Everett Gendler (1928–2022), American rabbi
- Noah Gal Gendler (born 1957), Israeli diplomat
- Robert Gendler (born 1957), American physician, amateur astronomer, author, and astrophotographer
- Tamar Gendler (born 1965), American academic and philosopher

== See also ==
- Gandler, another surname
- Gindler, another surname
