= Mandler =

Surname list

Mandler is a surname. Notable people with the surname include:

- Albert Mandler (1929–1973), Israeli general
- Anthony Mandler (born 1973), American music video director
- George Mandler (1924–2016), American psychologist
- James Mandler (1922–2007), American basketball player
- Jean Matter Mandler (born 1929), American psychologist
- Peter Mandler (born 1958), British historian and academic
- Walter Mandler (1922–2005), lens designer
