= Summaron =

Leica camera lenses

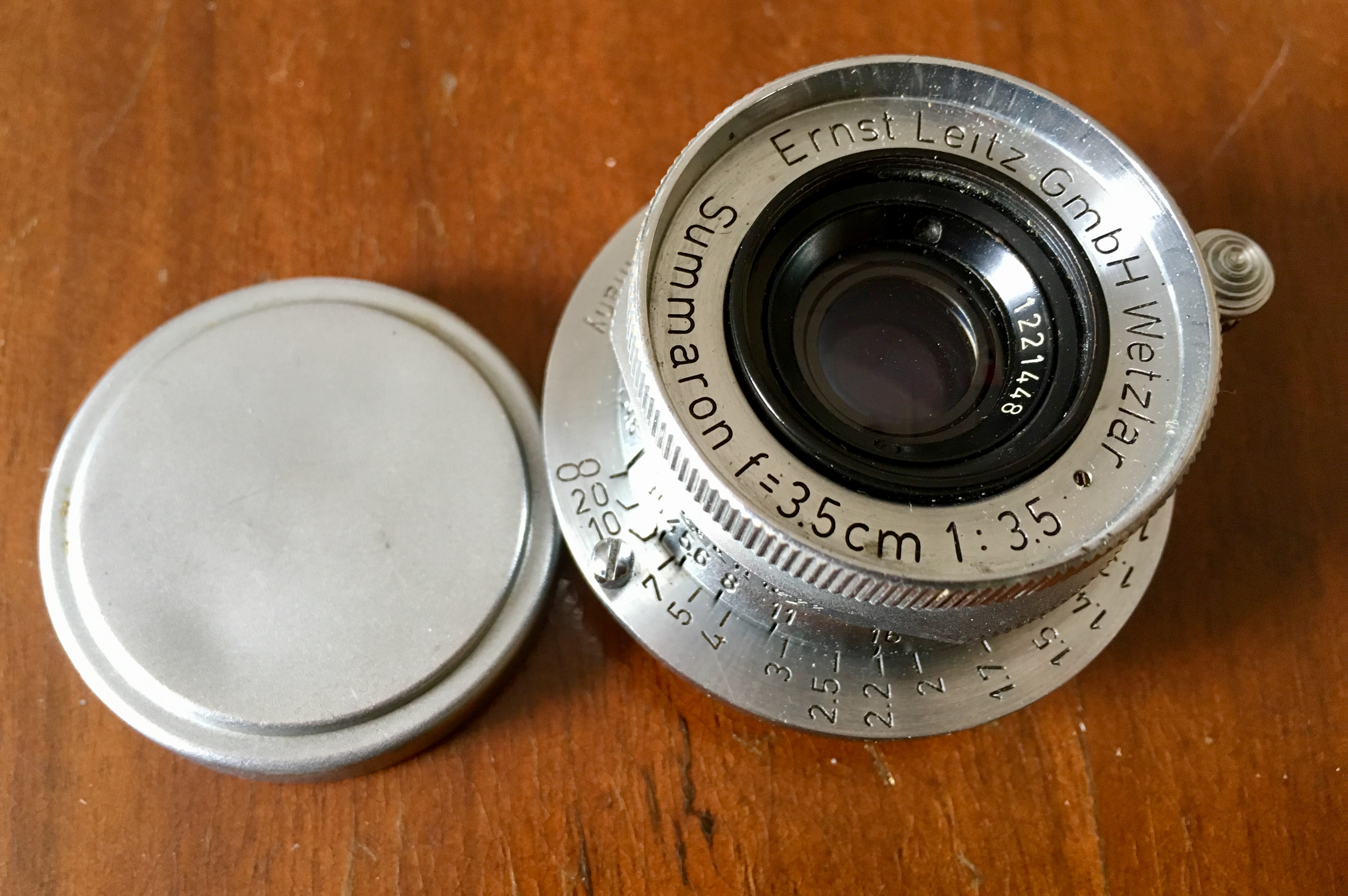
The Leica Summaron 35 mm f/3.5 screw mount introduced in 1948

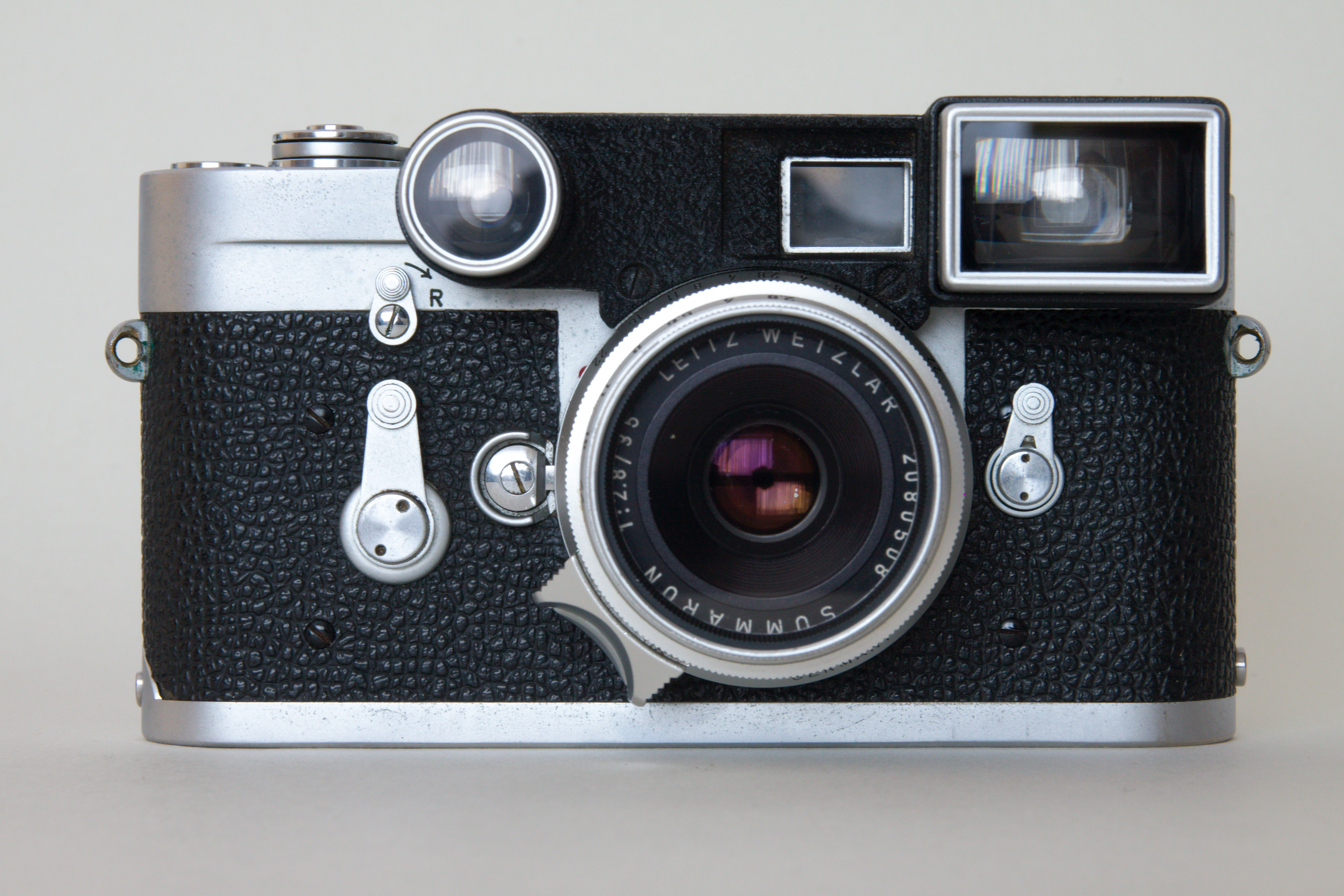
The Leica M3 with the Summaron 35 mm f/2.8 with its googles, from 1958

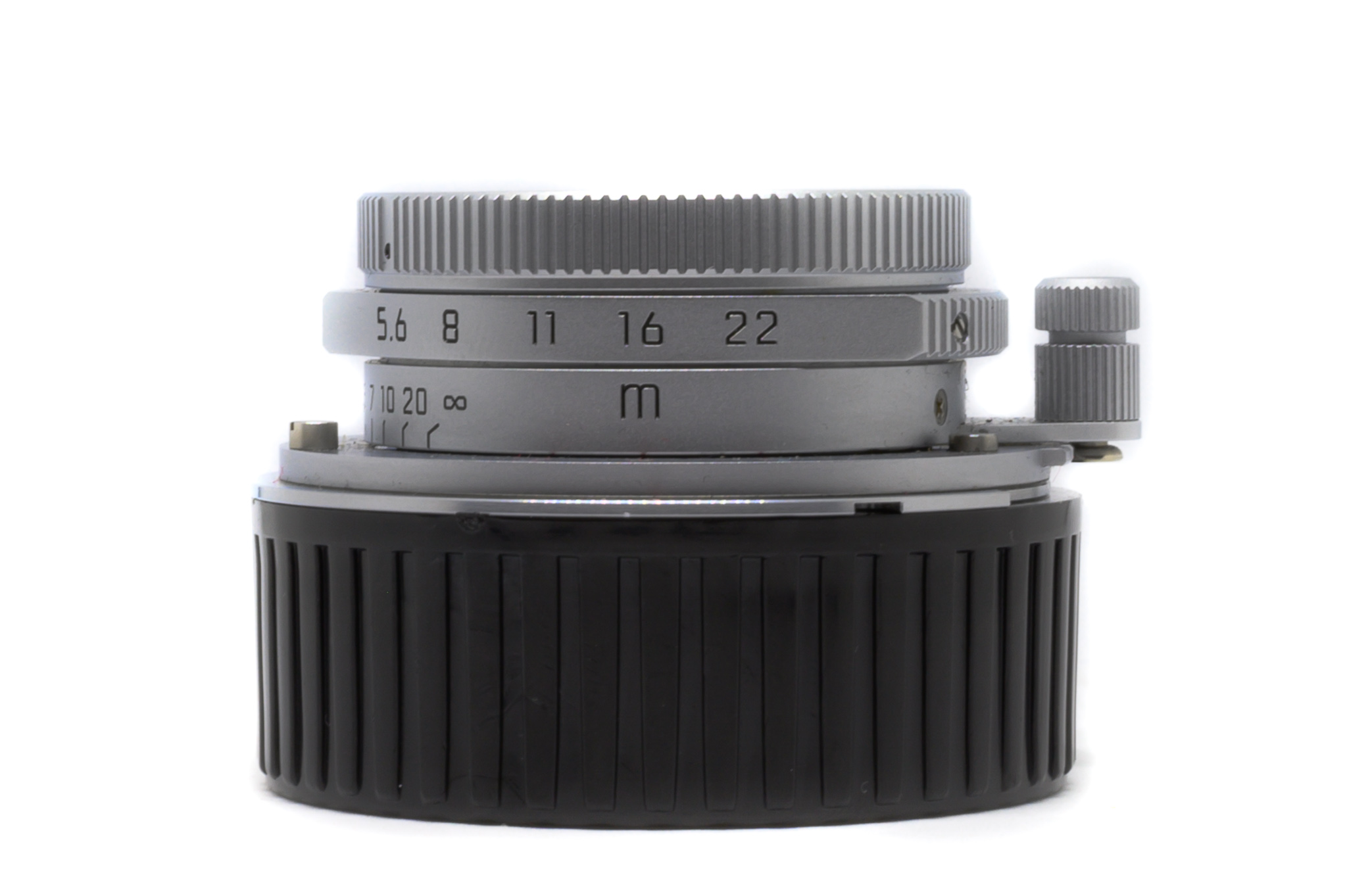
Leica Summaron 28 mm f/5.6 introduced in 2016

The name Summaron is used by Leica to designate camera lenses that have a maximum aperture of f/2.8 or f/3.5 or f/5.6.

== History ==
The Summaron 35 mm f/3.5 was introduced in 1945. It was manufactured both for the Leica screwmount cameras and Leica M cameras. It was manufactured until the 1960s and over 100,000 units were produced, making it one of the most common Leica wide-angle lenses ever made. The lens was then discontinued in 1963 just before the first 28mm f/2.8 Elmarit became available for the M cameras.

The Summaron name was revived in 2016 when the 28 mm f/5.6 was released.

== Description ==
Several lens has been designated with the name Summaron, confusingly with a variety of f-numbers. The only thing in common between these lenses were that they were generally wide-angle and extremely small (sometimes referred to as pancake lenses).

== Market positions ==
The Summaron are some of the smallest lens in the Leica range, but because of its low maximum aperture it is cheaper than other lenses.

== List of Summaron lenses ==
For the M39 lens mount

Name	Focal length	Year	f-number	Filter size	Weight
Leica Summaron 35 mm f/3.5	35 mm	1948 – 1960	f/3.5	39 mm	195 grams
Leica Summaron 28 mm f/5.6	28 mm	1955 – 1963	f/5.6	28 mm	150 grams

For the Leica M mount

Name	Focal length	Year	f-number	Filter size	Weight
Leica Summaron 35 mm f/3.5	35 mm	1956 – 1960	f/3.5	39 mm	195 grams
Leica Summaron 35 mm f/2.8	35 mm	1958 – 1974	f/2.8	39 mm	210 grams
Leica Summaron 28 mm f/5.6	28 mm	2016 – present	f/5.6	34 mm	165 grams
