= Summicron =

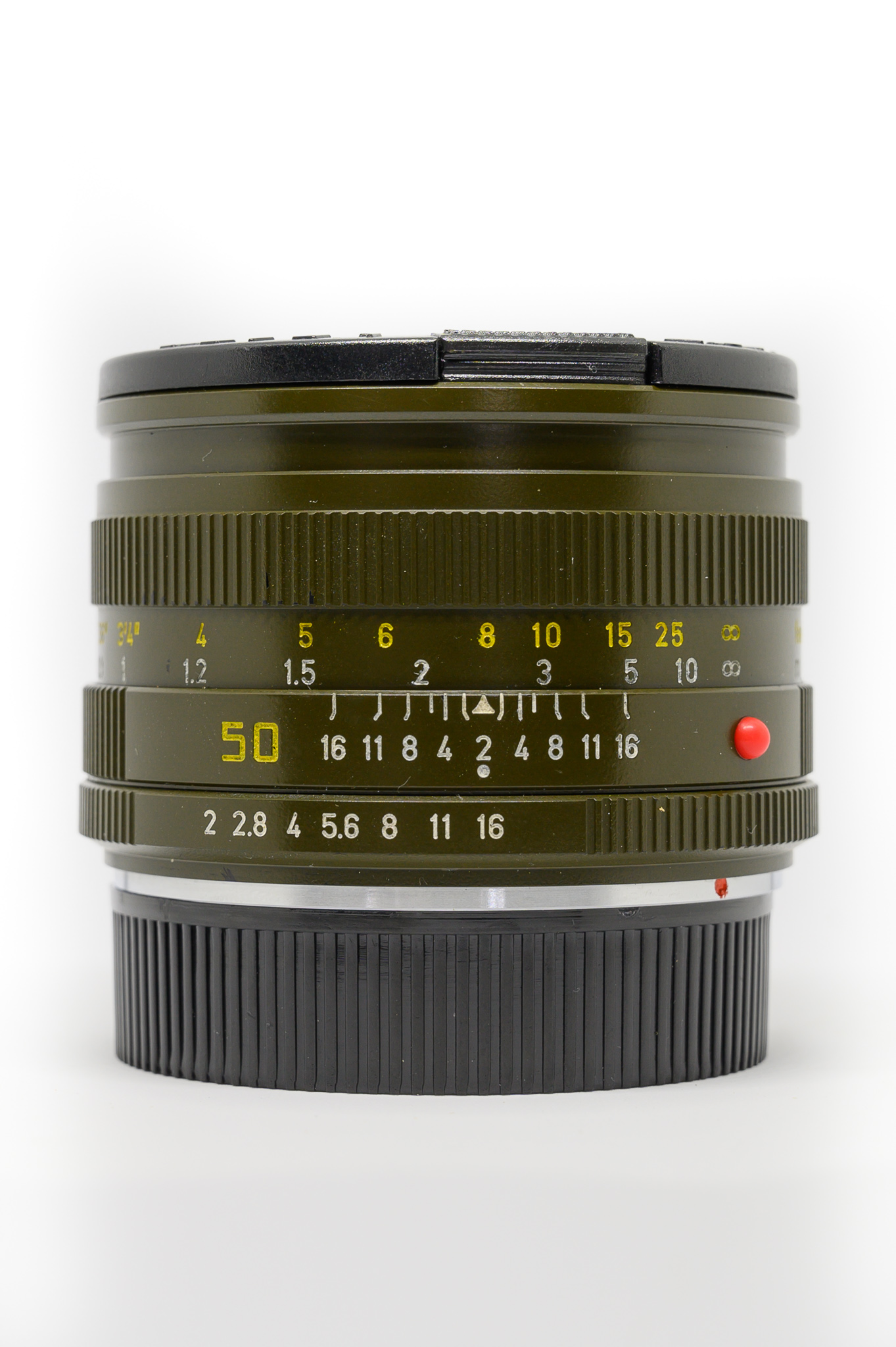
Leica Summicron-R 50 mm f/2 II 'Safari' edition from 1978.

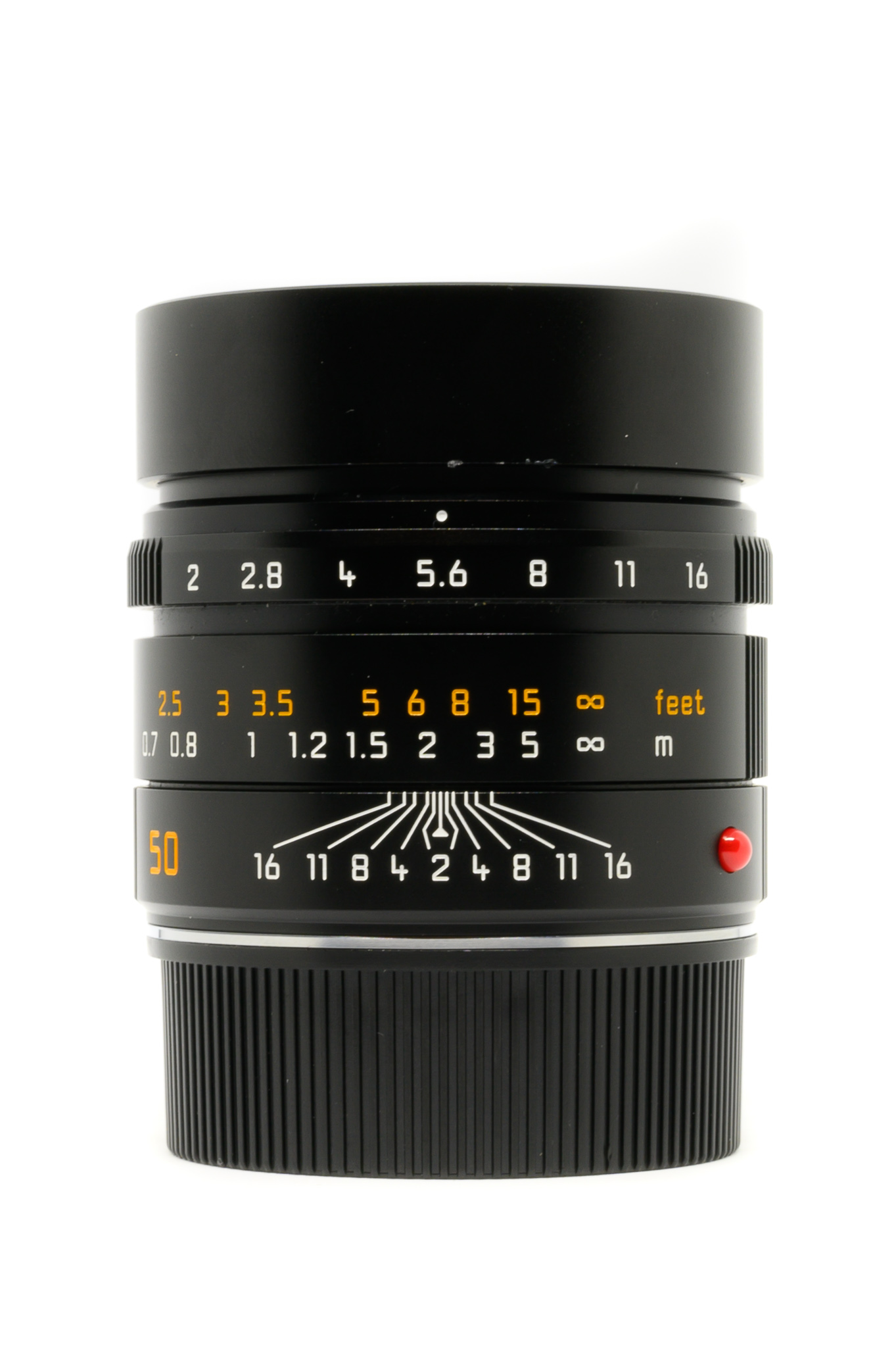
Leica APO Summicron-M 50 mm f/2.

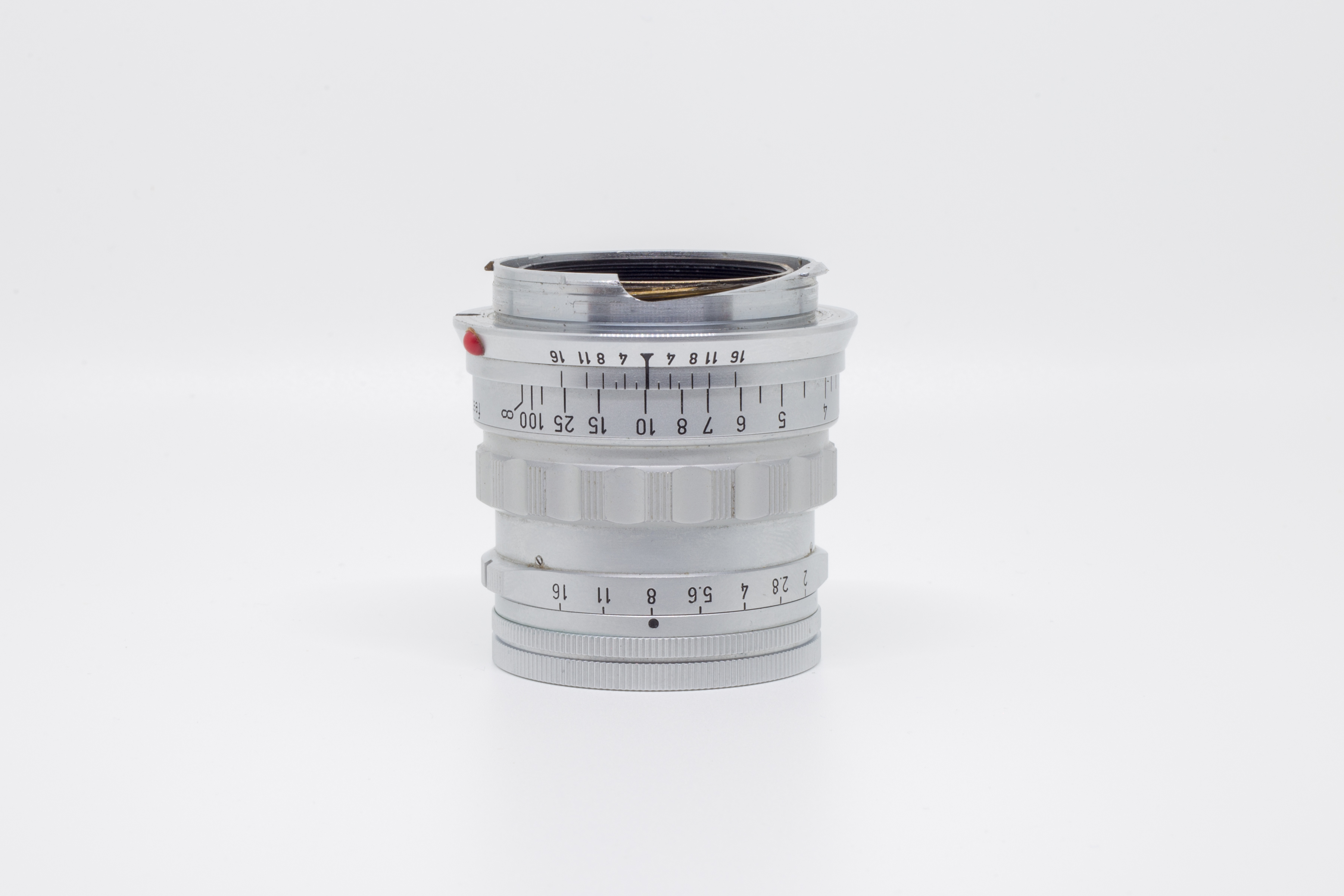
Leica Summicron-M 50 mm f/2 from 1960.

The name Summicron is used by Leica to designate camera lenses that have a maximum aperture of f/2 after 1953 and to present day.

== History ==
The name Summicron is derived from summus, Latin word for maximum and kronos, the ancient Greek word for time. In the 1950s Leica bought Crown glass from Chance Brothers, an English company and used it to make the lenses.

Leica designed a number of f/2 lenses before the Summicron, such as the Summar and Summitar. New coating technologies available after World War II allowed for the creation of the Summicron lens. The first Summicron was an evolved Summitar collapsible 50mm with Lanthanum glass, and was launched in 1953. Generations before approximately 1960 were produced in M39 mount ("screw mount"), then made available in M-mount (Latch-on A42), R-mount, and C-mount.

== Description ==
The Summicron lenses have a maximum f-number of f/2.

== Market position ==
Faster Leica lenses are offered with the trade names Noctilux (or Nocticron) and Summilux. Summarit, Elmarit, and Elmar lenses are slower.

== List of Summicron lenses ==
For the Leica Q system (Leica Q3 43)

- APO-Summicron 43 mm f/2 ASPH

For the M39 lens mount

- Summicron 50 mm f/2 collapsible (1953)
- Summicron 50 mm f/2 rigid (1999)

For the Leica M mount

- Summicron-M 28 mm f/2 ASPH.
- Summicron-M 35 mm f/2
- Summicron-M 35 mm f/2 ASPH.
- Apo-Summicron-M 35 mm f/2 ASPH.
- Summicron-C 40 mm f/2
- Summicron-M 50 mm f/2
- Apo-Summicron-M 50 mm f/2 ASPH.
- Apo-Summicron-M 75 mm f/2 ASPH.
- Apo-Summicron-M 90 mm f/2 ASPH.

For the Leica R mount

- Leica 35 mm f/2.0 Summicron-R 1st version – 1970
- Leica 35 mm f/2.0 Summicron-R 2nd version – 1976
- Leica 50 mm f/2.0 Summicron-R 1st version – 1964
- Leica 50 mm f/2.0 Summicron-R 2nd version – 1977 (built-in lens hood, 3-cam and R-cam only version)
- Leica 90 mm Summicron-R 1st version – 1969
- Leica 90 mm Summicron-R 2nd version –
- Leica 90 mm APO-Summicron-R ASPH – 2002
- Leica 180 mm f/2.0 APO-Summicron-R

For the Leica S mount

- Summicron-S 1:2/100 mm ASPH.

For the Leica L Mount

- APO-Summicron-SL 1:2 / 21 ASPH. (According to the Leica roadmap for 2020)
- APO-Summicron-SL 1:2 / 24 ASPH. (According to the Leica roadmap for 2020)
- APO-Summicron-SL 1:2 / 28 ASPH. (According to the Leica roadmap for 2020)
- APO-Summicron-SL 1:2 / 35 ASPH.
- APO-Summicron-SL 1:2 / 50 ASPH.
- APO-Summicron-SL 1:2 / 75 ASPH.
- APO-Summicron-SL 1:2 / 90 ASPH.
