= David Gindler =

American lawyer and philanthropist

David Gindler is an American lawyer and philanthropist.

== Education and career ==
In 1981, Gindler graduated from Pomona College, where he met his wife and worked at the radio station KSPC.

Gindler serves as the head of the Intellectual Property Litigation and Licensing Group at Milbank and was previously the managing partner of Irell & Manella.

== Philanthropic efforts ==
Gindler has donated—with his wife, Kiki Ramos Gindler—more than $2 million to the Los Angeles Master Chorale.
