= Hektor (lens) =

The Hektor is a photographic lens design manufactured by Leica Camera. The first "fast" lens available for the Leica I(A) was the Hektor 50mm f/2,5. Later, the design was adapted for use as a long portrait lens, available first in a 73mm f/1.9 and 135mm f/4,5 screw-mount version and later in a 125mm f/2,5 bayonet-mount version. It is reported that Max Berek, who designed the original lens line for Leitz, named the "Hektor" after his dog.

Lenses named Hektor have also been used by Leitz as projection lenses for their Prado line of slide projectors, e.g. the Hektor 2.5/85 or the Hektor 2.5/100.
