= Kiki Ramos Gindler =

American lawyer and philanthropist

Kiki Ramos Gindler is an American philanthropist. She serves as the president of the board of directors of the Center Theatre Group, and has donated—with her husband, lawyer David Gindler—more than $2 million to the Los Angeles Master Chorale. She is a 1983 graduate of Pomona College, where she met her husband and worked at the radio station KSPC.
