= Noctilux =

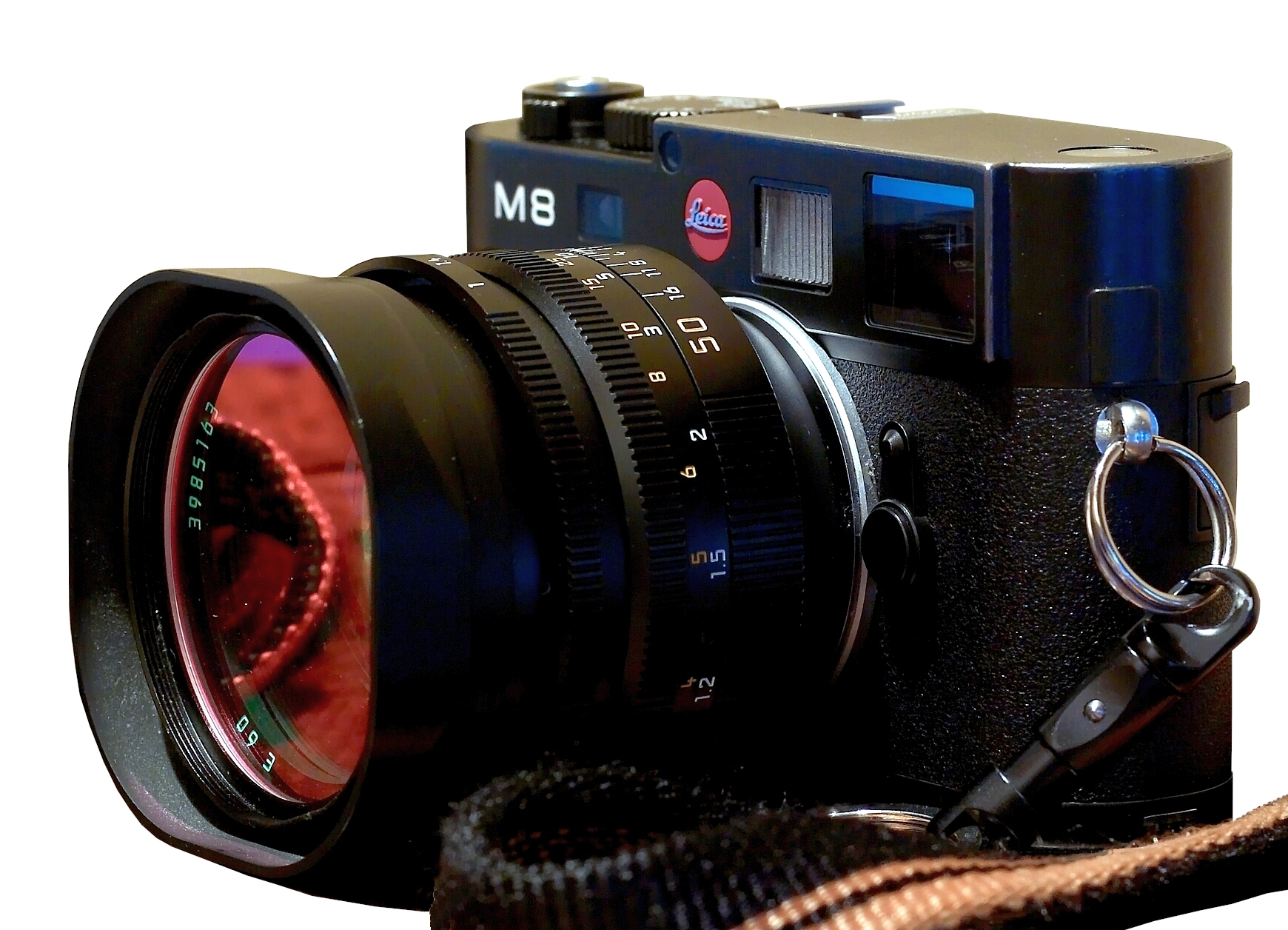
A Leica M8 with a Leica Noctilux-M 50mm f/1 lens.

Optical Diagram of Leica Noctilux 50mm f/0.95 ASPH lens.

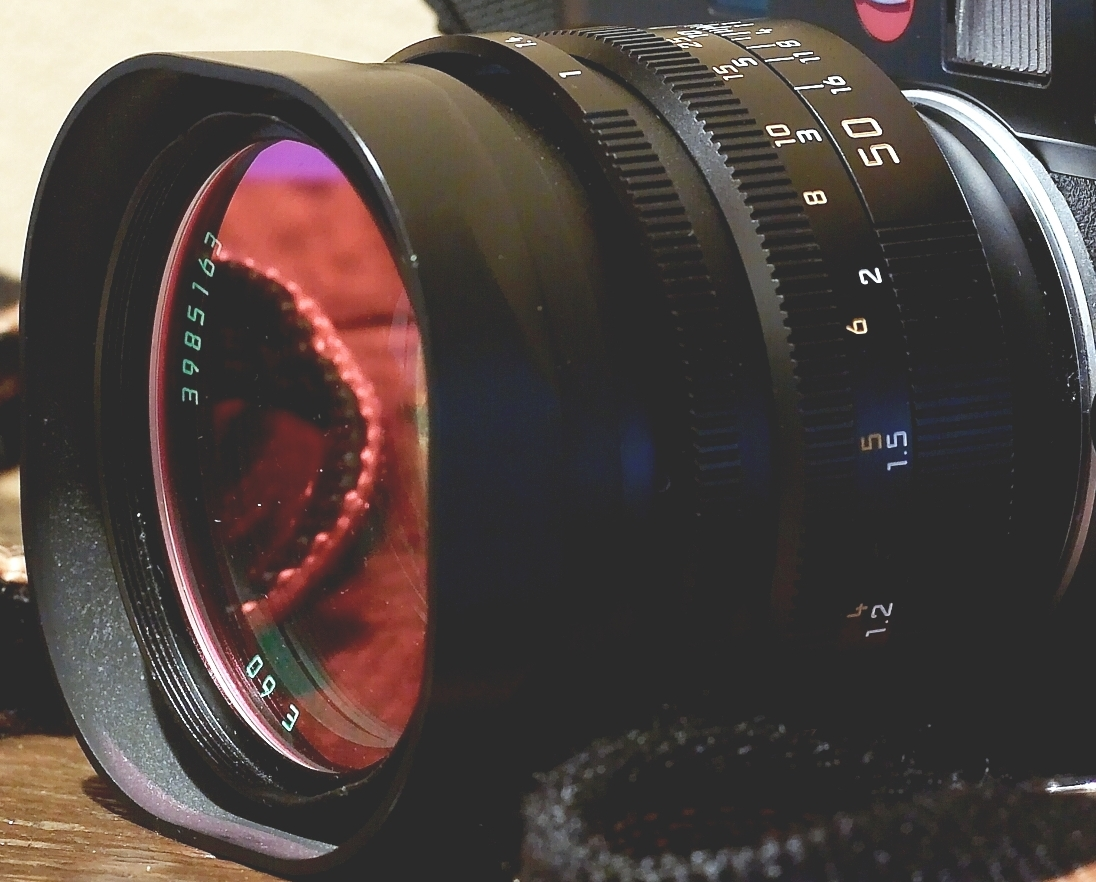
detailed view

The name Noctilux is used by Leica to designate their camera lenses with the widest maximum aperture. Lenses with that name have been in production since 1966. So far all Noctilux lenses have been made for the Leica M mount.

== History ==
The name Noctilux is a combination of Nocti, which is derived from the word nocturnal, while Lux is Latin for light.

Work on aspherical lens surfaces at Leica began as early as 1957, and a prototype Summaron 35mm f/2.8 ASPH featuring two aspherical surfaces was produced in 1958, though it never entered production. A 52mm f/1 ASPH prototype with two aspherical surfaces followed in 1959, but was abandoned because the image quality wide open was deemed insufficient. The first prototypes of what would become the Noctilux were produced in April 1964, designed by Helmut Marx and Paul Sindel. Marx was generally regarded as the successor to Professor Max Berek as head of photographic lens design at Leica in Wetzlar.

The original Noctilux 50mm f/1.2, released at Photokina in 1966, was the first serially produced lens in the world to employ aspherical elements — two hand-ground aspherical surfaces which required a specially built grinding machine operated by a single skilled craftsman, Gerd Bergmann. The production rate was extremely low, and only approximately 1,757 examples were ever manufactured before production ended in 1975, making surviving copies highly sought after by collectors.

In 1975, Dr. Walter Mandler, working at Leica's plant in Midland, Ontario, Canada, designed a replacement: an f/1 lens with seven elements in six groups that deliberately avoided aspherical surfaces in order to achieve consistent, manufacturable quality. This Noctilux-M 50mm f/1 was launched in 1976 and remained in production for over thirty years without significant alteration to its optical formula, becoming the definitive expression of the "Leica look" for a generation of photographers.

The current flagship, the Noctilux-M 50mm f/0.95 ASPH., was designed by Peter Karbe at Leica's Wetzlar facility and introduced at Photokina in Cologne in 2008. With eight elements in five groups — including aspherical elements and glass with anomalous partial dispersion — it became the world's fastest aspherical lens for 35mm photography at the time of its release. In 2017 the line was expanded with the Noctilux-M 75mm f/1.25 ASPH., a longer focal length intended primarily for portraiture. A reissue of the original 1966 design — the Noctilux-M 50mm f/1.2 ASPH. — was announced in January 2021, with its calculation and construction adhering closely to the original so that the imaging characteristics are nearly identical. Most recently, on 29 January 2026, Leica announced the Noctilux-M 35mm f/1.2 ASPH. — the first Noctilux lens to feature a 35mm focal length. Also designed by Peter Karbe, this lens has nine elements in six groups, including two aspherical elements and elements made from anomalous partial dispersion glass.

== Description ==
The Noctilux lenses have the largest maximum apertures in the Leica range. With various models having f-numbers of f/0.95 or f/1.0 or f/1.2 or f/1.25 as its maximum aperture. It is also the heaviest of all of Leica's M lenses.

=== Optical characteristics ===
A defining characteristic of the Noctilux family is the distinctive rendering produced by shooting at or near maximum aperture. The extreme shallowness of the depth of field at these apertures isolates the subject sharply from a background that dissolves into a smooth, cinematically blurred bokeh. This rendering — often described as dreamlike or surreal — is produced by a combination of field curvature, residual spherical aberration, and the specific design of the aperture diaphragm and rear element groups.

The f/0.95 model uses eight elements in five groups; five of the elements are made from glass with anomalous partial dispersion and three from high-refractive-index glass, together limiting colour fringing and chromatic aberration. Two large-diameter aspherical elements control spherical aberration for improved clarity and reduced distortion. A rear floating element maintains consistent image quality throughout the focusing range, even at the minimum focusing distance of one metre.

== List of Noctilux lenses ==
For the Leica M mount

Name	Focal length	Year	f-number	Filter size	Weight
Noctilux 50mm f/1.2	50mm	1966 – 1975	f/1.2	49mm	470 – 515 grams
Noctilux-M 50mm f/1	50mm	1976 – 2008	f/1.0	60mm	584 grams
Noctilux-M 50mm f/0.95 ASPH.	50mm	2008 – present	f/0.95	60mm	700 grams
Noctilux-M 75mm f/1.25 ASPH.	75mm	2017 – present	f/1.25	67mm	1055 grams
Noctilux-M 50mm f/1.2 ASPH.	50mm	2021 – present	f/1.2	49mm	405 grams
Noctilux-M 35mm 1:1,2 ASPH.	35mm	2026 – present	f/1.2	49mm	416 grams

== See also ==
- Leica Camera
- Leica M mount
- Summilux
- Summicron
- Walter Mandler
- Bokeh
- Aspherical lens
