= Elmar (lens) =

Leica camera lenses

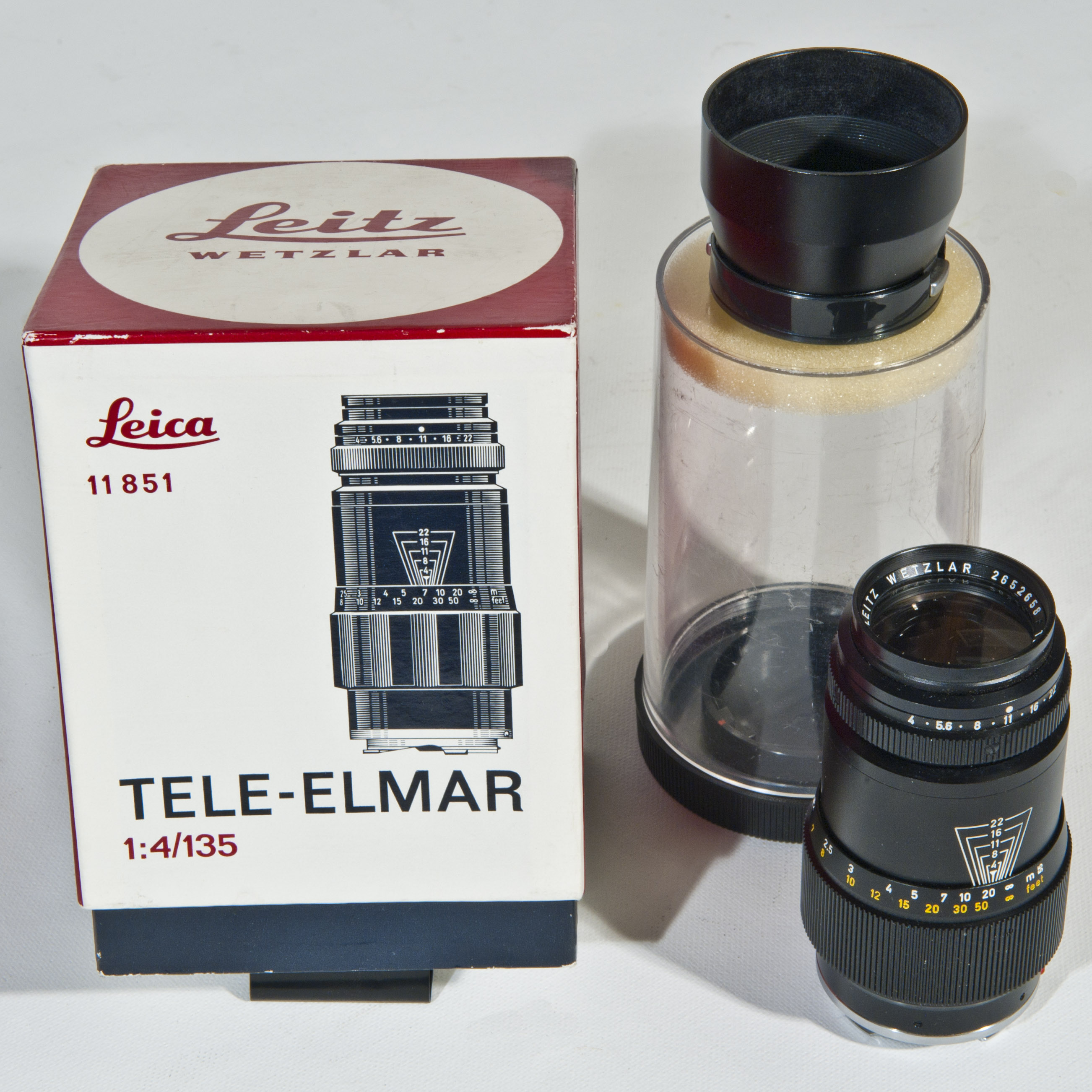
Leica Tele-Elmar 135 mm

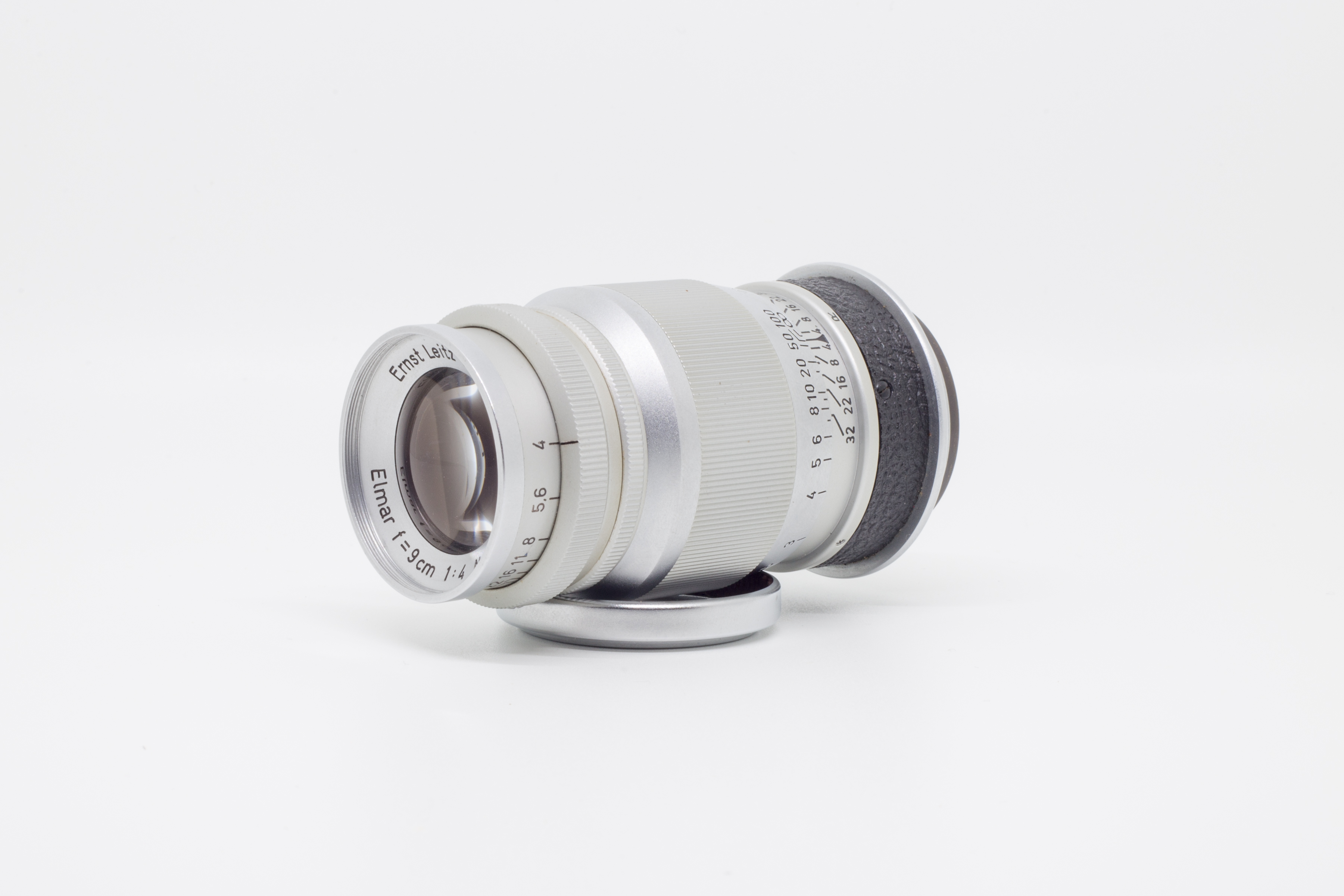
90 mm (9 cm) screw mount lens for Leica

The name Elmar is used by Leica to designate camera lenses of four elements.

== History ==
The Elmar lenses originally had a maximum aperture of f/3.5. These lenses were derived from a 50 mm f/3.5 Elmax lens first produced in 1925. The name is a combination of Ernst Leitz and Max Berek.

== Description ==
Elmar lenses have a maximum aperture ranging between f/2.8 and f/4. Current Elmar lenses have a maximum aperture of f/3.8 or f/4, as in the Elmar-M 24 mm f/3.8 and Tri-Elmar-M 16-18-21 mm f/4. The term Elmar is sometimes combined with: Super, Tele, APO, Macro or Vario. Leica also uses the name Elmarit for some lenses.

== Market positions ==
Elmar lenses are comparatively slow. As a result they tend to be smaller and lighter than faster lenses of the same focal length.

== List of Elmar lenses ==
For the M39 lens mount

- Elmar 35 mm f/3.5
- Elmar 50 mm f/3.5 collapsible
- Elmar 50 mm f/2.8 collapsible
- Elmar 90mm f/4

For the Leica M mount

- Tri-Elmar-M 16-18-21 mm f/4 ASPH.
- Tri-Elmar-M 28–35–50 mm f/4 ASPH.
- Super-Elmar-M 18 mm f/3.8 ASPH.
- Super-Elmar-M 21 mm f/3.4 ASPH.
- Elmar-M 50 mm f/2.8
- Elmar-M 50 mm f/3.5 (1954-1961)
- Macro-Elmar-M 90 mm f/4
- Elmar 135 mm f/4.0

For the Leica R mount

- Leica 15 mm f/3.5 Super-Elmar-R – 1980 (Carl Zeiss design)
- Leica 100 mm f/4.0 Macro-Elmar-R bellows version
- Leica 100 mm f/4.0 Macro-Elmar-R helical version
- Leica 180 mm f/4 Elmar-R – 1976
- Leica 21 mm–35 mm f/3.5–f/4.0 Vario-Elmar-R zoom – 2002
- Leica 28 mm–70 mm f/3.5–4.5 Vario-Elmar-R zoom
- Leica 35–70 f/4.0 Vario-Elmar-R zoom
- Leica 35–70 mm f/3.5 Vario-Elmar-R zoom (Minolta design and glass production)
- Leica 70–210 mm f/4.0 Vario-Elmar-R zoom (Minolta design and glass production)
- Leica 75–200 mm f/4.5 Vario-Elmar-R – 1976–1984 (Minolta design and glass production)
- Leica 80–200 mm f/4.5 Vario-Elmar-R zoom
- Leica 80–200 mm f/4.0 Vario-Elmar-R zoom
- Leica 105–280 mm f/4.2 Vario-Elmar-R zoom

For the Leica S mount

- Super-Elmar-S 1:3.5/24 mm ASPH.
- TS-APO-Elmar-S 1:5.6/120 mm ASPH. (Schneider-Kreuznach design)
- Apo-Elmar-S 1:3.5/180 mm ASPH.
- Apo-Elmar-S 1:3.5/180 mm ASPH. CS
- Vario-Elmar-S 1:3.5-5.6/30–90 mm ASPH.

For the Leica L Mount

- Super-Vario-Elmar-SL 1:3.5–4.5 / 16–35 ASPH.

== See also ==
- Tessar
