= Summilux =

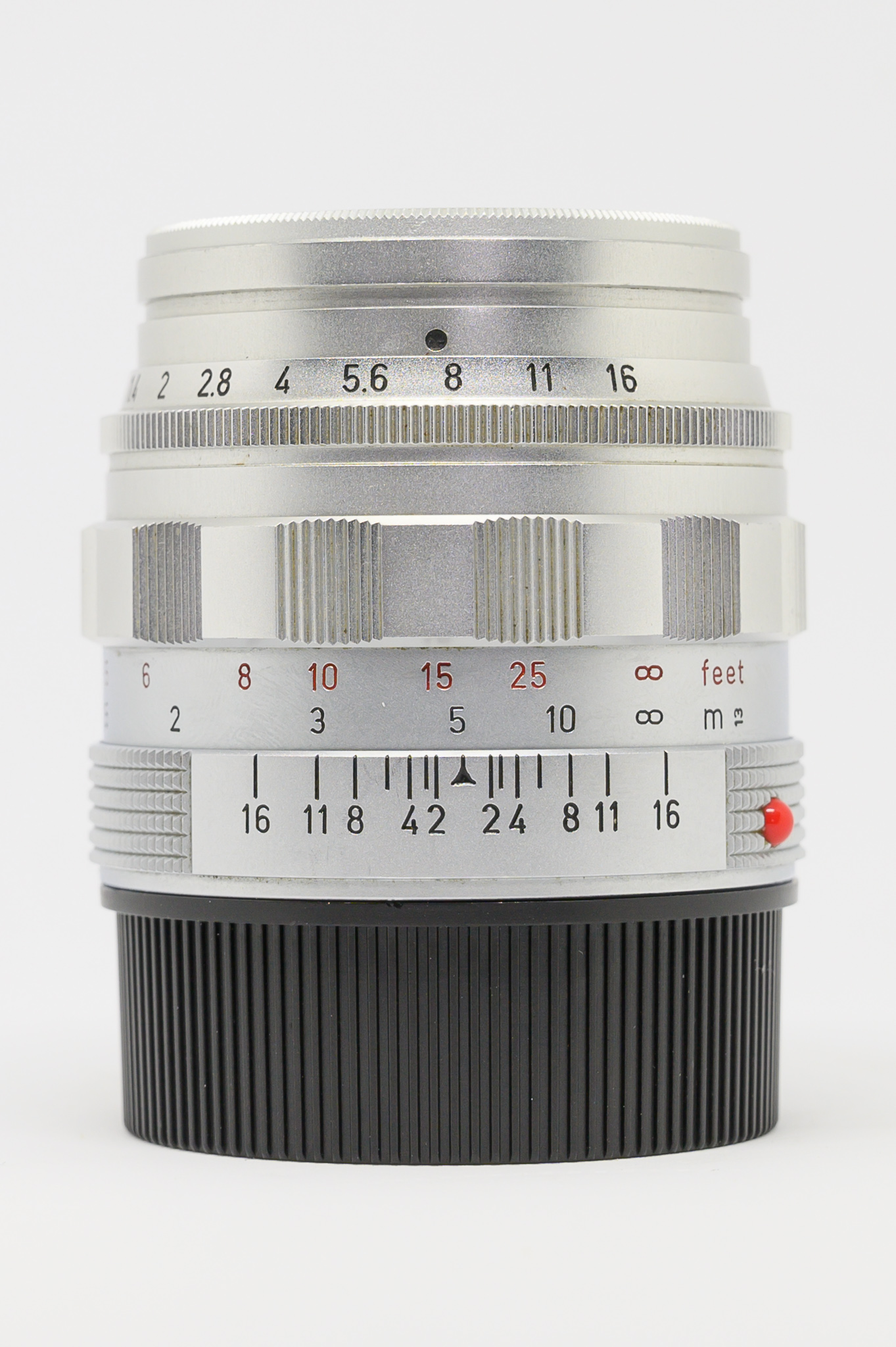
Leica Summilux-M 50 mm f/1.4 Version 2 (1961 – 1968)

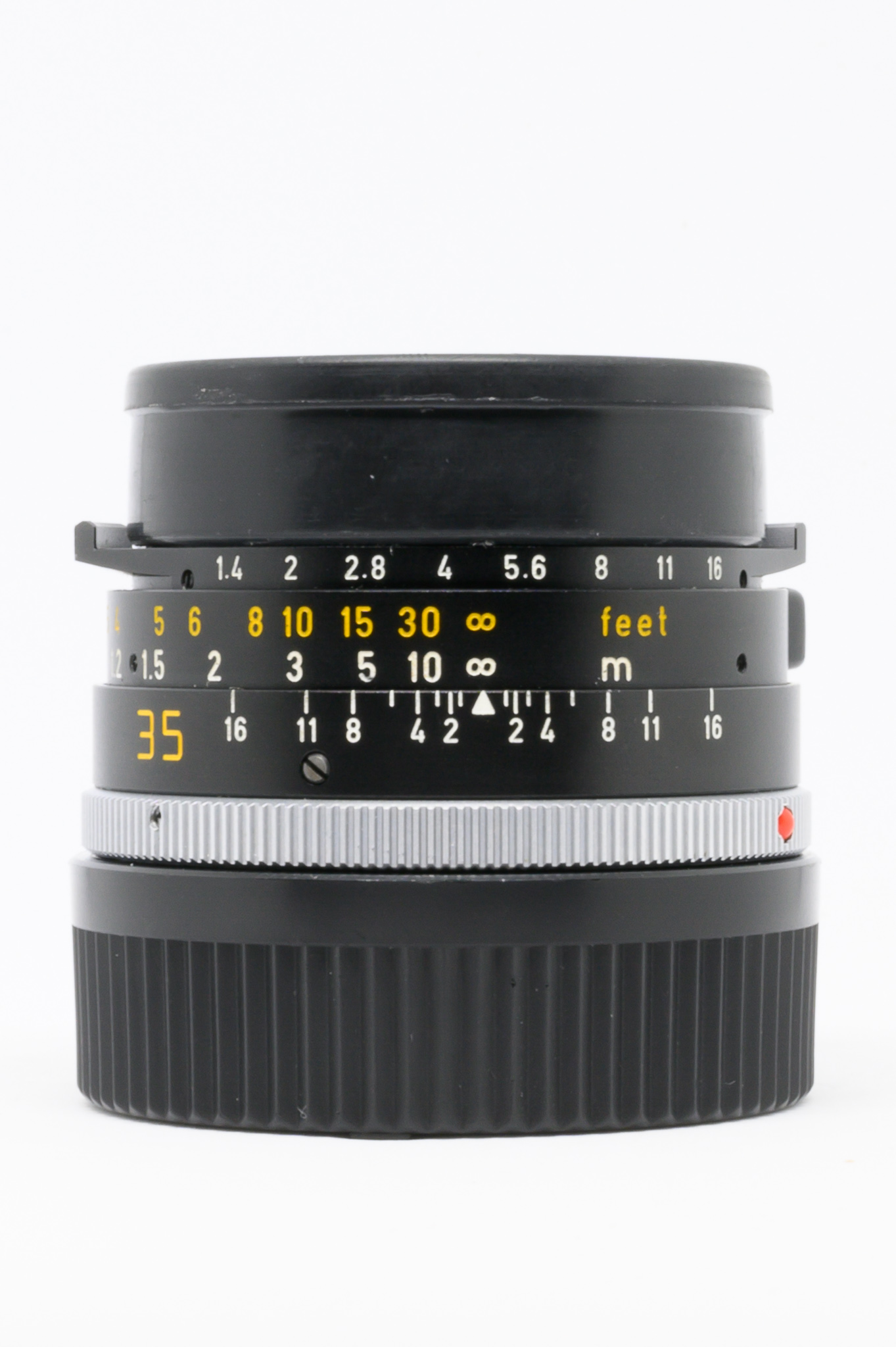
Leica Summilux 35 mm f/1.4 Version 1

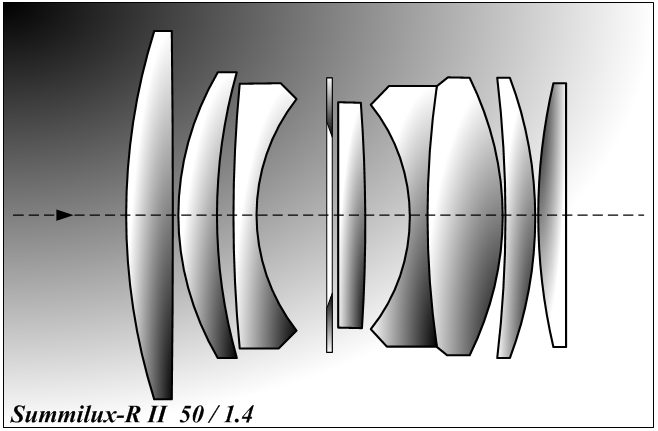
Optical Diagram of Leica Summilux-R 50mm f/1.4 II lens.

The name Summilux is used by Leica and Panasonic Lumix to designate camera lenses that have a maximum aperture brighter than f/2, typically at f/1.4, but dimmer than f/1.25. The lens has been in production since 1959 and carries on to the present day.

== History ==
The name Summilux is a combination of Summum, which is the Latin word for highest, while Lux is for light. The first Summilux was the 50 mm of 1959, followed by a new 50 mm Summilux design in 1961, whose optics remained unchanged until replaced by the 50 mm Summilux-M ASPH of 2004.

== Description ==
The Summilux lenses have a maximum f-number of f/1.4, f/1.5 or occasionally f/1.7. This means they are 1 to 1.5 f-stops slower than Leica's Noctilux lenses, but the Summilux lenses are smaller as a result. Summilux lenses are designed for low-light photography.

== Market position ==
The Summilux lenses are less expensive than the Noctilux lenses, which has a smaller f-number. However they are bigger, heavier and more expensive than the Summicron.

== List of Summilux lenses ==
For the Leica Q system (Leica Q, Leica Q2, Leica Q3)

- Summilux-M 28 mm f/1.7 ASPH.

For the Leica M mount

- Summilux-M 21 mm f/1.4 ASPH.
- Summilux-M 24 mm f/1.4 ASPH.
- Summilux-M 28 mm f/1.4 ASPH.
- Summilux 35 mm f/1.4
- Summilux-M 35 mm f/1.4 ASPH. FLE Version V
- Summilux-M 35 mm f/1.4 ASPH. FLE "Short Focus" Version VI
- Summilux 50 mm f/1.4
- Summilux-M 50 mm f/1.4 ASPH.
- Summilux-M 75 mm f/1.4
- Summilux-M 90 mm f/1.5 ASPH.

For the Leica R mount

- Summilux-R 35 mm f/1.4
- Summilux-R 50 mm f/1.4 1st version
- Summilux-R 50 mm f/1.4 2nd version
- Summilux-R 50 mm f/1.4 3rd version – 1997 (ROM contacts)
- Summilux-R 80mm f/1.4

For the Leica L Mount

- Summilux-TL 35 mm f/1.4 ASPH.
- Summilux-SL 50 mm f/1.4 ASPH.

For the Four Thirds mount (Note: manufactured under license by Panasonic)

For the Micro Four Thirds mount

- Panasonic Leica DG Vario-Summilux 10–25 mm f/1.7 ASPH.
- Panasonic Leica DG Summilux 12 mm f/1.4 ASPH.
- Panasonic Leica DG Summilux 15 mm f/1.7 ASPH.
- Panasonic Leica DG Summilux 25 mm f/1.4
- Panasonic Leica DG Summilux 25 mm f/1.4 II ASPH.
