= Walter Mandler =

German-Canadian lens designer (1922–2005)

Walter Mandler (10 May 1922 – 21 April 2005) was a lens designer of Ernst Leitz Canada (Leica Camera) in Midland, Ontario. Mandler is credited with the design of more than 45 Leica lenses for the Leica rangefinder cameras and Leica SLR cameras.

== Biography ==
Mandler was born into a German farmer's family. In 1947 he joined Ernst Leitz at Wetzlar as a lens designer, working with Max Berek. At the same time he studied in Giessen University. Later he obtained a bachelor's degree in Physics and then a Ph.D. (summa cum laude) in 1979.

In 1952 Ernst Leitz decided to establish Ernst Leitz Canada (ELCAN) at Midland, Ontario. Mandler was one of the team members "on loan" for a short period of time. However, Mandler stayed in Canada for more than half a century and became a Canadian citizen.

Mandler's chief contribution to the optical engineering was his pioneering works in application of computer aided design in optical engineering. Midland optical department was specialized in the research of retrofocus designs and apochromatic corrections. Mandler employed sophisticated combinations of special glasses in his apochromatic and high-speed designs, and many of these glasses were original Leitz formulas manufactured by Schott or Corning. Mandler was a master in optimizing Double-Gauss designs by means of the computer, and a particular method developed by him and explained in his doctoral dissertation.

Mandler became vice president of ELCAN from 1974, being an optical advisor for Leica until his retirement in 1985.

Mandler died on 21 April 2005 in Midland, Ontario.

== Mandler lenses ==
Mandler is credited with the design of more than 45 high performance Leica lenses for the Leica rangefinder cameras and Leica SLR cameras, including many landmark designs:

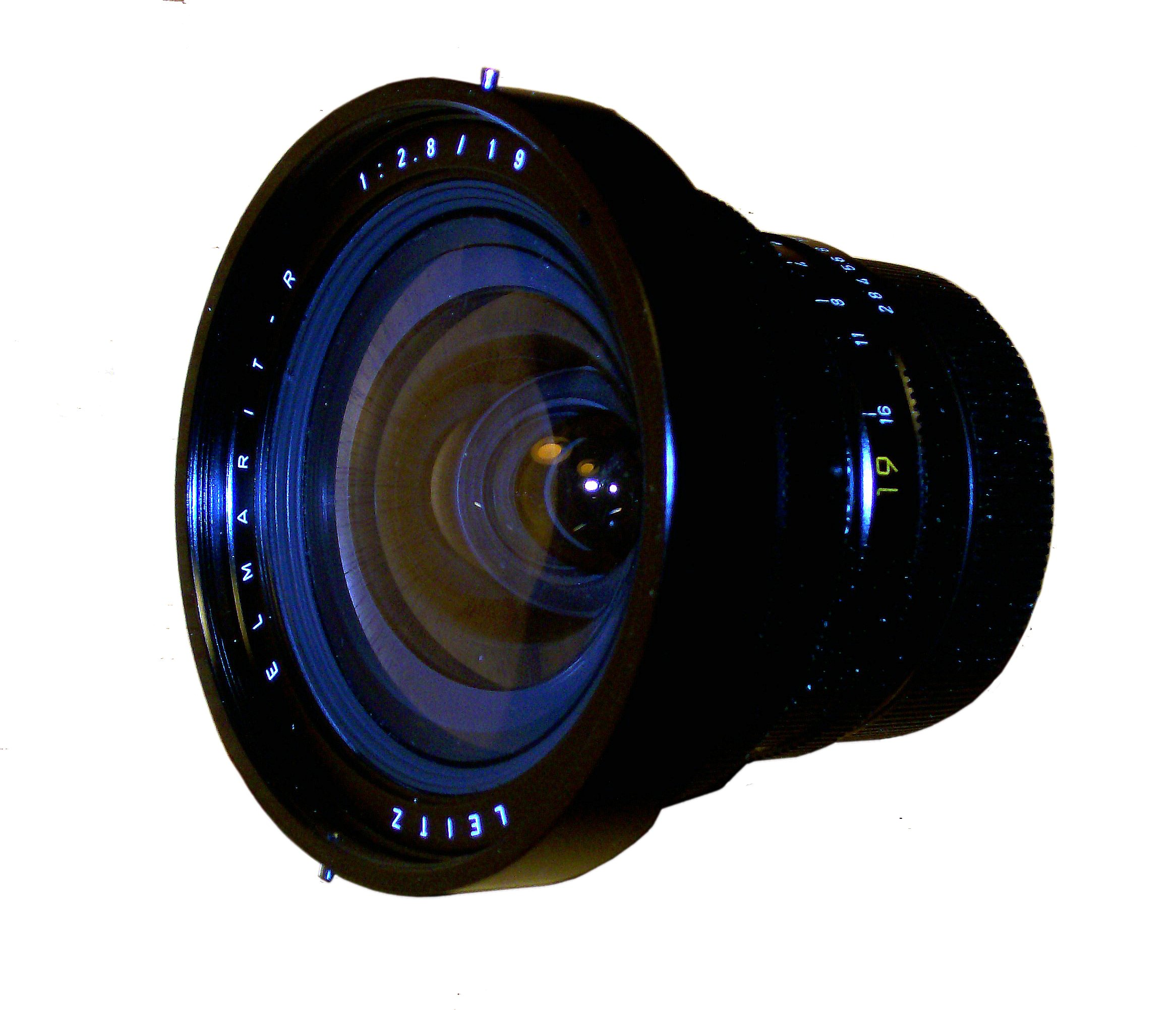
Ernst Leitz Canada Elmarit-R 19 mm/2.8

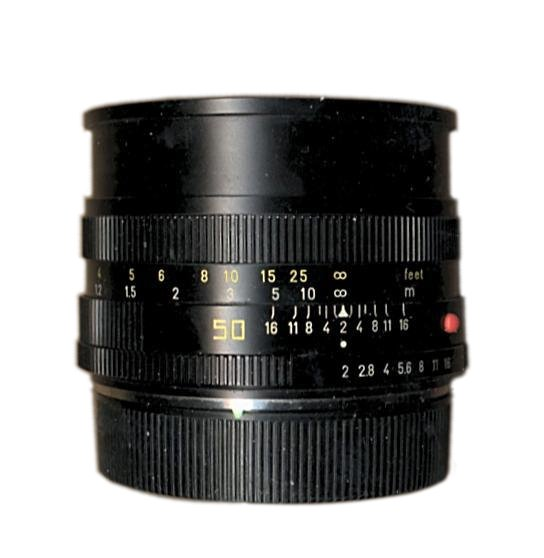
Leica Summicron 50 mm/2

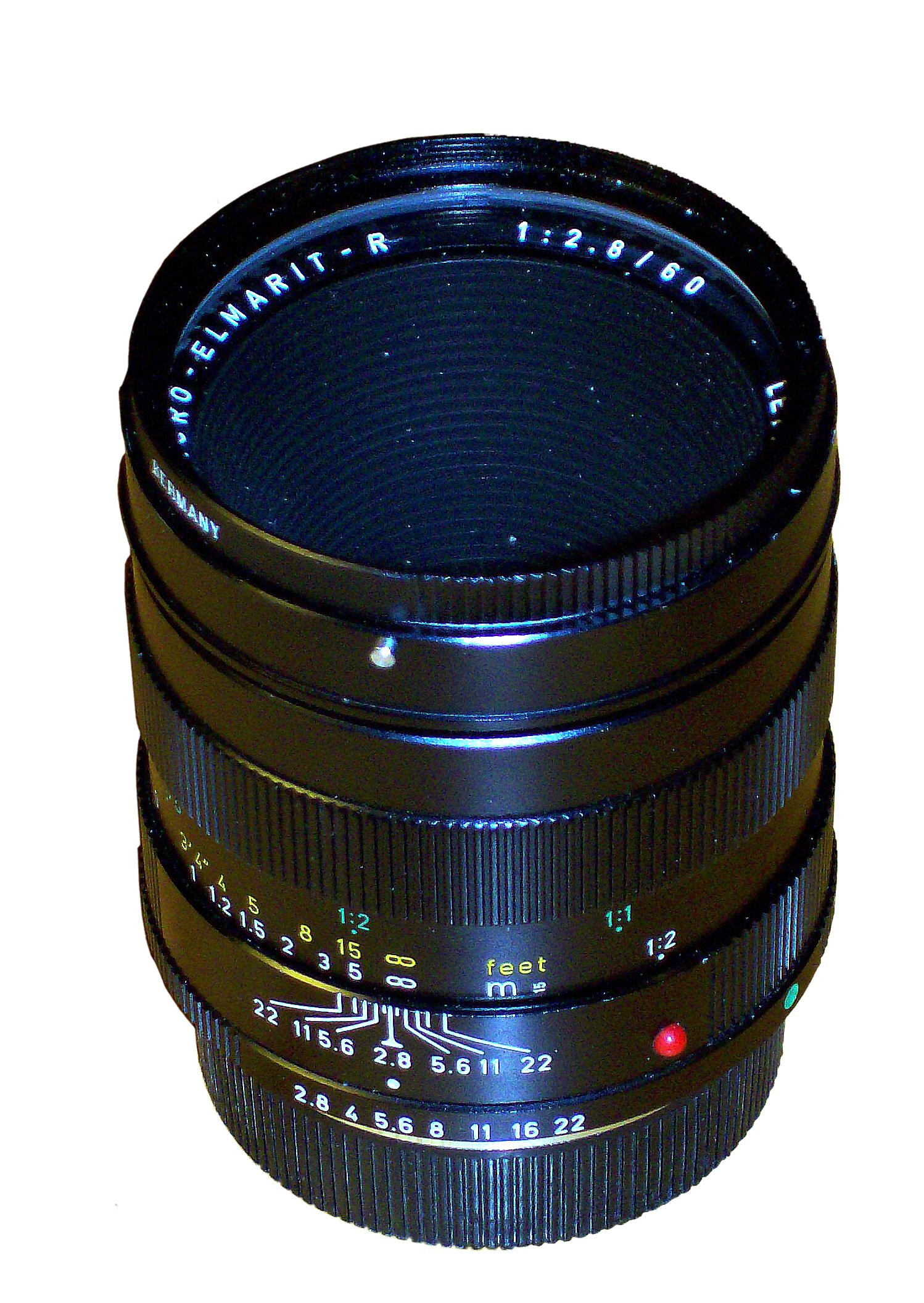
Leica Macro-Elmarit-R 60 mm/2.8

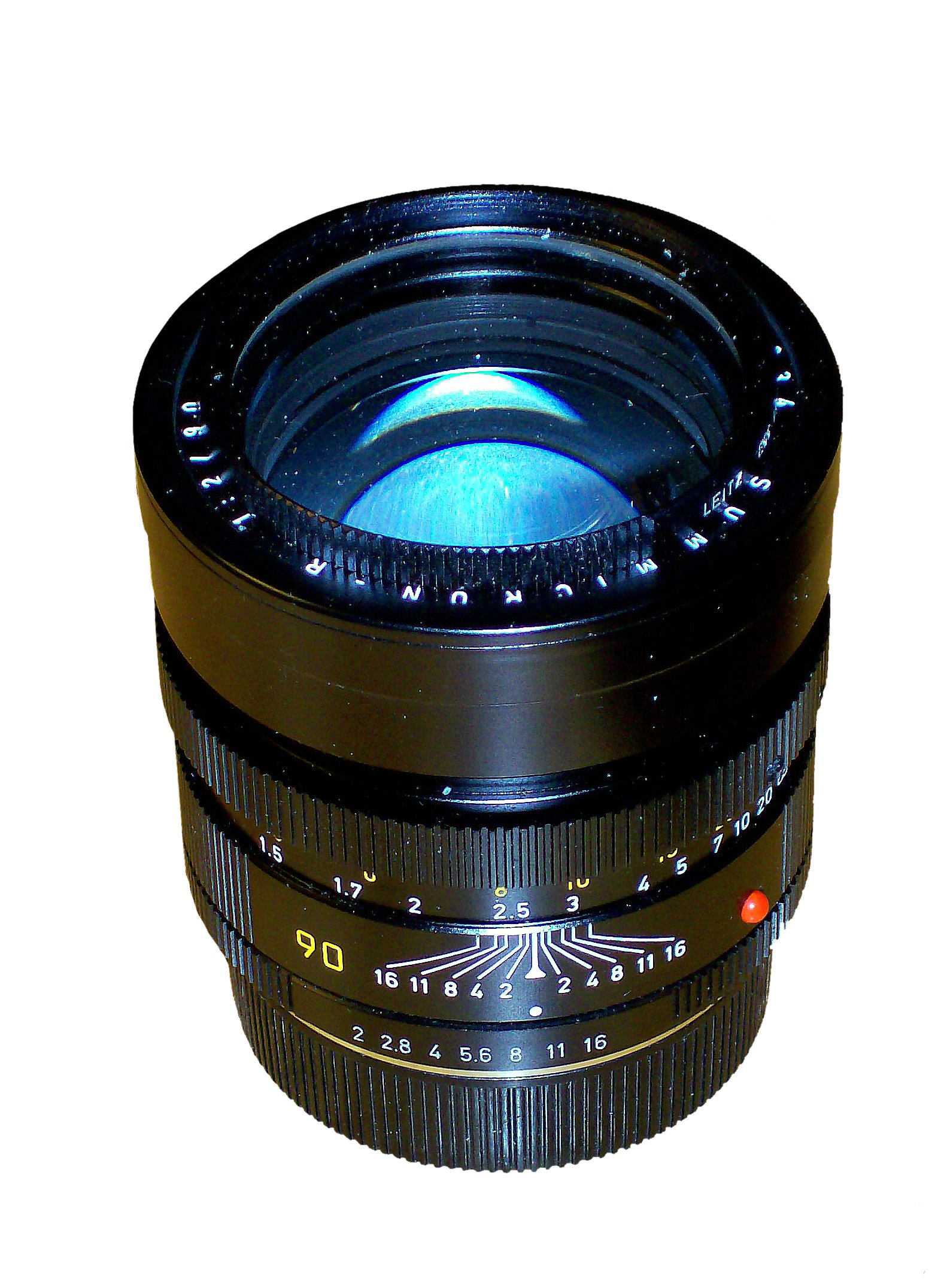
Leica Summicron-R 90 mm/2

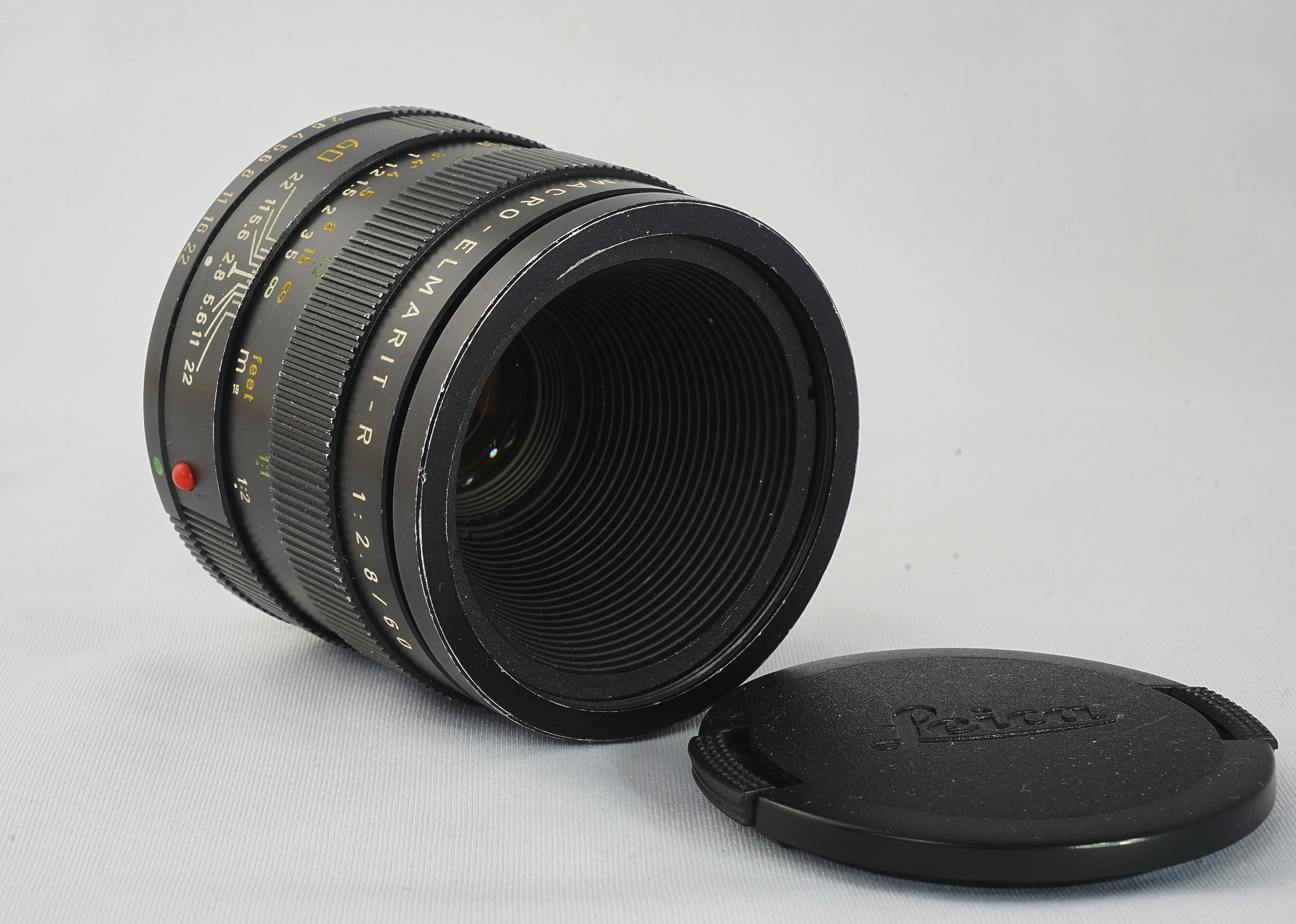
Leica Elmarit-R 90 mm/2.8

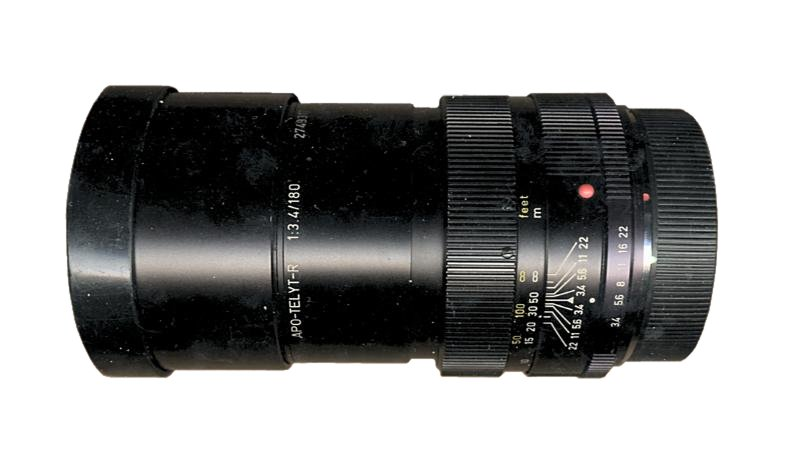
Apo-Telyt-R 180 mm/3.4

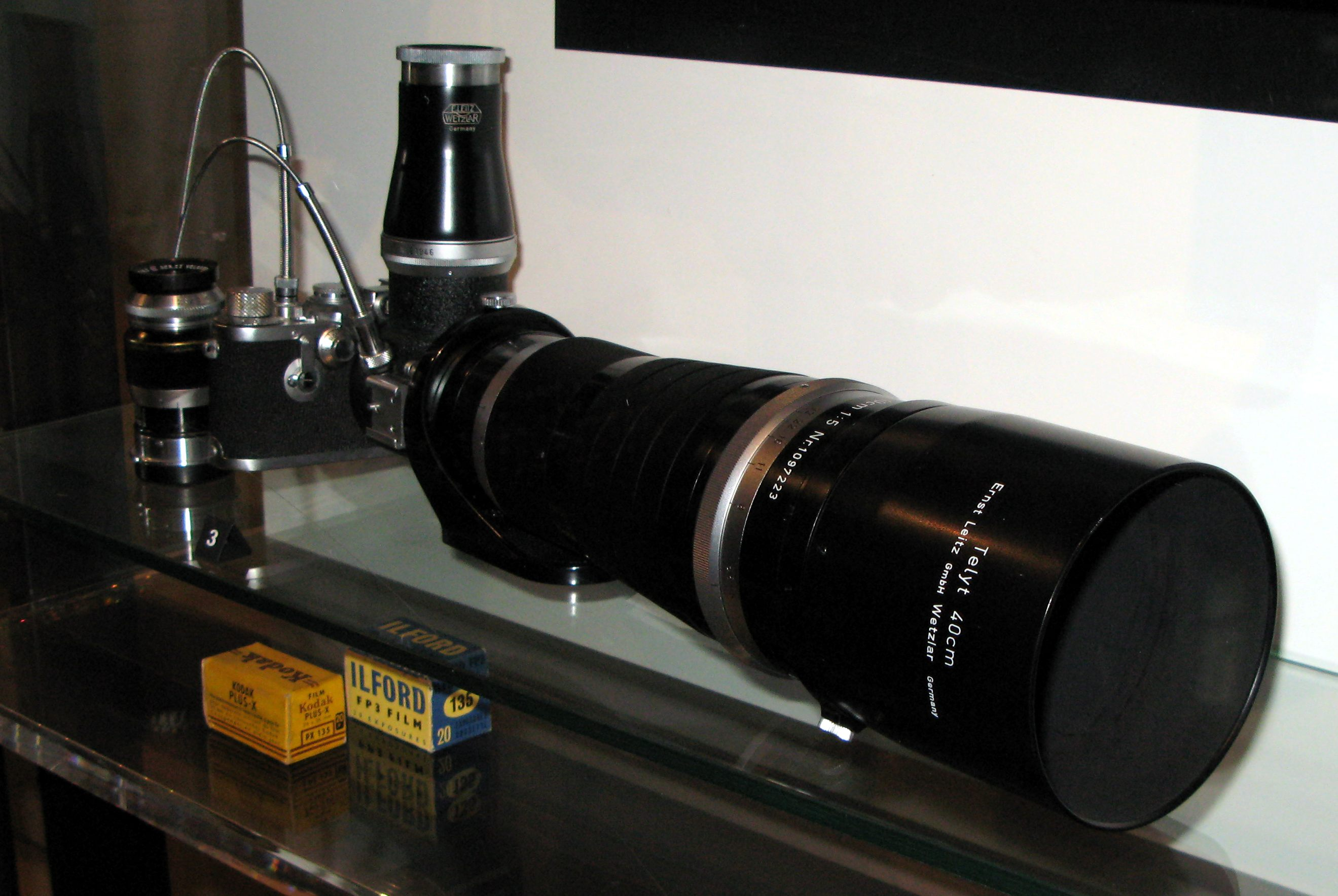
Leica Telyt 400 mm

A complete list of Leica M and R lenses designed by Mandler as selected by Mandler himself not in chronological order (Viewfinder, Volume 38, Number 2, 2005, page 12):

Screw-mount lenses

- 1) Summicron 35 mm/2
- 2) Summicron 90 mm/2
- 3) Elmar 135 mm/4
- 4) Telyt 200 mm/4
- 5) Telyt 280 mm/4.8
- 6) Telyt 400 mm/5 (2nd)

Leica M lenses

- 7) Elmarit 21 mm/2.8 (first retrofocus 21 mm design, in catalogue from 1980 to 1997. This lens replaced the Super-Angulon 21 mm/3.4 in production from 1963).
- 8) Elmarit-M 28 mm/2.8 (3rd) (excellent retrofocus lens for M rangefinder cameras, in production from 1979 until 1993)
- 9) Summaron 35 mm/2.8 (with and without goggles)
- 10) Summicron 35 mm/2 (1st, with and without goggles)
- 11) Summicron 35 mm/2 (2nd & 3rd)
- 12) Summicron 35 mm/2 (4th)
- 13) Summilux-M 35 mm/1.4 C27 (the first 35 mm focal length lens with a f/1.4 aperture, designed in 1958 and produced from 1961 until 1993. With and without M3 goggles)
- 14) Summicron 50 mm/2
- 15) Summicron 50 mm/2 (4th)
- 16) Summicron-M 50 mm/2.0 C368 (a landmark Double-Gauss design of 1974, still in production, since 1979)
- 17) Elcan 50 mm/2
- 18) Summilux-M 50 mm/1.4 (second version, in production for more than 40 years, from 1961 until 2004)
- 19) Noctilux-M 50 mm/1.0 C271 (the fastest lens for 35 mm format for many years, since 1975, designed in 1969, "before computer optimization was introduced at Leitz Canada" (Jonas & Thorpe, 2006)). This lens is now replaced by a faster, more complex, model: Noctilux-M 50 mm f/0.95 ASPH, from 2008)
- 20) Summilux-M 75 mm/1.4 (in production for 27 years, from 1980 until 2007. This was the favourite design of Mandler himself, based on the design of the second version Summilux-M 50mm)
- 21) Summilux 75 mm/1.4 (2nd) (only a mechanical revision; the same optical cell)
- 22) Elmar 90 mm/4 (3 elements)
- 23) Tele-Elmarit 90 mm/2.8 (1st)
- 24) Tele-Elmarit 90 mm/2.8 (2nd)
- 25) Elmarit 90 mm/2.8 (2nd) (different redesigns, from 1959, 1964, 1974 and 1990 for M cameras, to 1964 and 1980 for R cameras)
- 26) Summicron 90 mm/2 (1st and 2nd)
- 27) Summicron 90 mm/2.0 (3rd) (the last design was for M cameras, in production from 1980 until 1998; previous versions from 1963 and 1970 also for R cameras)
- 28) Elmar 135 mm/4
- 29) Tele-Elmar 135 mm/4
- 30) Elmarit 135 mm/2.8 (1st)
- 31) Elmarit 135 mm/2.8 (2nd)
- 32) Elcan 66 mm/2 (Extra-high resolution lens for the US Navy)
- 33) 90 mm/1.0 C164 (another special ELCAN lens for the US Navy)

Leica R lenses

- 34) Elmarit-R 19 mm/2.8 (1st)
- 35) Elmarit-R 19 mm/2.8 (2nd) (retrofocus design in production from 1975 until 1990)
- 36) Summicron-R 35 mm/2 (2nd)
- 37) Summicron-R 50 mm/2 (1st)
- 38) Summicron-R 50 mm/2 (2nd & 3rd)
- 39) Summilux-R 80 mm/1.4 (from 1980)
- 40) Elmarit-R 90 mm/2.8 (1st)
- 41) Elmarit-R 90 mm/2.8 (2nd)
- 42) Summicron-R 90 mm/2
- 43) Elmarit-R 135 mm/2.8 (1st)
- 44) Elmarit-R 135 mm/2.8 (2nd)
- 45) APO-Telyt-R 180 mm/3.4 (from 1975, this lens had extra low dispersion or anomalous dispersion elements, specially developed at the Leitz Wetzlar glass research lab, that equaled the performance of fluoride crystal elements without their drawbacks. (Only 6.000 units were produced.)
- 46) Telyt-R 250 mm/4 (1st)
- 47) Telyt-R 250 mm/4 (2nd)
- 48) Telyt 350 mm/4.8
- 49) APO 75 mm/2.0 C341 (an apochromatic R lens for a U.S. Navy high resolution small format camera system. Only two types of glass were employed in this 8 elements, Double-Gauss based design. Only a few units were produced in 1973.)

Mandler also designed lenses for IMAX movie projection systems, high-aperture lenses for Picker X-ray applications, lenses for RCA Victor television cameras, extrahigh resolution lenses for intelligence-gathering, scopes for the Canadian, US and NATO armed forces, lenses for HP scanners, etc.

== Mandler's significance ==
After his death, Ichiro Yoshiyama, former Chief Operating Officer of Minolta Corporation, declared "Dr. Walter Mandler was [...] always the subject of adoration among engineers of Minolta's optical engineering sections". Hiroshi Kimata, former editor of Popular Photography magazine, declared "Above all advanced cameras, the most respected and admired cameras and lenses in Japan are still the Leica cameras and Leica lenses. Without Leicas, no Japanese camera industry might be inspired to develop single-lens-reflex cameras and automatic machines. Leicas are still the unconquered highest summit of the world of photography".

Interviewed by Tom Abrahamsson in the early 80s about his favourite designs Mandler answered "Right now it is the 75 mm/1.4 Summilux because it's balance between performance and size". However, the current head of the optical department at Leica, Peter Karbe, stated that this is not his favorite lens, when interviewed during the photokina 2008 show. Mandler designed the Summilux-M 75 mm f/1.4 lens (1980) based on his previous design for the Summilux-M 50 mm f/1.4 lens (1961), but using new glass first applied to the Noctilux-M 50 mm f/1.0 lens (1969). In the same way, Karbe designed the APO-Summicron-M 75 mm f/2.0 ASPH lens (2005) based on his Summilux-M 50 mm f/1.4 ASPH lens (2004).

Peter Karbe wrote some lines about Mandler after his death: "I can readily say that Dr. Mandler was one of the great optical designers at Leitz and that his work constituted a major contribution to the success of the Leica M rangefinder camera. Dr. Mandler was clearly ahead of his times with his developments. That is proven by the numerous optical computations that still have lost nothing in terms of current relevance. Among them is the 50 mm f/1 Noctilux-M lens that he designed. Today, many publications still refer to his work, notably the landmark 50 mm f/2 Summicron-M lens. And there are numerous other examples that prove how important his work was for the evolution of photographic optics in general and for the evolution of photography at Leitz. This includes his apochromatically corrected telephoto lenses. [...] While I was writing these lines, it occurred to me that that I am not qualified to render a judgment of Dr. Mandler."

Erwin Puts wrote in an essay about Zeiss lenses that "The great revolution in optical designs occurred during the sixties and seventies, when Dr. Glatzel (Erhard Glatzel) of Zeiss introduced new methods of lens design. In the Leica-centric view of the world, one often assumes that well-known Leica designers, like Dr. Mandler, are in the front rank of the world's best optical designers. In fact this is not the case. Persons like Dr. Glatzel or Dr. Kingslake (Rudolf Kingslake) have had a more lasting impact on the evolution of lens design. It is only quite recently that Leica lens designs have broken out of the traditional constraints that have restrained the free flow of creativity of the design department."

Also in Puts' essay on Leica optical designers some clues about Mandler's significance can be found: "The key word for the Mandler designs is "state-of-the-art". The designs are first rate, even today, but the Japanese competition came quite close to producing the same level of imagery. The Leitz designs had their own typical set of compromises that distinguished their lenses from the rest, but the best of Zeiss, Canon and Nikon and Topcon were measurably on the same level [...] The Mandler era delivered first rate lenses, but they were mainstream lenses that fitted into the Zeitgeist of the 35 mm style of photography. The innovations (zoomlenses) however were snatched away from Leitz by the Japanese companies."

Erwin Puts concludes: "He was also a daring man: he created the Summilux 1.4/35 mm when everybody assumed that such a lens was not possible. Mandler was a pragmatist more than a visionary. His designs are very competent, but he had to work within the restrictions of the Leitz philosophy of lens manufacture. It seems that lenses for 35 mm photography were a bit boring for him, as they did not pose the challenge he wanted. This he found in the designs for the military and in the ELCAN lenses he could explore more exciting optical limits. [...] There are only a few letters by Mandler in the Leica archives and the contents give the impression of a passionate man, who feels slightly frustrated by the slow progress made by Leitz and the fast improvements made by the Japanese. He clearly saw that without fundamental changes Leica could not compete in the long run. But Leitz was in those days already living on borrowed money. His ELCAN designs were by nature less cost oriented and the knowledge gained here could be transferred to the photographic department. [...] Mandler's study about the Double-Gauss designs is still the definitive analysis of the limits and potential of this class of lenses. The book was published in 1979 and represented the state of the art in optical design at that time. His achievement was the transfer of that theoretical framework to practical design. He did not develop really innovative designs, but his strong point was the exploration of existing limits and to find ways to implement the almost impossible."

Reginald P. Jonas and Michael D. Thorpe, in the article quoted, also present a valuation of Mandler's significance. Mandler was Head of Optical and Mechanical design at Leitz Canada for 20 years "during which time he was involved in the design of over 400 lenses, including many photographic objectives, as well as lenses for movie taking, movie projection, laser scanning, and other speciality optics. In those days optical design was very much a group effort. Mandler's contribution as physicist and designer was to set out the general direction in which design solutions would proceed and to bring his experience and knowledge of optical design theory to select the shortest path to a solution. The solution chosen was not always the most excellent in the imaging sense but it would be the best solution, balancing performance, cost, and manufacturability. As a result many of these designs remained in production for decades". To sum up, "His name will always be synonymous with the best in photographic Double-Gauss lenses".
