= Leica M10 =

Digital camera

Overview
- Maker: Leica Camera
- Type: Digital rangefinder camera
- Intro price: $6,495 / £5,600

Lens
- Lens mount: Leica M-mount

Sensor/medium
- Sensor: 35.8 mm × 23.9 mm (1.41 in × 0.94 in) image sensor
- Sensor type: CMOS
- Maximum resolution: 24 Megapixels (RAW Color Depth:12bits)
- Film speed: 100 to 50000
- Storage media: SD, SDHC, SDXC

Focusing
- Focus modes: Manual

Exposure/metering
- Exposure modes: Manual, aperture priority auto exposure, shutter priority
- Exposure metering: Multi, centre weighted, spot

Flash
- Flash: Fixed hot shoe

Shutter
- Shutter: Focal plane, metal curtains, vertical travel
- Shutter speed range: 8 s to 1/4000 s

Viewfinder
- Viewfinder: Rangefinder and additional color TFT LCD display: 3", 1,036,800 pixels
- Viewfinder magnification: 0.73×

Image processing
- Image processor: Leica Maestro-II

General
- Video recording: No
- Battery: BP-SCL5 lithium-ion battery
- Dimensions: 139 mm × 80 mm × 39 mm (5.5 in × 3.1 in × 1.5 in)
- Weight: 660 g (23 oz) (incl. battery)
- Made in: Germany

Chronology
- Successor: Leica M11

The Leica M10 is a full-frame digital rangefinder camera in Leica Camera AG's rangefinder M series. It accepts Leica M-mount lenses. The camera model was introduced on 19 January 2017. It is a successor to the Leica M (Typ 240); and has similarities to and differences from the Leica M (Typ 240), Leica M (Typ 262), and Leica M Monochrom. There are five variants of the M10 line—the M10, M10-P, M10-D, and M10 Monochrom and M10-R.

== Differences to other recent Leica M series digital cameras ==
- New sensor (24 MP full-frame CMOS)
- Viewfinder has 30% enlargement, with the magnification increasing from 0.68x to 0.73x
- 50% increase of the viewfinder eye-relief for people who wear eyeglasses
- Body depth of 33.75 mm, 4 mm less than the Leica M Typ 240 – the same dimensions as Leica M film cameras
- Wireless LAN connectivity – the first Leica M camera with this feature
- Remotely controllable using a dedicated app (Apple iOS only at time of release)
- Manual ISO dial on the top plate, select-able between ISO 100 and 6400, auto ISO, and custom ISO
- ISO 100 to 50000 — a far greater range
- Improved dynamic range
- Continuous shooting at 5 frames-per-second
- Revised menu system
- Simplified rear button configuration
- A new, smaller, battery
- No video recording
- Increased dynamic range of up to 12.9 EV and improved low-light performance.

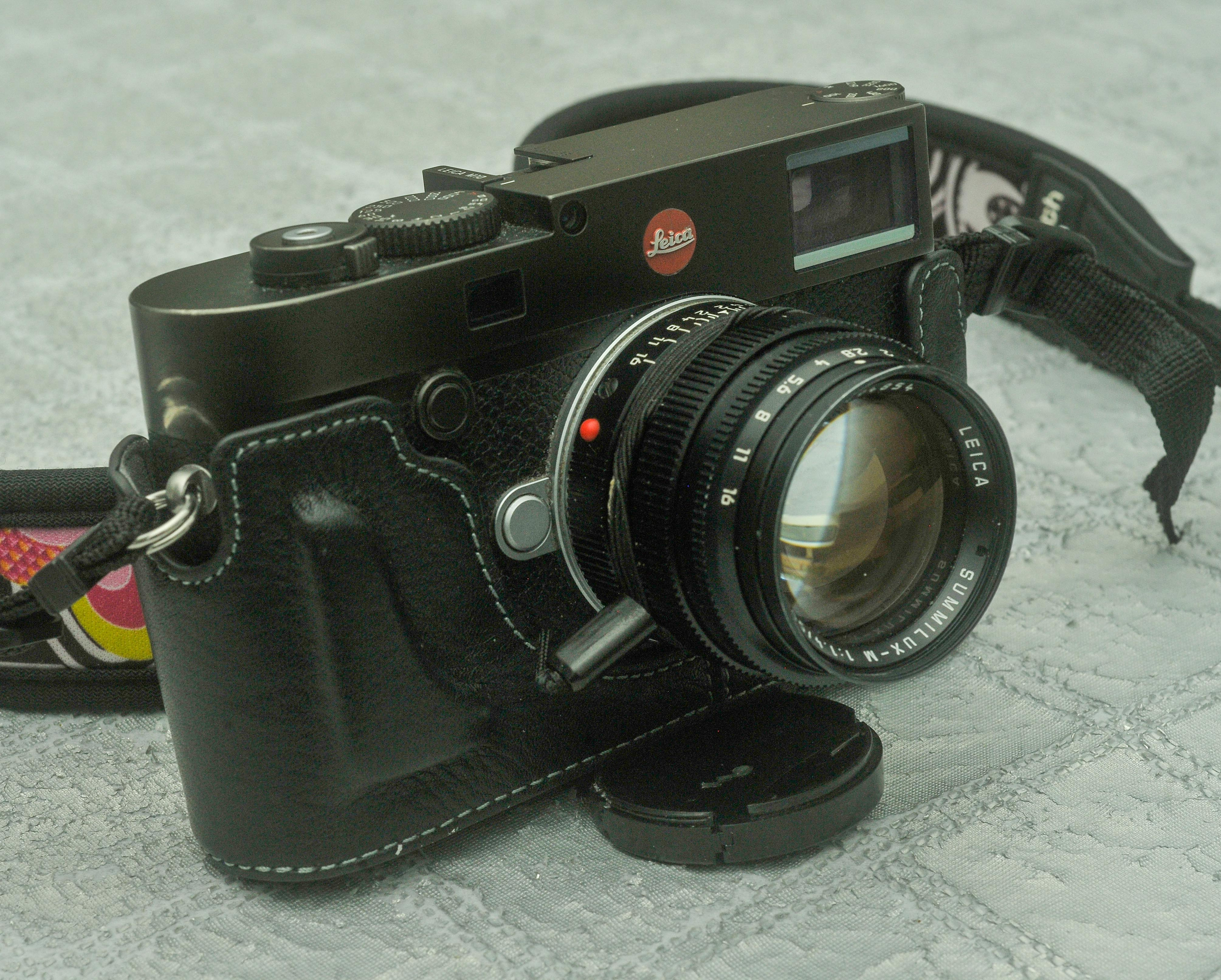
Black M10 with Summilux 50mm

== Leica M10-P ==
The Leica M10-P was announced on 21 August 2018. The design of the M10-P differs from that of the M10 by not having Leica's red dot on the front but instead it has Leica's script on its top plate. Apart from this the M10-P features a touchscreen LCD, an electronic level and a quieter shutter mechanism. The M10-P's retailed price is higher than the M10.

== Leica M10-D ==
The Leica M10-D, announced on 24 October 2018, is a unique variant designed to provide an analog-like experience by omitting the rear LCD screen. Instead of a display, the back of the camera features a mechanical dial for exposure compensation. It includes an integrated fold-out thumb rest, which aesthetically resembles a film advance lever from traditional M-series cameras. While it lacks a screen, the M10-D can be connected to the "Leica FOTOS" app via Wi-Fi for image review and settings adjustment.

== Leica M10 (P) Monochrom ==
The Leica M10 (P) Monochrom was introduced in January 2020 with a new 41 MP full-frame (24x36 mm) CMOS sensor. Also known as Typ 6376. Leica code number: 20 050. ISO: 160 to 100,000 (instead of 320 as a minimum limit on the preceding Monochrom Typ 246). Exposure: 16 min. to 1/4000th sec. Only exists in black.

The camera is called "Monochrom" as the sensor is not equipped with a Bayer-array filter which means: 1) it only records intensities of light in black and white (no color image can be obtained from it), 2) as a result of the absence of Bayer Red Green Blue filter it receives more light, is more sensitive with its highest ISO setting being 100,000, shows less noise at high ISOs, renders more (and precise) details (as there is no demosaicing, a digital process generally operated by the camera's processor from the partial information provided by a Bayer-type sensor that only "sees" Blue (or Red) with a quarter of its pixels, the rest has to be "invented" through the demosaicing process).

The Leica M10P Monochrom is the third iteration of such a camera equipped with a black-and-white only sensor, Leica being one of only a few brands manufacturing monochrome non-medium format cameras (Phase One produces the IQ4 Achromatic, Pentax produces the K-3 Mark III Monochrome - an APS-C sensor dSLR). The first generation started with the Leica M9, equipped with the Kodak 18 MP CCD sensor, in 2012. The next model, code name Typ 246, was derived from the Leica M240: it had a 24 MP CMOS full-frame sensor, and was released in 2015. The M10P Monochrom is the third generation of the black-and-white only concept. It shares most of its construction with the (color) M10P released in 2018:

- manual focus (with all bayonet Leica M-system lenses and other brand with this mount (called M-mount),
- same size (body) as M film cameras (since 1954), reduced from the bulky previous-generations of digital M cameras,
- touch-control LCD at the back (no touch control on the original M10 released in 2017),
- 2 GB buffer (double original 2017 M10)
- same Maestro 2 processor
- same additional Visoflex 020 (including GPS function)
- exposure compensation (+ or - 3 EV)

The main difference between the M10P and the M10P monochrom resides in their respective sensors: color (Bayer-array filter) 24 MP sensor for the M10P, black-and-white 41 MP sensor for the M10P Monochrom.

== Leica M10-R ==
Leica M10-R
Overview
- Maker: Leica Camera
- Type: Digital rangefinder camera
- Intro price: $8,295 / £7,100

Lens
- Lens mount: Leica M-mount

Sensor/medium
- Sensor: 35.8 mm × 23.9 mm (1.41 in × 0.94 in) image sensor
- Sensor type: CMOS
- Sensor maker: Leica
- Maximum resolution: 41 Megapixels (RAW Color Depth:14bits)
- Film speed: 100 to 50000
- Storage media: SD, SDHC, SDXC

Focusing
- Focus modes: Manual

Exposure/metering
- Exposure modes: Manual, aperture priority auto exposure, shutter priority
- Exposure metering: Multi, centre weighted, spot

Flash
- Flash: Fixed hot shoe

Shutter
- Shutter: Focal plane, metal curtains, vertical travel
- Shutter speed range: 960 s to 1/4000 s

Viewfinder
- Viewfinder: Rangefinder and additional color TFT LCD: 3", 1,036,800 pixels
- Viewfinder magnification: 0.73×

Image processing
- Image processor: Leica Maestro-II

General
- Video recording: No
- Battery: BP-SCL5 lithium-ion battery
- Dimensions: 139 mm × 80 mm × 39 mm (5.5 in × 3.1 in × 1.5 in)
- Weight: 660 g (23 oz) (incl. battery)
- Made in: Germany

Chronology
- Predecessor: Leica M (Typ 240)

The Leica M10-R announced on 16 July 2020 has 40 megapixels compared to the 24-megapixel sensor in the M10. Noise levels are also reduced.

The M10-R is the fifth variant of the M10 line and the company refers to it as the “pinnacle” of the lineup.

== Notable Leica accessories ==
- Leica Visoflex (typ 020) electronic viewfinder
- Thumb grip

== Gallery ==
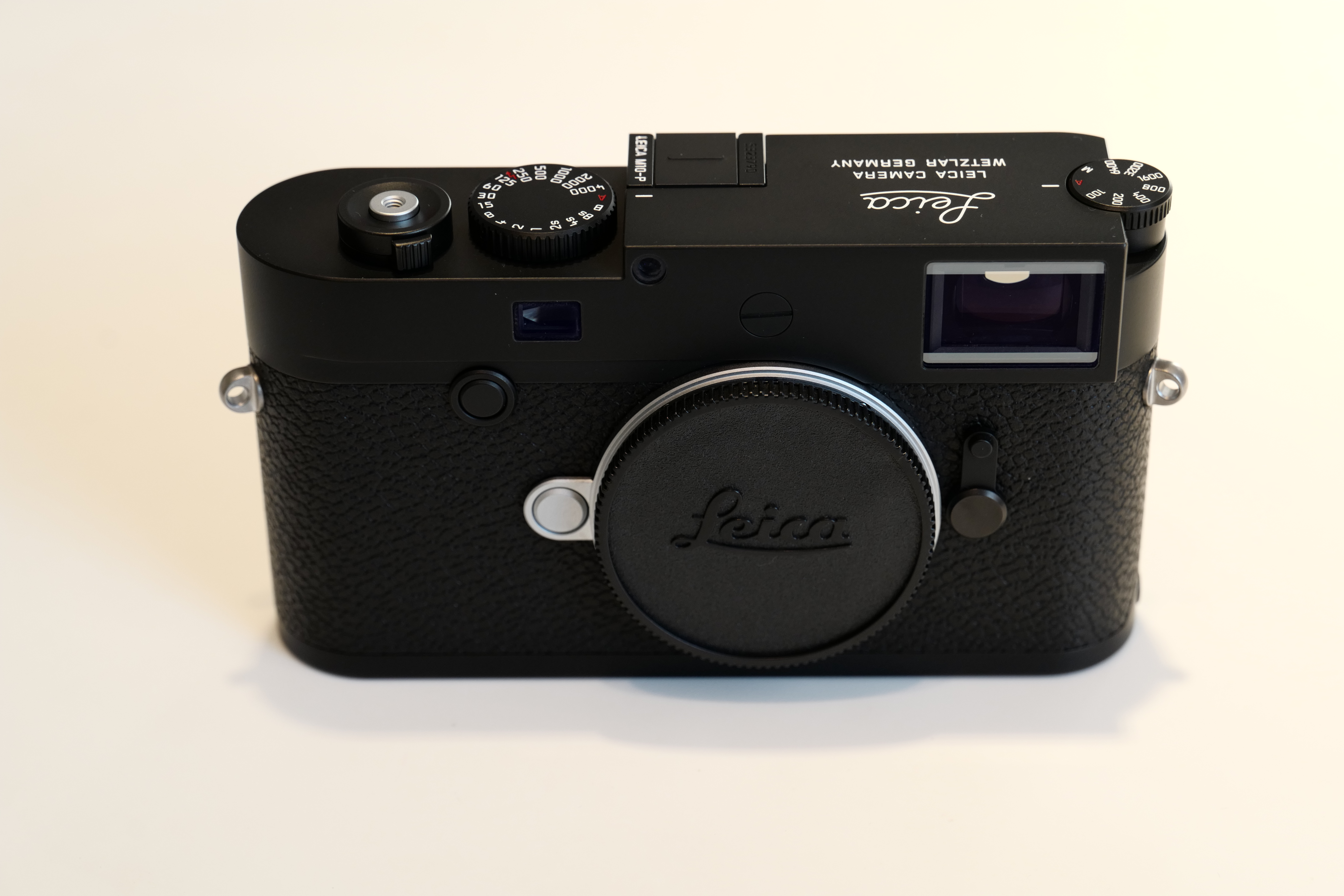
Leica M10-P

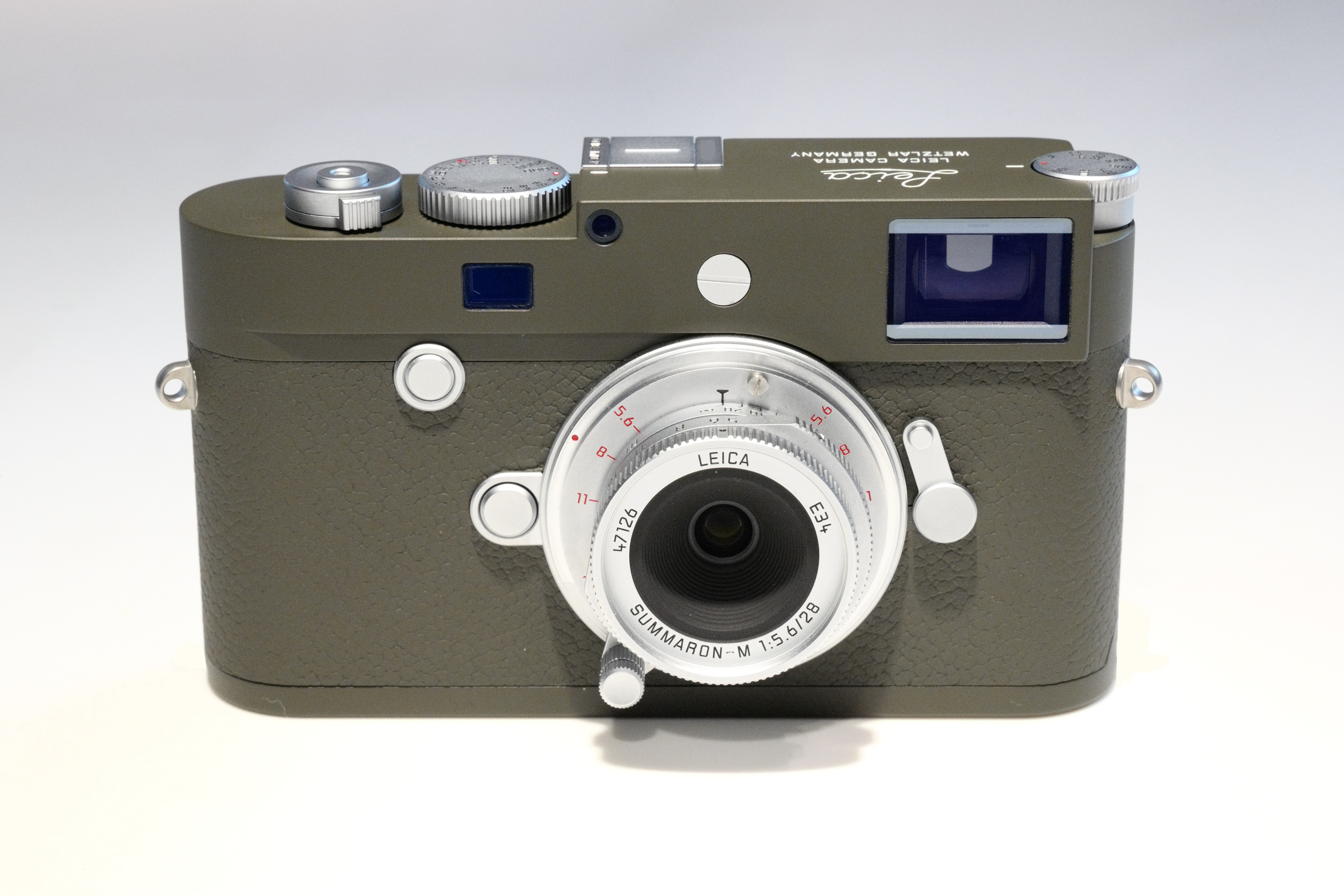
Leica M10-P 'Safari' edition

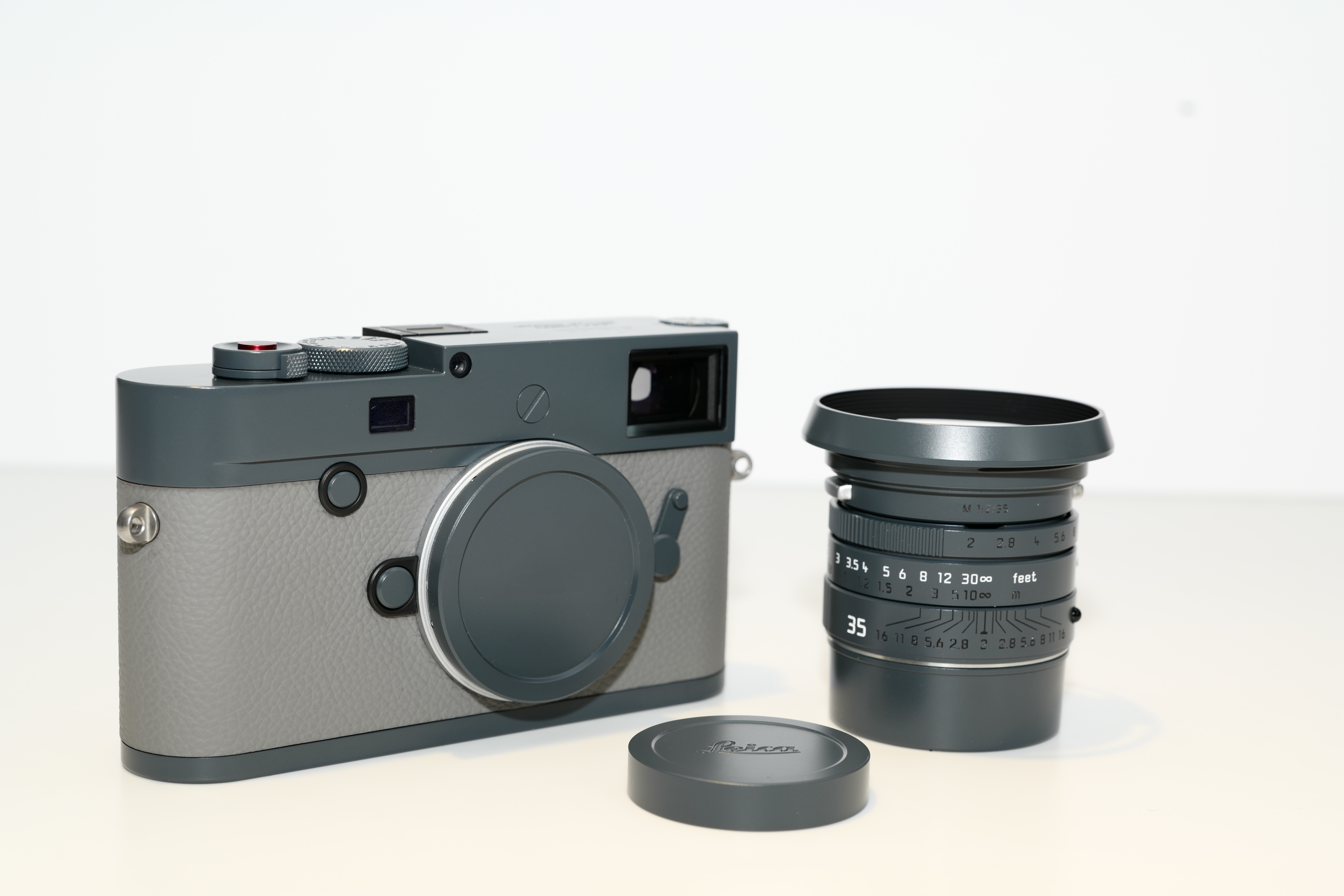
Leica M10-P 'Bold Grey' edition

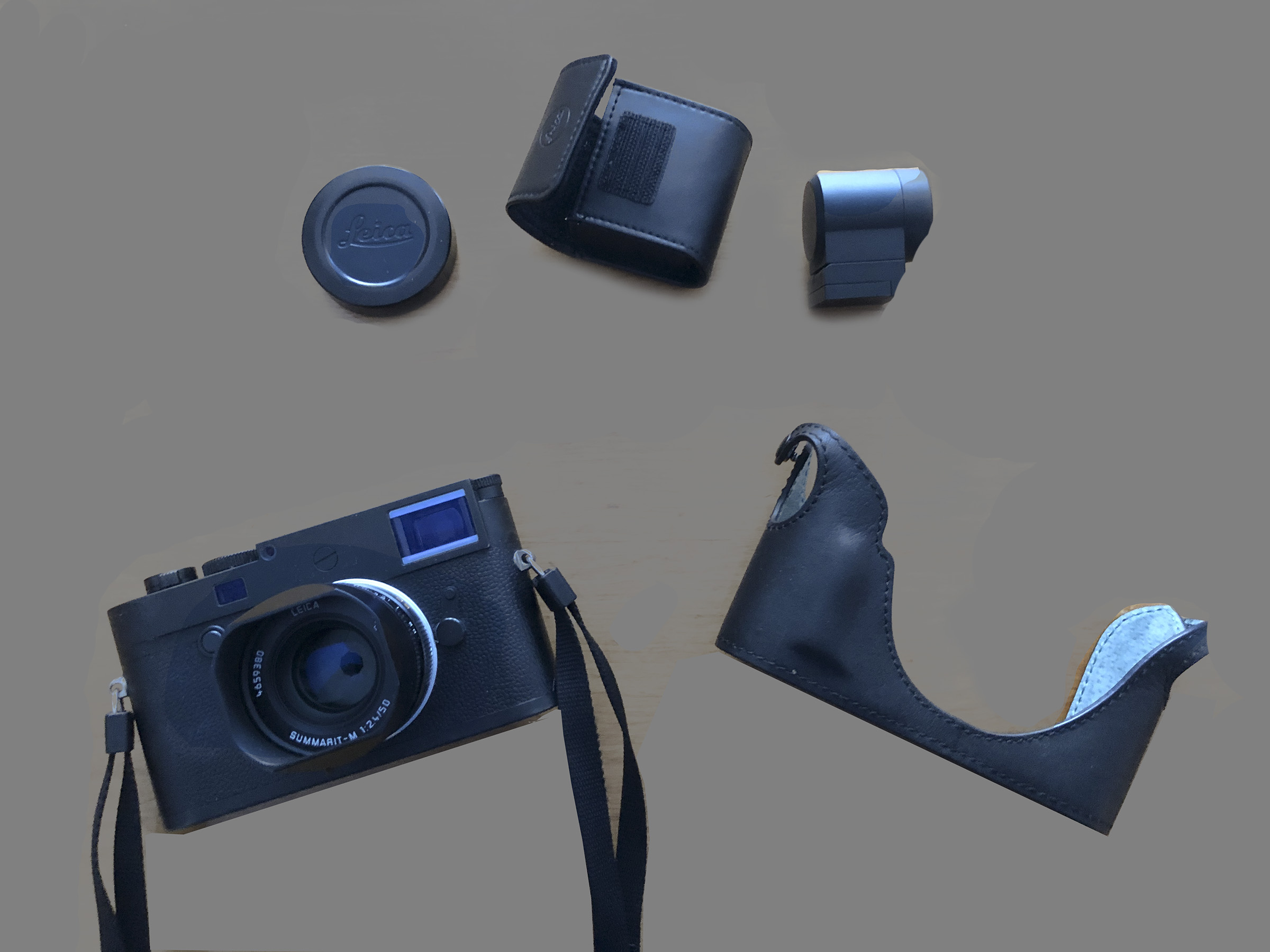

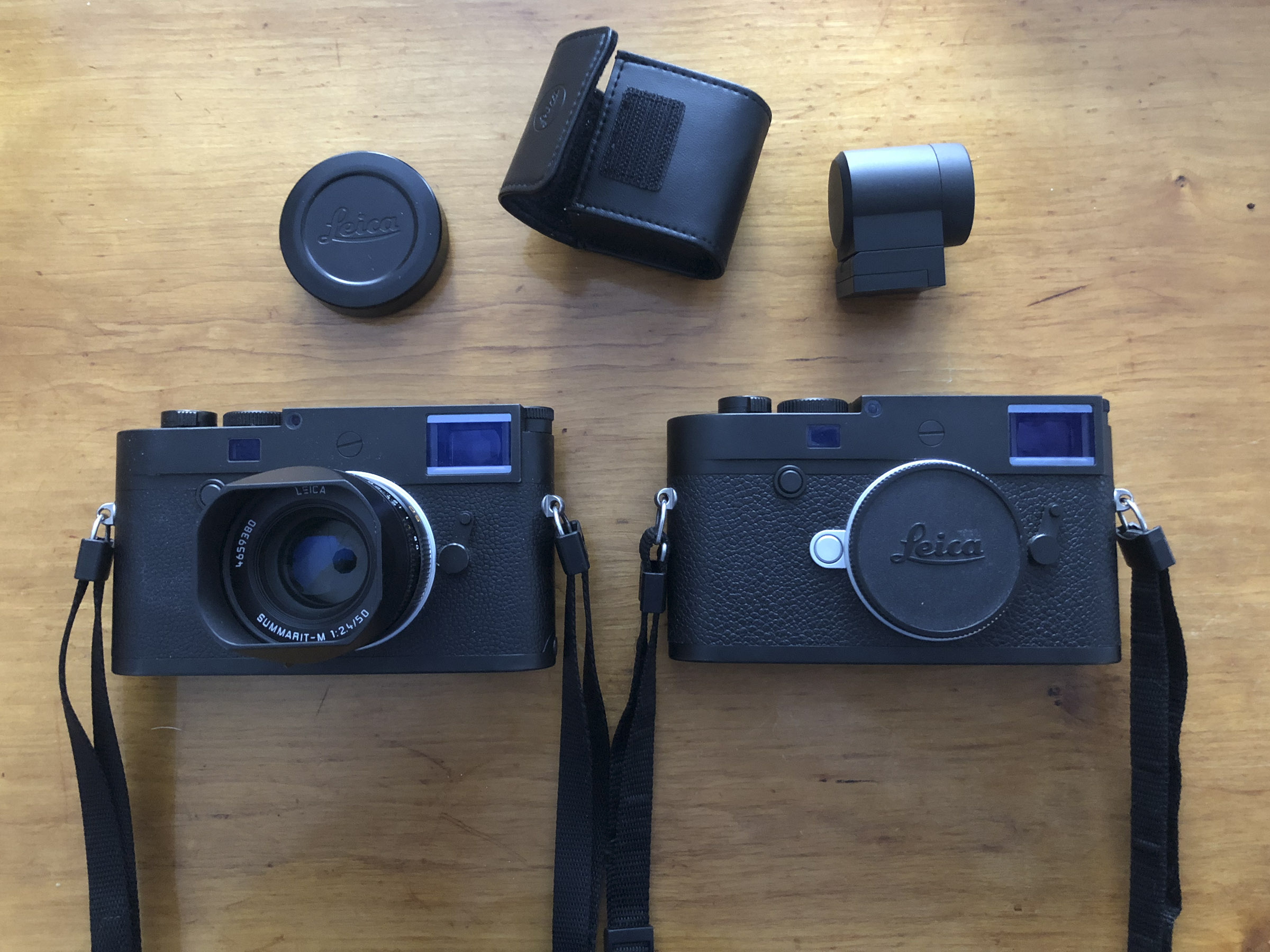

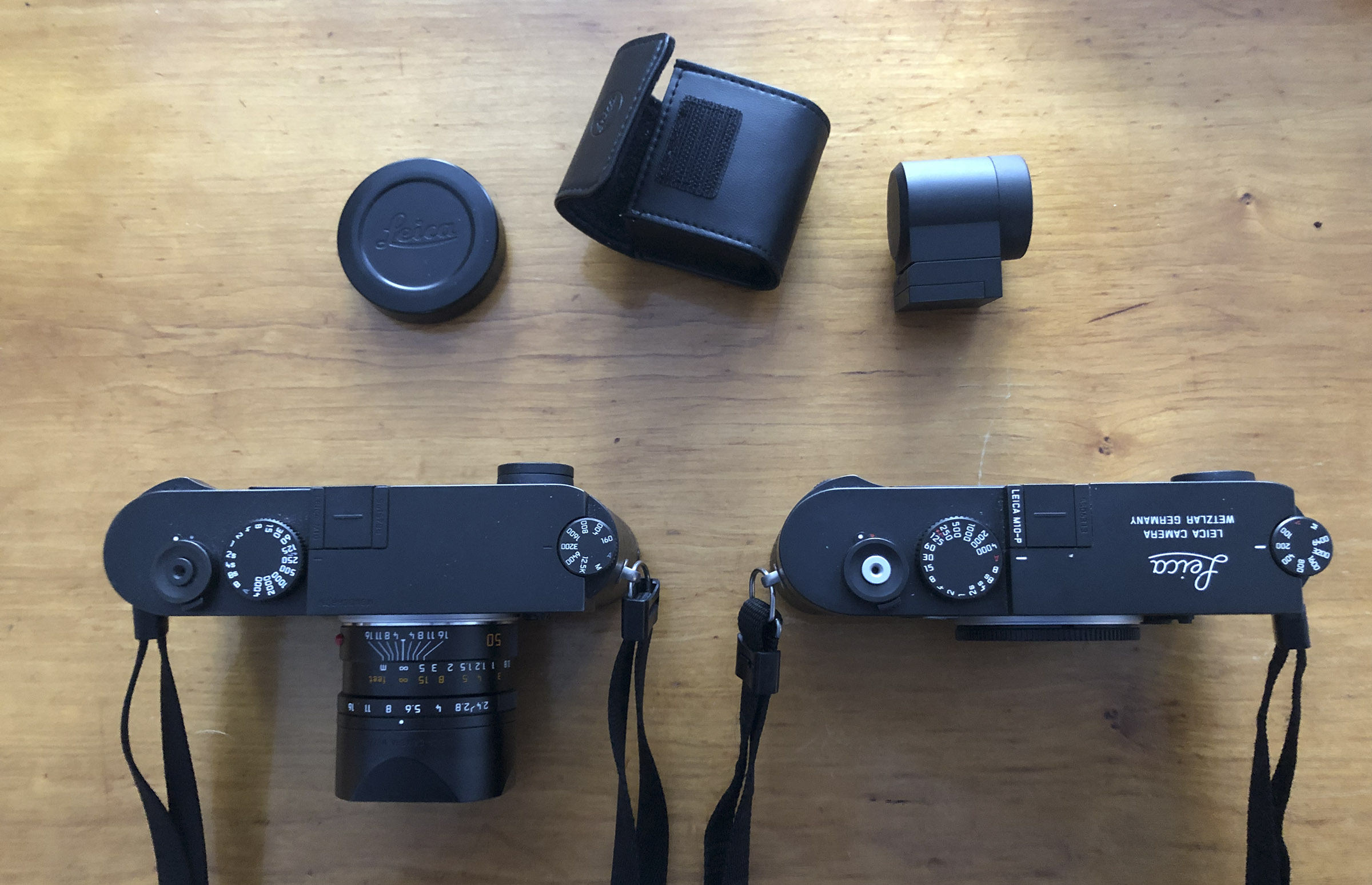

== See also ==
- List of retro-style digital cameras

Type		2006	2007	2008	2009	2010	2011	2012	2013	2014	2015	2016	2017	2018	2019	2020	2021	2022
Leica	M		M8			M9/ M9-P			M (240)/ M-P (240)				M10/ M10-P					M11
Leica	ME								M-E (220)			M (262)				M-E (240)		
Leica	MM								MM			MM (246)				M10M		
Leica	MD												M-D (262)		M10-D			
Leica	MR																M10-R	
Non-Leica		Epson R-D1; Zenit M																
