= Leica M10 Monochrom =

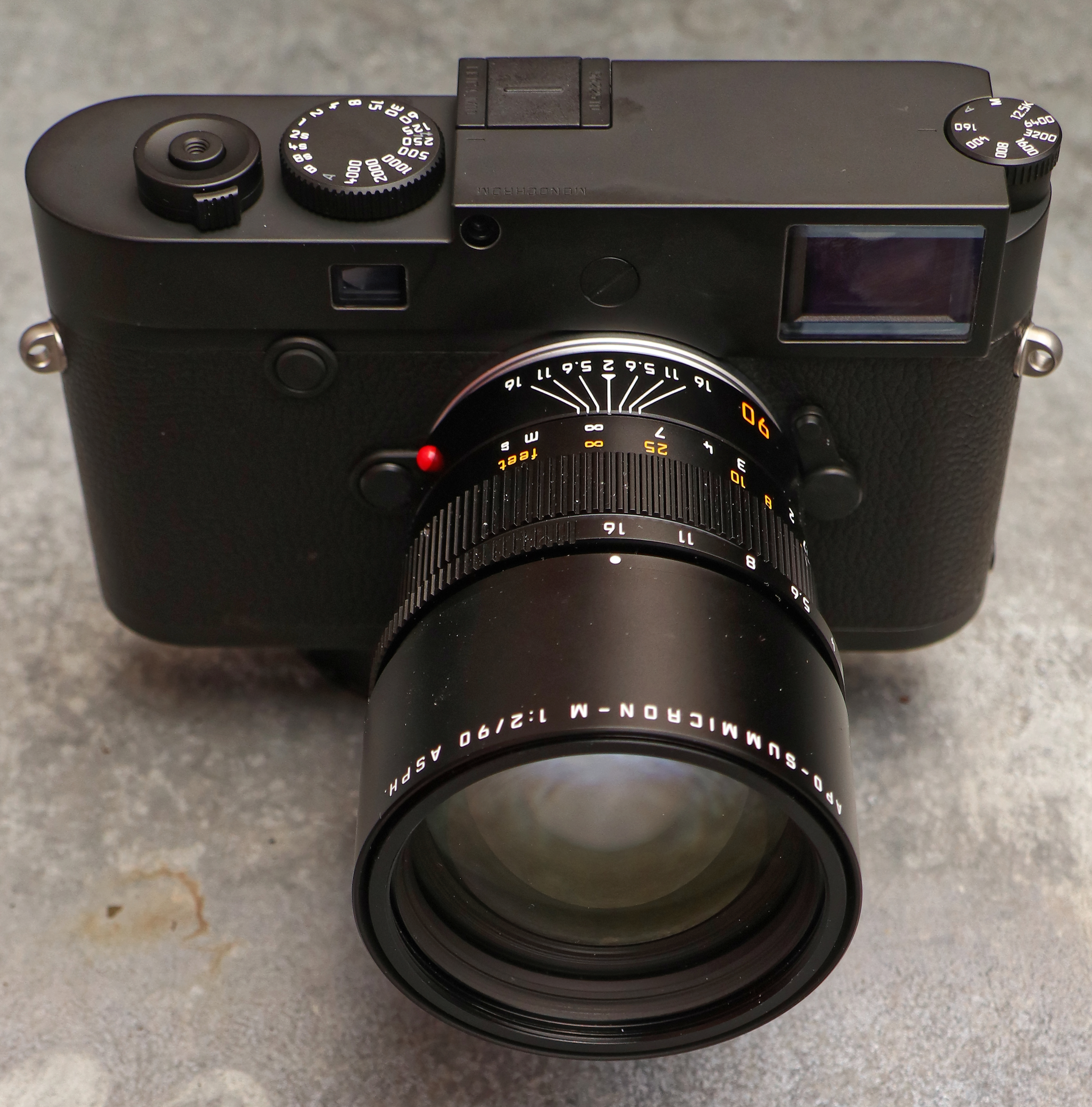

Overview
- Maker: Leica Camera
- Type: Digital rangefinder camera

Lens
- Lens mount: Leica M-mount

Sensor/medium
- Sensor: Monochrom 36 mm × 24 mm (1.42 in × 0.94 in) image sensor
- Sensor type: CMOS
- Maximum resolution: 41 Megapixels
- Film speed: 160 to 100,000
- Storage media: SD / SDHC / SDXC

Focusing
- Focus modes: Manual

Exposure/metering
- Exposure modes: Manual, aperture priority auto exposure
- Exposure metering: Exposure metering through the lens (TTL), with working aperture

Flash
- Flash: Fixed hot shoe

Shutter
- Shutter: Metal blade focal plane shutter with vertical movement
- Shutter speed range: 8 s to 1/4000

Viewfinder
- Viewfinder: Rangefinder and additional color LCD: 3", 1,036,800 pixels

General
- Battery: Lithium ion
- Dimensions: 139 mm × 80 mm × 38.5 mm (5.47 in × 3.15 in × 1.52 in)
- Weight: 660 g (23 oz)
- Made in: Germany

Chronology
- Predecessor: Leica M Monochrom (Typ 246)
- Successor: Leica M11 Monochrom

The Leica M10 Monochrom is a digital rangefinder camera manufactured by Leica Camera. It was released on 17 January 2020. A black and white only successor to the Leica M Monochrom and the Leica M Monochrom (Typ 246). The M10 Monochrom uses a full frame 40 Megapixels CMOS sensor that has no color filter array on the sensor. The Leica M10 Monochrom is physically similar to the Leica M10 and Leica M10-P with a dedicated ISO dial on the top plate. The ISO ranges from 160 to 100,000. The M10 Monochrom has a 3" color TFT LCD monitor with 1,036,800 pixels covered with Gorilla Glass. The camera is made of all-metal die cast magnesium body, wrapped in synthetic leather covering, and brass top panel and base, with black chrome plated finish.

Type		2006	2007	2008	2009	2010	2011	2012	2013	2014	2015	2016	2017	2018	2019	2020	2021	2022
Leica	M		M8			M9/ M9-P			M (240)/ M-P (240)				M10/ M10-P					M11
Leica	ME								M-E (220)			M (262)				M-E (240)		
Leica	MM								MM			MM (246)				M10M		
Leica	MD												M-D (262)		M10-D			
Leica	MR																M10-R	
Non-Leica		Epson R-D1 • Zenit M																
