= Leica M mount =

Lens mount introduced in 1954

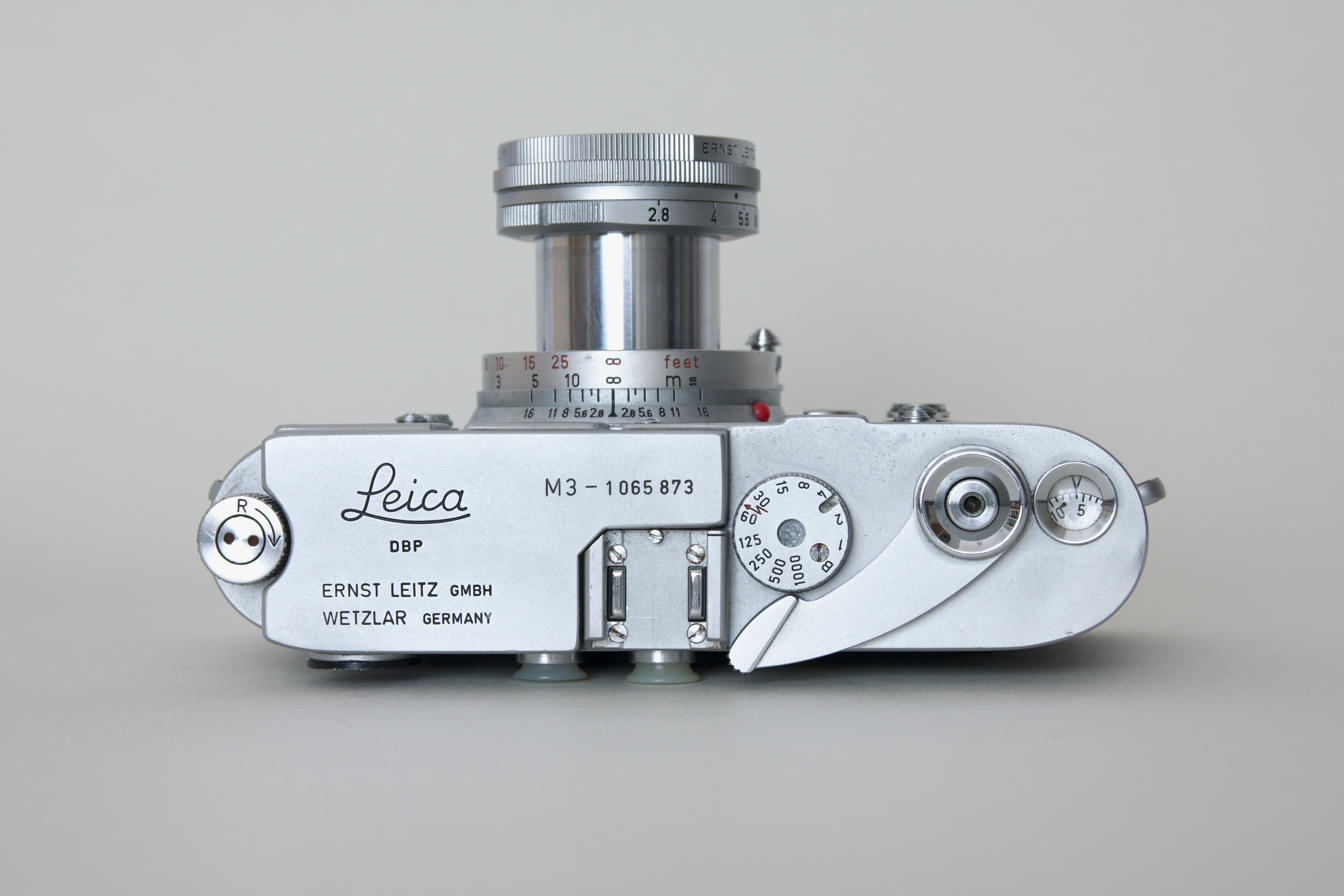
- Leica M3 and M Mount 50mm lens
- Type: Bayonet
- External diameter: 44 mm
- Tabs: 4
- Flange: 27.8 mm
- Connectors: Focal lens indicator for frame selection in the viewfinder

The Leica M mount is a camera lens mount introduced in 1954 with the Leica M3, and a range of lenses. It has been used on all the Leica M-series cameras and certain accessories (e.g. Visoflex reflex viewing attachment) up to the current film Leica M-A and digital Leica M11 cameras.

This lens mount has also been used by Epson, Ricoh, Minolta, Konica, Cosina Voigtländer, Rollei, Carl Zeiss AG and Rollei Fototechnic on some of their cameras.

== Overview ==
The Leica M mount was introduced in 1954 at that year's Photokina show, with the Leica M3 as its first camera. The 'M' stands for Messsucher or rangefinder in German. This new camera abandoned the M39 lens mount in favour of a new bayonet mount. The bayonet mount allowed lenses to be changed more quickly and made the fitting more secure. Other innovations introduced by the M3 included a single window for the viewfinder (for composition) and the rangefinder (for focusing). With a double-stroke film advance lever (later models have a single-stroke lever). The M3 was a success and over 220,000 units were sold, by the time production ended in 1966. It remains the best-selling M mount camera ever made. The M3 uses 135 film (or 35 mm film), with the canister being loaded behind a detachable bottom plate. The M3 was followed by many other M mount cameras, released over 40 years, with many of the basic concepts remaining in these designs. With the introduction of the Through-the-lens metering (TTL) in the Leica M5 and the digital Leica M8 being the most notable innovations since then.

The lenses for the M mount were also introduced in 1954 and were based on the earlier M39 thread mount. Almost all M mount lenses are Prime lenses. These lenses are divided by Leica based on their maximum aperture number (also known as f-number). They are distinguished by their names:

Name	f-number
Noctilux	f/0.95 or f/1.0 or f/1.2 or f/1.25
Summilux	f/1.4
Summicron	f/2
Summarit	f/2.4 or f/2.5
Elmarit	f/2.8
Elmar, Super Elmar	f/2.8 or f/3.4 or f/3.8 or f/4
Summaron	f/3.5 or f/5.6
Hektor	f/4.5

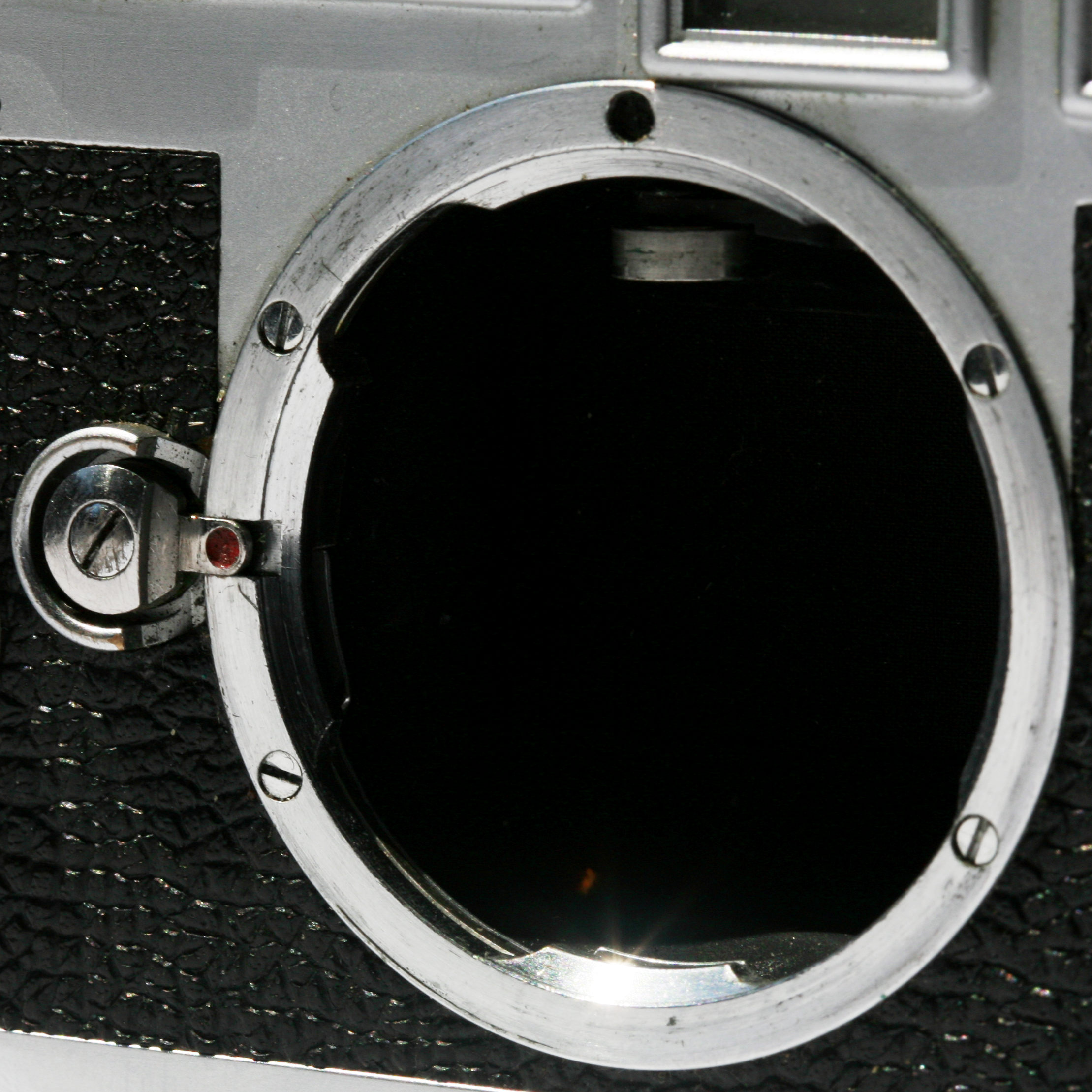
M mount female part of the bayonet on a Leica M3 body. The mechanical sensor seen inside the top of the mount is the rangefinder coupling arm

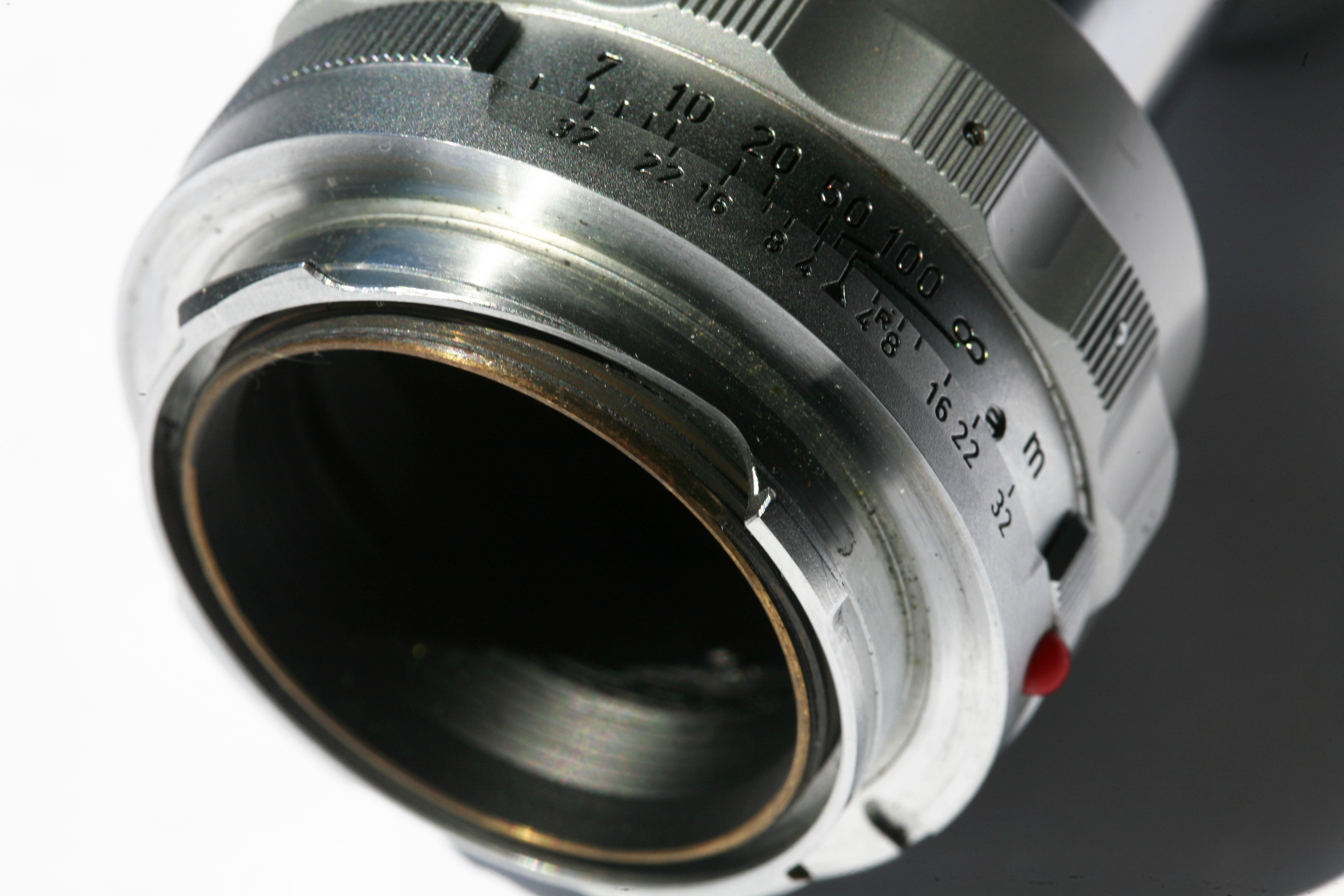
M mount male part of the bayonet on the Leica Elmar 90mm f/4.

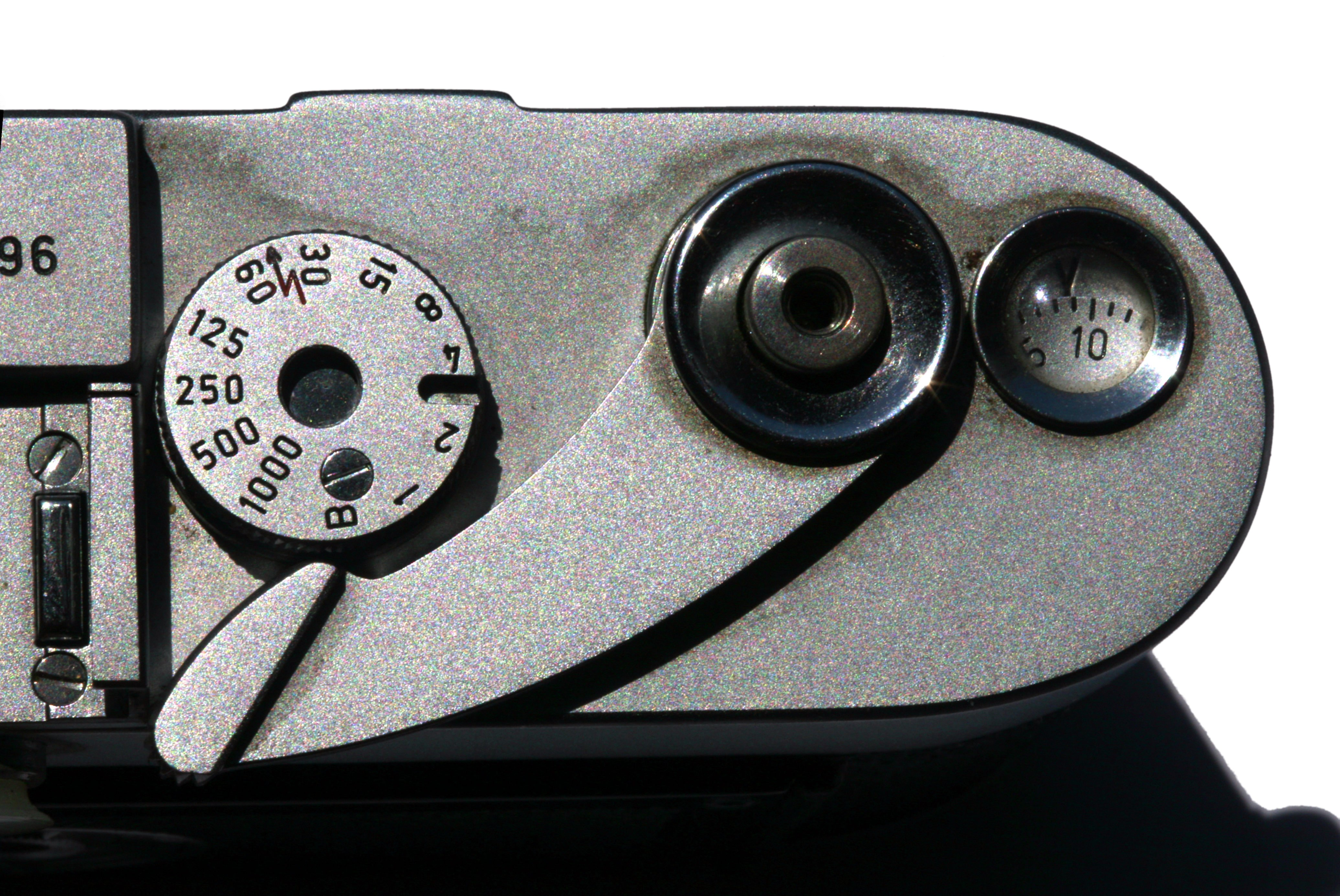
The Leica M3 shutter speed dial, film advance lever, shutter button and the frame counter.

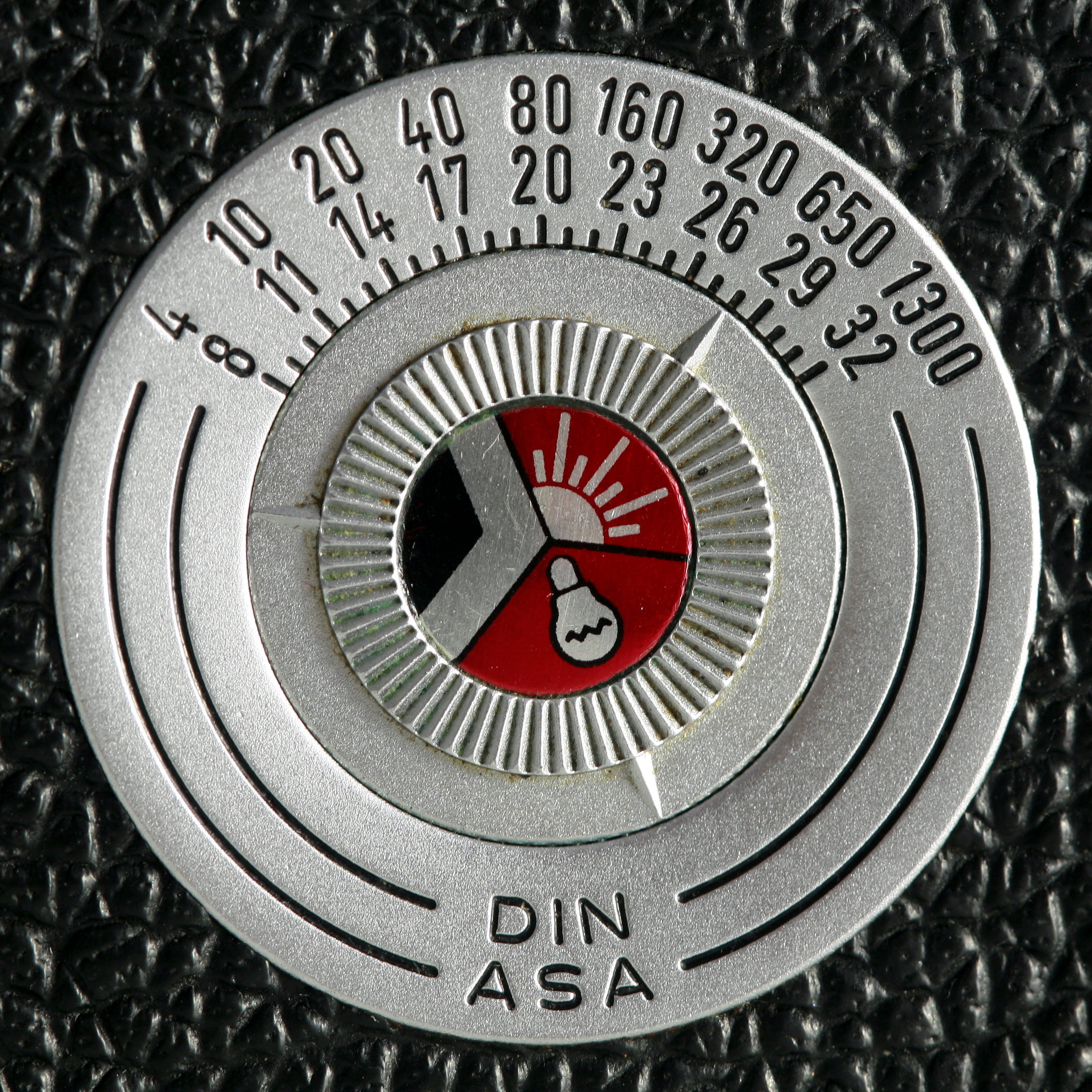
The Leica M3 ASA dial, purely decorative reminder of the Film speed showing DIN and ASA comparison dial.

Leica "red dot" logo.

== M Mount camera bodies ==
=== Film cameras ===
Image	Name	Year	Exposure	Notes
	Leica M3	1954–1966	Manual	• First bayonet M mount camera • 220,000 produced in Germany
	Leica M2	1957–1968	Manual	• Around 82,000 produced in Germany • Around 1,500 produced in Canada
	Leica M1	1959–1964	Manual	• Around 9,431 produced
	Leica M4	1964–1975	Manual	• Redesigned film loading and film winding • Introduction of the "red dot" • Versions: Leica MDa, Leica M4-2, Leica M4-P
	Leica M5	1971–1975	Manual; TTL metering	• Redesigned body • First M mount with electronic Through-the-lens metering (TTL)
	Leica M6	1984–2002, 2022–present	Manual; TTL metering	• Basically the M4 with TTL metering • Leica M6 (1984–1998) • Leica M6 TTL (1998–2002): Better viewfinder and electronic flash capability
	Leica M7	2002–2018	Manual; TTL metering Aperture priority semi-automatic	• Electronically controlled, requires battery to operate fully • Electronic shutter control and semi-automatic mode
	Leica MP	2003–present	Manual; TTL metering	• Vintage design • Removal of the "red dot"
	Leica M-A	2014–present	Manual	• Rerelease of the M3 design • Manual exposure only

=== Digital cameras ===
==== Professional ====
Image	Name	Year	Sensor	Notes
	Leica M8 and M8.2	2006–2009	10 megapixel CCD sensor, APS-H size	• Second digital M mount camera • 3936 x 2630 max resolution • 2.5″ inch screen
	Leica M9	2009–2012	18 megapixel full-frame CCD sensor	• First full-frame digital M mount camera • 5212 x 3472 max resolution • 2.5″ inch screen
	Leica M9-P	2011–2012	18 megapixel full-frame CCD sensor	• Removal of the "red dot", otherwise same as the Leica M9 • 5212 x 3472 max resolution • 2.5″ inch screen with sapphire crystal LCD glass
	Leica M (Typ 240)	2012–2017	24 megapixel full-frame CMOS sensor	• 5952 x 3976 max resolution • 3″ inch screen • Capable of capturing Full HD 1080p video
	Leica M-P (Typ 240)	2014–2017	24 megapixel full-frame CMOS sensor	• Removal of the "red dot" and 2GB of RAM, otherwise same as the Leica M (Typ 240) • 5952 x 3976 max resolution • 3″ inch screen with sapphire crystal LCD glass • Capable of capturing Full HD 1080p video
	Leica M10	2017–present	24 megapixel full-frame CMOS sensor	• 5952 x 3992 max resolution • 3″ inch screen • Wi-Fi capability
	Leica M10-P	2018–2022	24 megapixel full-frame CMOS sensor	• Removal of the "red dot", adding touch screen and quieter shutter, otherwise same as the Leica M10 • 5952 x 3992 max resolution • 3″ inch screen • Wi-Fi capability
	Leica M11	2022–present	60 megapixel full-frame BSI-CMOS sensor	• 9528 x 6328 max resolution • 3″ inch screen • No removable bottom plate • 64Gb of internal memory

==== Entry-Level ====
Image	Name	Year	Sensor	Notes
	Leica M-E (Typ 220)	2012–2015	18 megapixel CCD sensor	• 5212 x 3472 Max resolution • 2.5″ inch screen
	Leica M (Typ 262)	2015–2019	24 megapixel CMOS sensor	• 5952 x 3976 Max resolution • 3″ inch screen
	Leica M-E (Typ 240)	2019–present	24 megapixel CMOS sensor	• 5976 x 3992 Max resolution • 3″ inch screen • Capable of capturing Full HD 1080 video

==== Monochrom ====
Image	Name	Year	Sensor	Notes
	Leica M Monochrom	2012–2015	18 megapixel CCD sensor	• 5212 x 3472 Max resolution • 2.5″ inch screen • Black-and-white version of the M9
	Leica M Monochrom (Typ 246)	2015–2020	24 megapixel CMOS sensor	• 5952 x 3968 Max resolution • 3″ inch screen with sapphire crystal LCD glass • Black-and-white version of the M (Typ 240) • Capable of capturing Full HD 1080 video
	Leica M10 Monochrom	2020–present	41 megapixel CMOS sensor	• 7864 x 5200 Max resolution • 3" inch screen TFT LCD monitor • Black-and-white version of the M10 • Dedicated ISO dial with ISO 160 to ISO 100.000

==== No display ====
Image	Name	Year	Sensor	Notes
	Leica M-D (Typ 262)	2016–2018	24 megapixel CMOS sensor	• No Rear LCD Screen • The only control on the body is via the shutter speed and ISO dials
	Leica M10-D	2018–present	24 megapixel CMOS sensor	• 7840 x 5184 Max resolution • No Rear LCD Screen

==== Increased resolution ====
Image	Name	Year	Sensor	Notes
	Leica M10-R	2020–present	40 megapixel CMOS sensor	• 3" inch screen TFT LCD monitor • The only control on the body is via the shutter speed and ISO dials

=== Other manufacturers ===
- Epson R-D1 by Epson
- Minolta CLE by Minolta
- Hexar RF by Konica
- Bessa R2A, R3A, R2M, R3M, R4M and R4A by Cosina Voigtländer
- Rollei 35 RF by Rollei Fototechnic
- Recent Zeiss Ikon rangefinder camera by Carl Zeiss AG
- Ricoh GXR by Ricoh
- PIXII by Pixii SAS

== M mount lenses ==
Summary of Leica M lenses
Speed	Name	21mm	24mm	28mm	35mm	50mm	75mm	90mm	135mm
f/5.6	Summaron			✓					
f/4.0
f/4.0	Super-Angulon	✓							
f/4.0	Macro Elmar							✓	
f/4.0	Elmar							✓	✓
f/4.0	Tele-Elmar								✓
f/4.0	Tri-Elmar ASPH	16-18-21mm							
f/4.0	Tri-Elmar ASPH	28-35-50mm							
f/3.8	Elmar ASPH.		✓						
f/3.5	Summaron				✓				
f/3.4	Super-Elmar ASPH.	✓							
Apo-Telyt									✓
f/2.8	Elmar					✓			
f/2.8	Elmarit	✓		✓				✓	✓
f/2.8	Elmarit ASPH.	✓	✓	✓					
f/2.8	Tele-Elmarit							✓	
f/2.5	Summarit				✓	✓	✓	✓	
f/2	Summicron				✓	✓		✓	
f/2	Summicron ASPH.			✓	✓				
f/2	APO Summicron				✓	✓	✓	✓	
f/1.4	Summilux				✓	✓	✓		
f/1.4	Summilux ASPH.	✓	✓	✓	✓	✓		✓	
f/1.25	Noctilux ASPH.						✓		
f/1.2	Noctilux					✓			
f/1.2	Noctilux ASPH				✓	✓			
f/1	Noctilux					✓			
f/0.95	Noctilux ASPH.					✓			

=== Other manufacturers ===
- Minolta
- Zeiss
- Cosina Voigtländer
- Zenit M
- Brightin Star
- Funleader
- TTArtisan

== See also ==
- Leica Camera
- Leica thread mount
- Mirrorless interchangeable-lens camera

Type	1950s										1960s										1970s										1980s										1990s										2000s										2010s										2020s									
Type	50	51	52	53	54	55	56	57	58	59	60	61	62	63	64	65	66	67	68	69	70	71	72	73	74	75	76	77	78	79	80	81	82	83	84	85	86	87	88	89	90	91	92	93	94	95	96	97	98	99	00	01	02	03	04	05	06	07	08	09	10	11	12	13	14	15	16	17	18	19	20	21	22	23	24	25	26	27	28	29
Leica					M3																																																																											
Leica								M2																																																																								
Leica																	M4							M4		M4-2				M4-P			M6															M6 TTL						MP																										
Leica																						M5																															M7																				M6							
Leica										M1														Leica CL																																									M-A (127)															
Non-Leica	Konica Hexar RF • 35mm Bessa • Cosina Voigtländer • Minolta CLE • Rollei 35 RF • Zeiss Ikon																																																																															

Type		2006	2007	2008	2009	2010	2011	2012	2013	2014	2015	2016	2017	2018	2019	2020	2021	2022
Leica	M		M8			M9/ M9-P			M (240)/ M-P (240)				M10/ M10-P					M11
Leica	ME								M-E (220)			M (262)				M-E (240)		
Leica	MM								MM			MM (246)				M10M		
Leica	MD												M-D (262)		M10-D			
Leica	MR																M10-R	
Non-Leica		Epson R-D1 • Zenit M																
