= Leica M11 =

Digital rangefinder camera

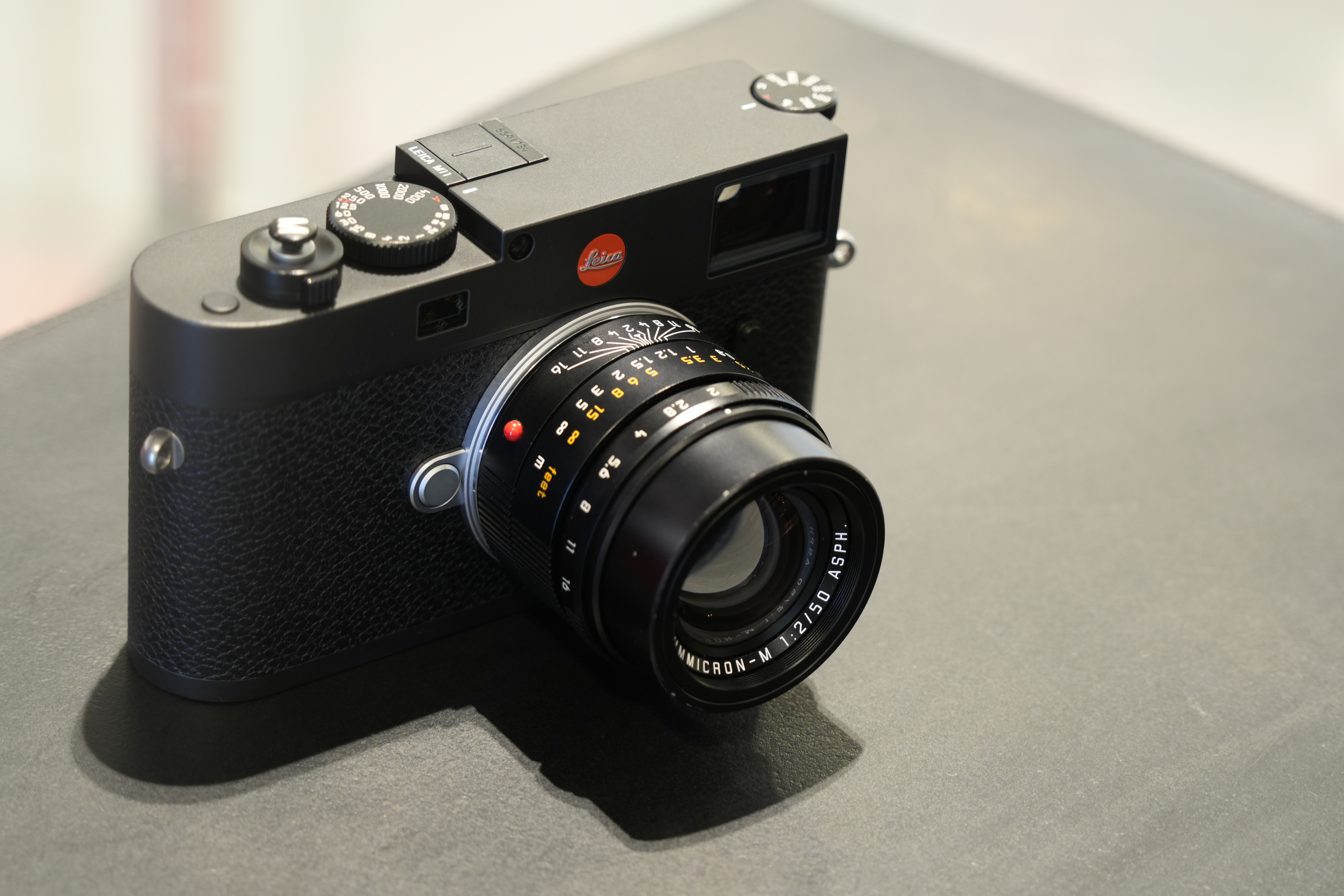

Overview
- Maker: Leica Camera
- Type: Digital rangefinder camera
- Lens mount: Leica M mount

Sensor/medium
- Sensor: 35.8 mm × 23.9 mm (1.41 in × 0.94 in) image sensor, 6.8 μm pixel size
- Sensor type: CMOS
- Maximum resolution: 60 Megapixels (RAW Color Depth:14bits)
- Film speed: 64 to 50000
- Storage media: 64 GB internal storage, one SDXC card slot

Focusing
- Focus modes: Manual

Exposure/metering
- Exposure modes: Manual, aperture priority auto exposure
- Exposure metering: TTL, spot, center weighted averaging, matrix

Flash
- Flash: Fixed hot shoe

Shutter
- Shutter: Focal plane, metal curtains, vertical travel
- Shutter speed range: 60 m to 1/16000 s

Viewfinder
- Viewfinder: Rangefinder and additional color LCD: 3", 3,000,000 pixels

General
- Battery: Lithium ion, BP-SCL7
- Dimensions: 139 mm × 80 mm × 38.5 mm (5.47 in × 3.15 in × 1.52 in)
- Weight: 530 g (19 oz) with battery (M11)
- Made in: Germany

Chronology
- Predecessor: Leica M10

The Leica M11 is a full-frame digital rangefinder camera from Leica Camera AG. It was introduced on 13 January 2022. It uses a 60.3-megapixel image sensor, and is compatible with almost all Leica M mount lenses.

== Features ==
The M11 uses a 60-megapixel (MP) back-illuminated sensor, a very thin, bonded two-layer filter in front of its sensor—one for IR blocking, and one for UV blocking—as well as three raw file sizes that each use the full frame (60, 37 and 18 MP). At 18 MP the camera offers up to 15 stops dynamic range. ISO range is 64 to 50000, with 64 being the base ISO. The camera has a built-in charger powered through USB-C.

The M11 supports most M-mount lenses.

== Release ==
The Leica M11 was introduced by Leica on 13 January 2022 in an online webcast from the factory in Wetzlar, Germany.

Along with the camera was also introduced a Visoflex 3.7 MP electronic viewfinder that attaches to the M11 as an accessory, and can be used on the previous Leica M10, Leica M10-P, Leica M10-D and Leica M10-R models with a 2.4 MP resolution.

== See also ==
- List of retro-style digital cameras

Type		2006	2007	2008	2009	2010	2011	2012	2013	2014	2015	2016	2017	2018	2019	2020	2021	2022
Leica	M		M8			M9/ M9-P			M (240)/ M-P (240)				M10/ M10-P					M11
Leica	ME								M-E (220)			M (262)				M-E (240)		
Leica	MM								MM			MM (246)				M10M		
Leica	MD												M-D (262)		M10-D			
Leica	MR																M10-R	
Non-Leica		Epson R-D1 • Zenit M																
