= Leica M Monochrom (Typ 246) =

Overview
- Maker: Leica Camera
- Type: Digital rangefinder camera

Lens
- Lens mount: Leica M-mount

Sensor/medium
- Sensor: Monochrome 35.8 mm × 23.9 mm (1.41 in × 0.94 in) image sensor
- Sensor type: CMOS
- Maximum resolution: 24 Megapixels
- Film speed: 320 to 25000
- Storage media: SD / SDHC / SDXC

Focusing
- Focus modes: Manual

Exposure/metering
- Exposure modes: Manual, aperture priority auto exposure
- Exposure metering: TTL, center weighted averaging

Flash
- Flash: Fixed hot shoe

Shutter
- Shutter: Focal plane, metal curtains, vertical travel
- Shutter speed range: 60 s to 1/4000

Viewfinder
- Viewfinder: Rangefinder and additional color LCD: 2.5", 230,000 pixels

General
- Video recording: 1080p, 720p, 640*480 (VGA); 25 fps, 24 fps, 30 fps (VGA only)
- Battery: Lithium ion
- Dimensions: 139 mm × 80 mm × 42 mm (5.5 in × 3.1 in × 1.7 in)
- Weight: 680 g (24 oz)
- Made in: Germany

Chronology
- Predecessor: Leica M Monochrom
- Successor: Leica M10 Monochrom

The Leica M Monochrom (Typ 246) is a digital rangefinder camera manufactured by Leica Camera. It was released on 30 April 2015. The Leica M Monochrom (Typ 246) uses a full frame 24 Megapixels CMOS sensor that, like its predecessor the Leica M Monochrom, has no color filter array. It is therefore Leica's second black and white only camera. It is essentially a monochrome only version of the Leica M (Typ 240). The M Monochrom (Typ 246) offers an increase in ISO range up to ISO 25,000, a new 3 inches 921,000-dot LCD and live view shooting including focus peaking and 10x magnification. Also included is full HD video recording.

The Monochrom (Typ 246) is the successor of the Leica M Monochrom. It was succeeded by the Leica M10 Monochrom.

Type		2006	2007	2008	2009	2010	2011	2012	2013	2014	2015	2016	2017	2018	2019	2020	2021	2022
Leica	M		M8			M9/ M9-P			M (240)/ M-P (240)				M10/ M10-P					M11
Leica	ME								M-E (220)			M (262)				M-E (240)		
Leica	MM								MM			MM (246)				M10M		
Leica	MD												M-D (262)		M10-D			
Leica	MR																M10-R	
Non-Leica		Epson R-D1 • Zenit M																
