= Leica M (Typ 240) =

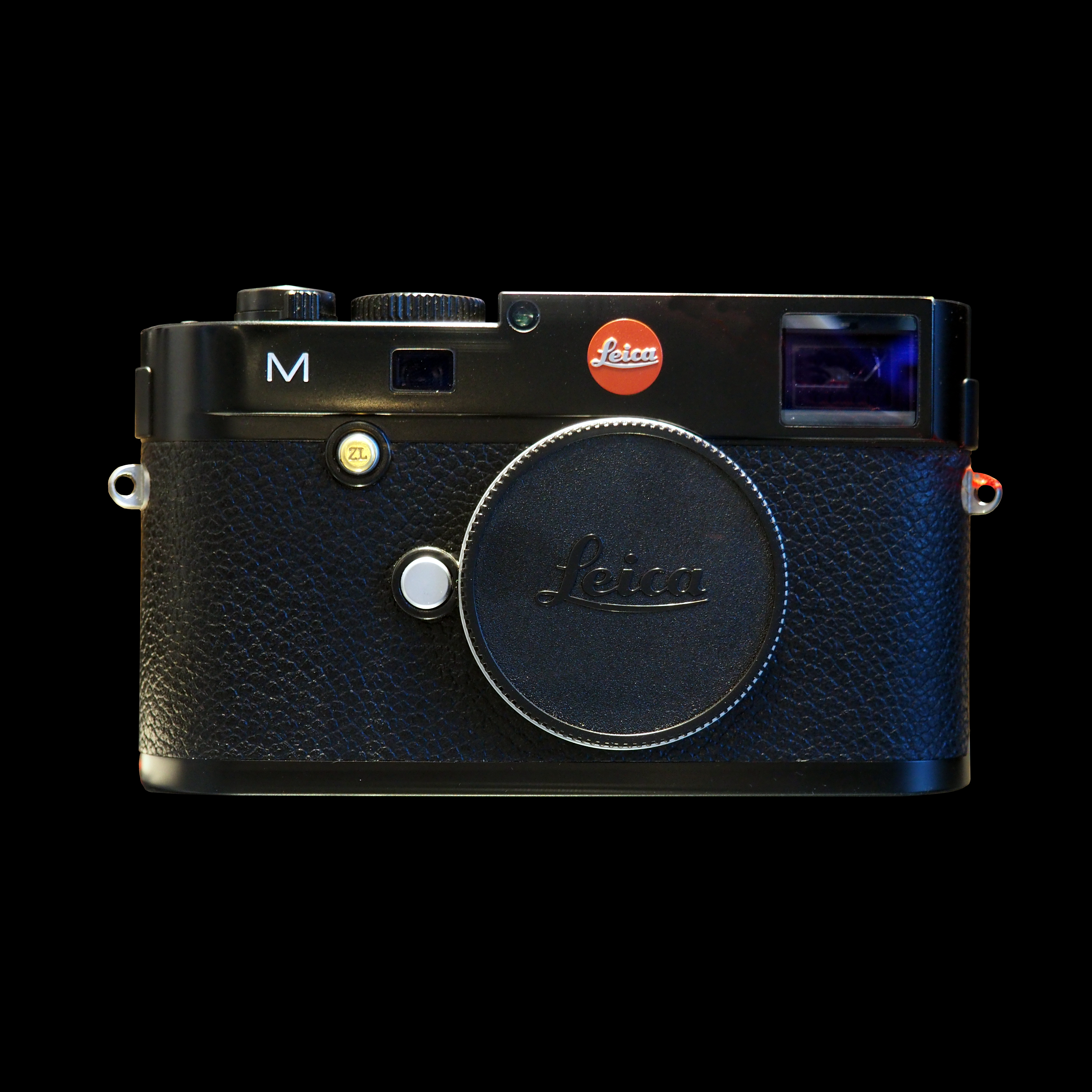

Overview
- Type: Digital rangefinder camera
- Released: September 2012

Lens
- Lens: Leica M-mount, Leica R-mount (with R-Adapter M)

Sensor/medium
- Sensor: Leica MAX 24MP designed by CMOSIS
- Sensor type: CMOS
- Sensor size: 36mm x 24mm (Full-frame), 6 μm pixel pitch
- Sensor maker: STMicroelectronics
- Maximum resolution: 5952 x 3976, 24 Megapixels
- Film speed: 200 to 6400 ISO, Pull 100 available
- Storage media: SD up to 2GB and SDHC up to 32GB

Focusing
- Focus: manual

Exposure/metering
- Exposure modes: Manual, aperture priority auto exposure
- Exposure metering: TTL, center weighted averaging

Flash
- Flash: Fixed hot shoe

Shutter
- Shutter: Focal plane, metal curtains, vertical travel
- Shutter speed range: 60s to 1/4000s

Viewfinder
- Viewfinder: Optical rangefinder, rear LCD with live view

General
- Video recording: 1080p, 720p, 640*480 (VGA); 25 fps, 24 fps, 30 fps (VGA only)
- LCD screen: 3 in (76 mm) diagonal 920k dot color LCD
- Battery: Lithium ion, 7.4V, 1,800 mAh
- Dimensions: 139 mm × 80 mm × 42 mm (5.5 in × 3.1 in × 1.7 in)
- Weight: 680 g (24 oz)

Chronology
- Predecessor: Leica M9
- Successor: Leica M10

The Leica M (Typ 240) is a full-frame digital rangefinder camera of Leica Camera AG. It was introduced in September 2012, and is the successor to the Leica M9 range of cameras. The M uses a 24-megapixel image sensor. The camera is the first M model to feature movie recording, and the first to have Live View, which allows the scene, as viewed through the lens, to be composed. The M can use most M- and R-mount lenses. Leica M cameras are made by hand in Portugal and Germany. There is also a version, the M Monochrom, with a monochrome, rather than colour, sensor.

The M Typ 240 has been superseded by variants such as the Leica M10.

== Features ==
The M uses a CMOS 24-megapixel (6,000 × 4,000 pixels) image sensor designed for Leica by the Belgian company CMOSIS, and made by STMicroelectronics in Grenoble. The pixels are on a 6 x 6 μm^{2} grid.

The M supports most M-mount lenses and, with an adapter, almost all R-mount lenses. R-lenses support an optional electronic viewfinder.

The camera uses a MAESTRO image/video processor which is based on the Fujitsu Milbeaut. It is sealed against dust and water spray.

Notably, M240/M240-P is slightly thicker than other M models.

== Reception ==
The Leica M camera was introduced at the photokina event in Cologne, Germany on 17 September 2012. The launch event included a "concert by recording artist—and Leica shooter—Seal".

In 2019, with the release of a new firmware update the Leica M (Typ 240) was discontinued.

== Leica M-P (Typ 240) ==
The Leica M-P (Typ 240) was announced on 21 August 2014 under the slogan the 'Perfect understatement', the camera was released by Leica two years following the Leica M (Typ 240). Featuring a full-frame 24 MP CMOS sensor and 2 GB of built-in RAM, Leica claims that the new M-P digital is 'twice as fast' as the standard M (Typ 240). It also features weather-sealing for protection against water and dust, its rear LCD is covered in sapphire crystal glass. The camera was released with the initial price of $7950, a $1000 more than the standard M (Typ 240).

The design of the Leica M-P was based on that of the 35 mm film Leica MP released in 2003. It harks back to the 1950s and the first M mount camera; the Leica M3. The M-P omits the Leica red dot and replaces it with a minimal Leica script logo on the top plate.

== Gallery ==
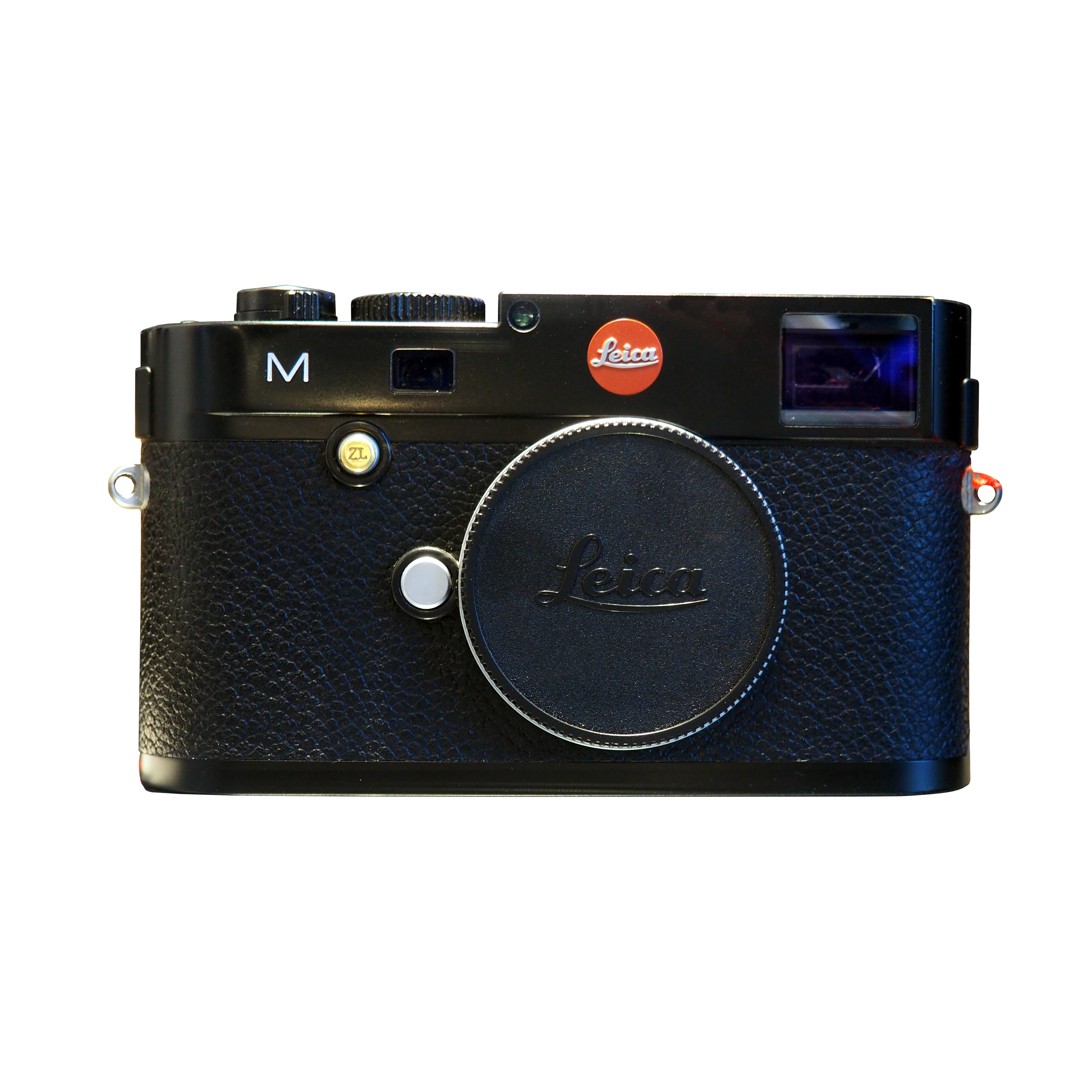
Leica M in black

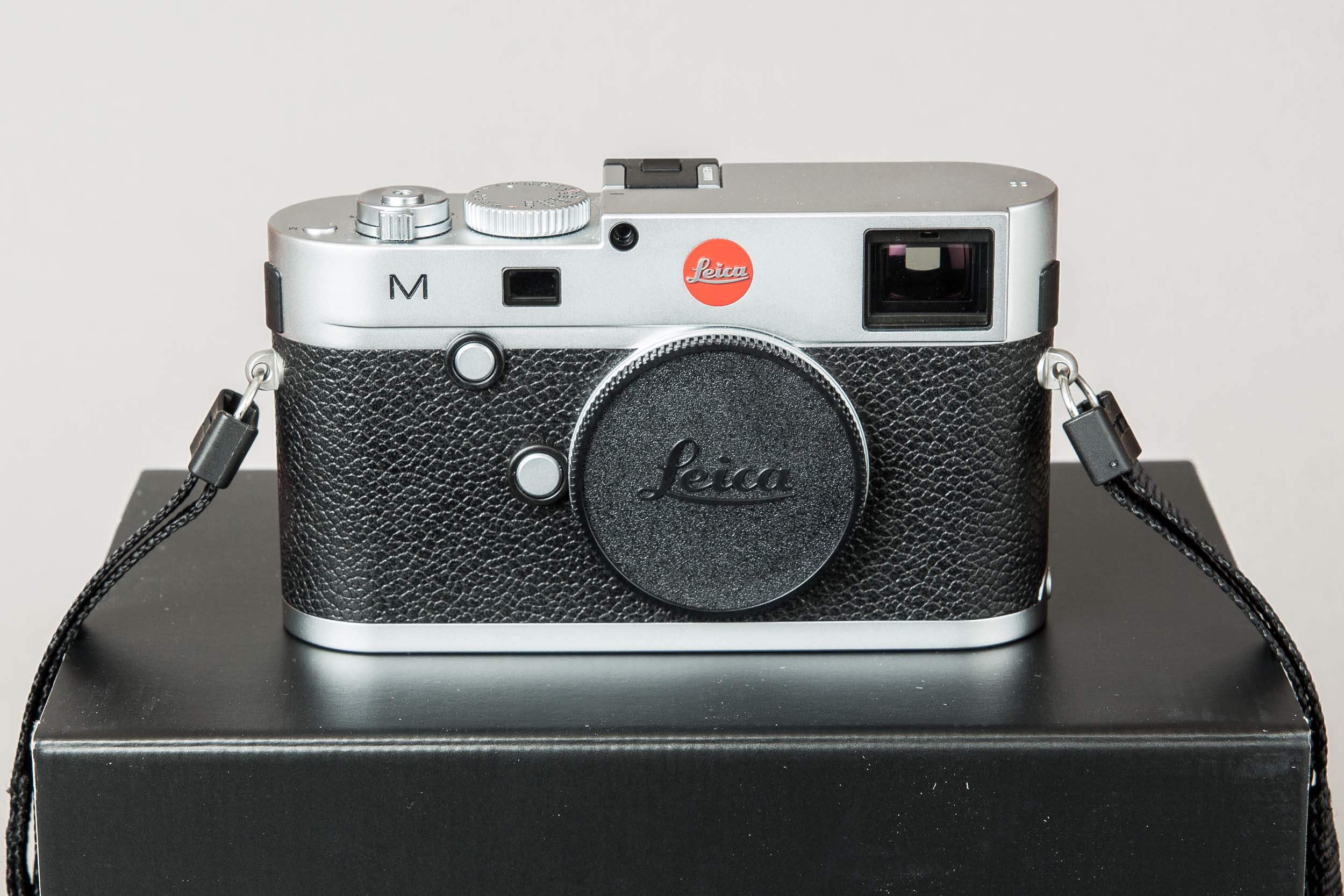
Leica M in silver

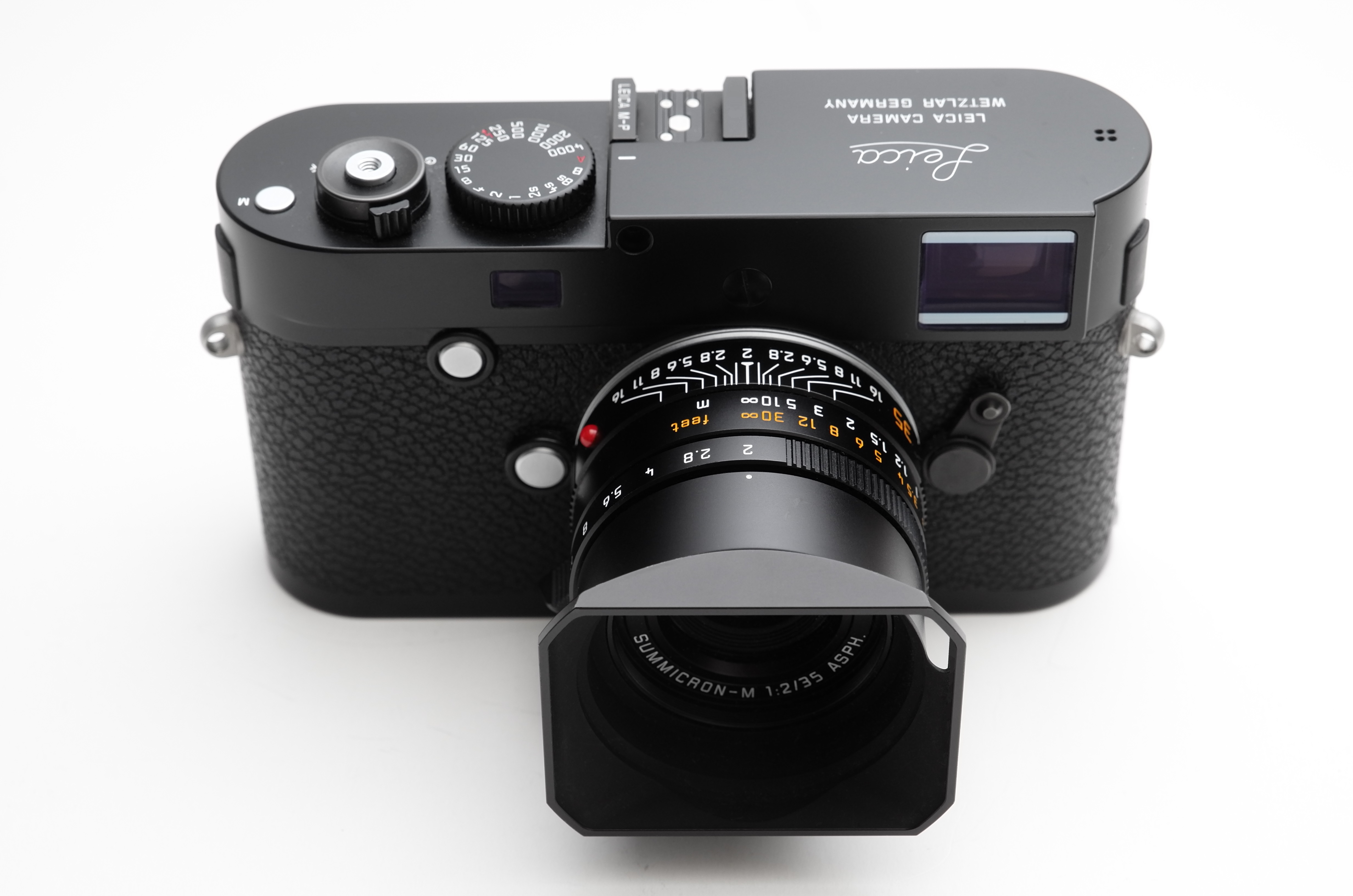
Leica M-P front view

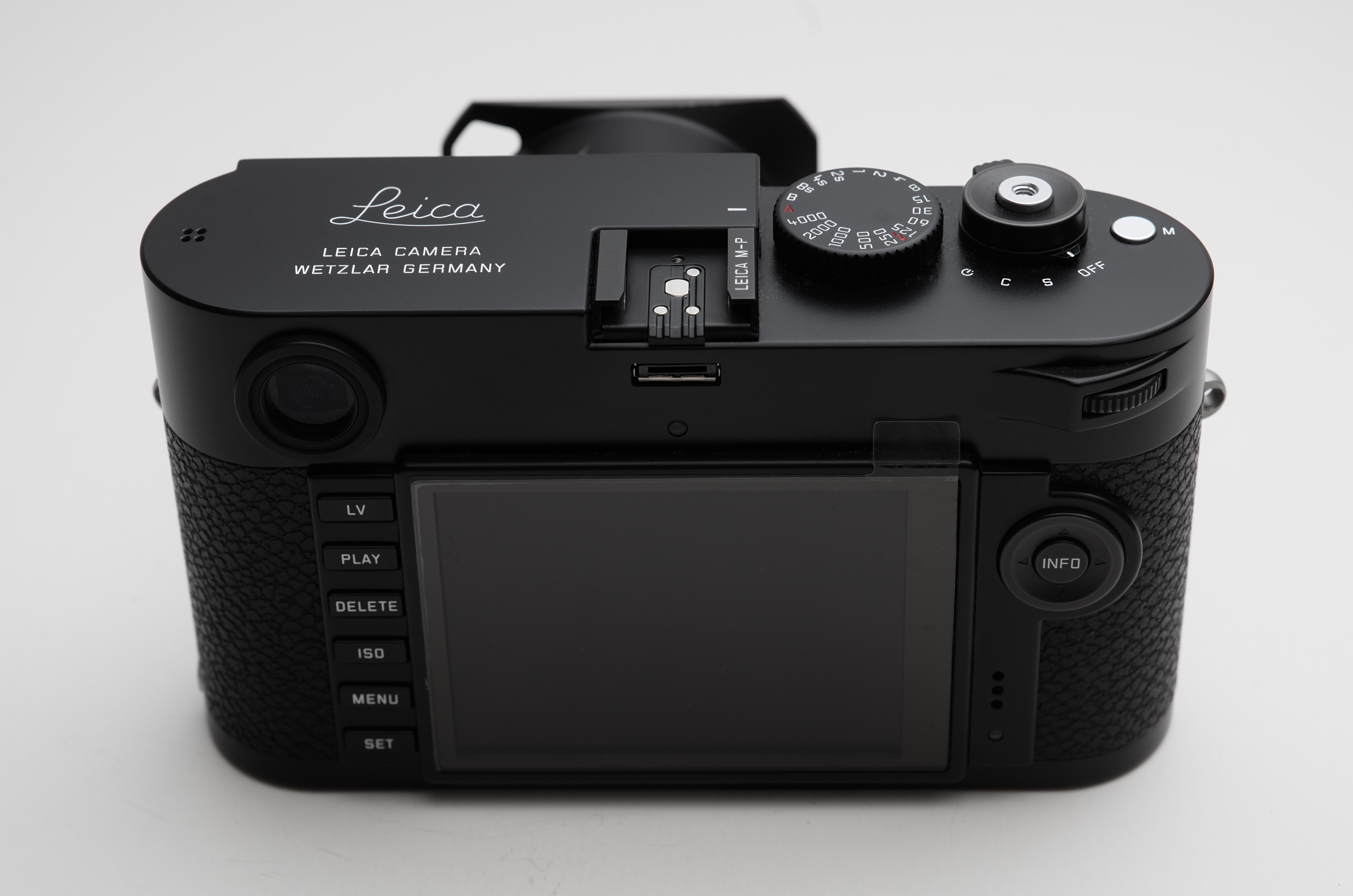
Leica M-P back view

== See also ==
- List of retro-style digital cameras

Type		2006	2007	2008	2009	2010	2011	2012	2013	2014	2015	2016	2017	2018	2019	2020	2021	2022
Leica	M		M8			M9/ M9-P			M (240)/ M-P (240)				M10/ M10-P					M11
Leica	ME								M-E (220)			M (262)				M-E (240)		
Leica	MM								MM			MM (246)				M10M		
Leica	MD												M-D (262)		M10-D			
Leica	MR																M10-R	
Non-Leica		Epson R-D1 • Zenit M																
