= Leica M-A =

Leica M-A (Typ 127)
Overview
- Maker: Leica Camera
- Type: 35 mm rangefinder camera
- Released: 2014

Lens
- Lens: Interchangeable lens, Leica M-mount

Sensor/medium
- Film format: 35 mm
- Film size: 36 mm x 24 mm
- Film speed: ISO 6-6400
- Film advance: Manual
- Film rewind: Manual

Exposure/metering
- Exposure modes: Manual (M), and Bulb (B)

Flash
- Flash: Hot shoe – accessory shoe with centre contact
- Flash synchronization: 1/50s

Shutter
- Shutter: mechanically timed horizontal running cloth shutter
- Shutter speed range: 1s - 1/1000s with Bulb and 1/50s flash sync

Viewfinder
- Viewfinder: Brightline frame viewfinder with automatic parallax-compensation
- Viewfinder magnification: 0.72x

General
- Optional motor drives: Leica Motor-M, Winder-M, Winder 4-P and Winder 4-2
- Dimensions: 138 mm × 77 mm × 38 mm (5.4 in × 3.0 in × 1.5 in)
- Weight: 578 g (20.4 oz)
- Made in: Germany

The Leica M-A (Typ 127) is a purely mechanical 35 mm rangefinder camera released by Leica Camera AG in 2014. The camera has no exposure meter, no electronic control, and no battery is required to operate it. The camera is Leica's first purely mechanical camera since the release of the Leica M4-P in 1981.

== Design ==
The specifications of the Leica M-A are very similar to the Leica M4-P, with exterior features resembling the Leica M2, which was produced by Leica from 1958 to 1968. The Leica "red dot" has been deliberately omitted. Viewed from the side the M-A is also noticeably slimmer than its digital counterparts. The camera is enclosed in all-metal using chromed brass top & bottom covers, as opposed to the aluminium top cover of the M4-P. The camera comes in black or silver chrome finish.

== Features ==
The stripped-down features of the M series cameras camera allows the photographer full manual control of all the settings without automation. The ISO dial at the back of the camera serves as a reminder of the sensitivity of the loaded film. The camera is compatible with a wide range of M-mount Lenses from 16 to 135 mm. A lever allows the photographer to change the framing lines to suit three different pairs of lenses: 28/90 mm, 35/135 mm, and 50/75 mm.

Type	1950s										1960s										1970s										1980s										1990s										2000s										2010s										2020s									
Type	50	51	52	53	54	55	56	57	58	59	60	61	62	63	64	65	66	67	68	69	70	71	72	73	74	75	76	77	78	79	80	81	82	83	84	85	86	87	88	89	90	91	92	93	94	95	96	97	98	99	00	01	02	03	04	05	06	07	08	09	10	11	12	13	14	15	16	17	18	19	20	21	22	23	24	25	26	27	28	29
Leica					M3																																																																											
Leica								M2																																																																								
Leica																	M4							M4		M4-2				M4-P			M6															M6 TTL						MP																										
Leica																						M5																															M7																											
Leica										M1														Leica CL																																									M-A (127)															
Non-Leica	Konica Hexar RF • 35mm Bessa • Cosina Voigtländer • Minolta CLE • Rollei 35 RF • Zeiss Ikon																																																																															
