= Leica MP =

35 mm rangefinder camera by Leica AG

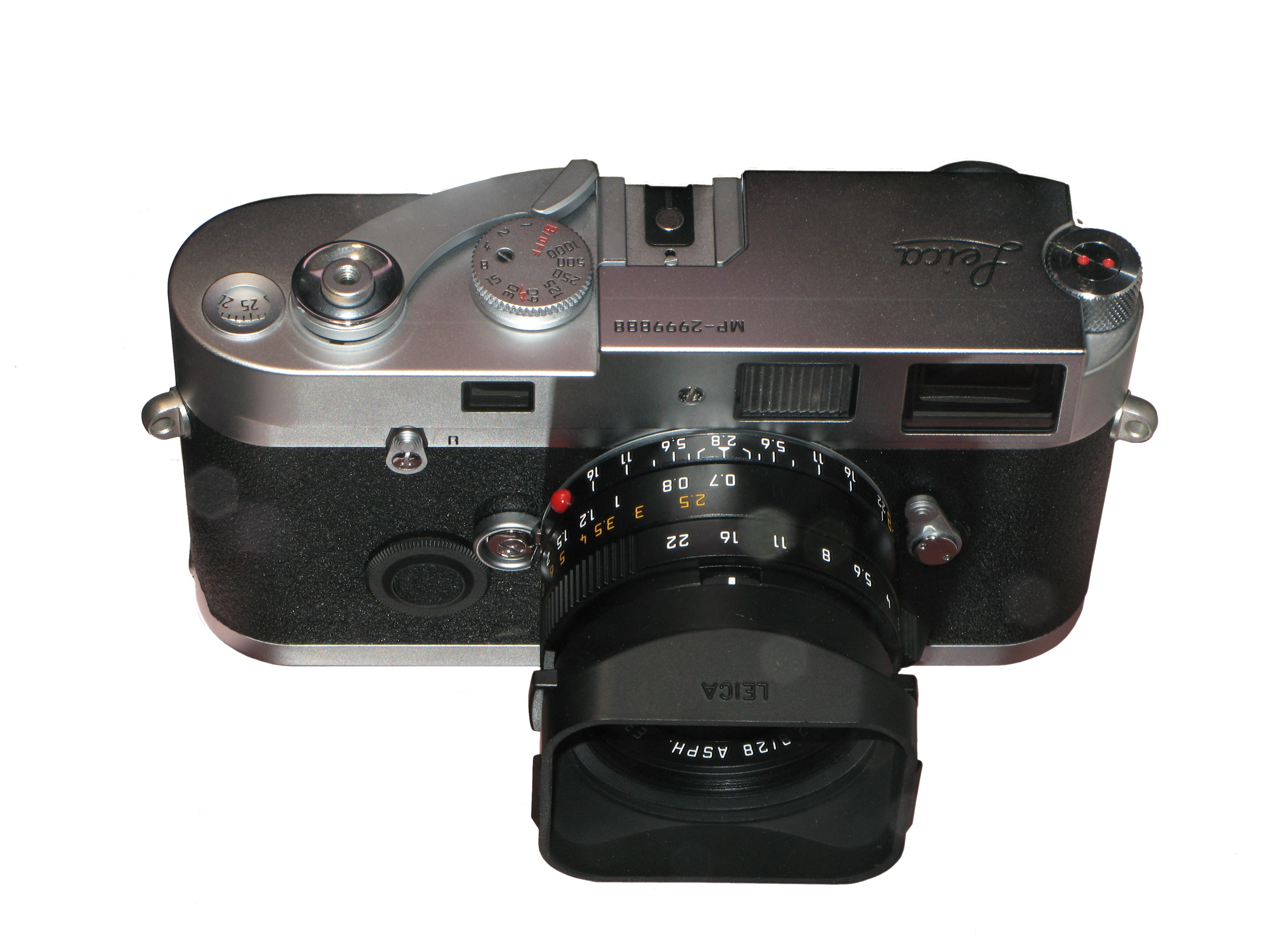

Overview
- Maker: Leica Camera
- Type: 35 mm rangefinder camera
- Released: 2003

Lens
- Lens: Interchangeable lens, Leica M-mount

Sensor/medium
- Film format: 35mm
- Film size: 36mm x 24mm
- Film speed: ISO 6-6400
- Film speed detection: Manual setting
- Film advance: Manual
- Film rewind: Manual

Focusing
- Focus modes: Split and superposed-image rangefinder

Exposure/metering
- Exposure modes: Manual (M), and Bulb (B)
- Exposure metering: 12 mm Silicon Photodiode
- Metering modes: Center-weighted (13% of full film format)

Flash
- Flash: Hot Shoe, PC Sync
- Flash synchronization: 1/50s

Shutter
- Shutter: mechanically timed horizontal running cloth shutter
- Shutter speed range: 1s - 1/1000s with Bulb and 1/50s flash sync

Viewfinder
- Viewfinder: Brightline frame viewfinder with automatic parallax-compensation
- Viewfinder magnification: 0.58x, 0.72x, 0.85x

General
- Battery: 3v from 2x PX76/SR44 silver oxide cell or 1x DL 1/3N lithium cell
- Optional motor drives: Leica Motor-M, Winder-M, Winder 4-P and Winder 4-2
- Dimensions: 138 mm × 77 mm × 38 mm (5.4 in × 3.0 in × 1.5 in)
- Weight: 585 g (20.6 oz)
- Made in: Germany

The Leica MP is a 35 mm film camera manufactured by Leica Camera AG that was introduced in 2003. It is an all-mechanical rangefinder focusing camera that follows in a long line of cameras since the Leica M3 was introduced in 1954. The camera uses the Leica M-mount, which accepts all Leica bayonet-mount lenses (10 mm through 135 mm) made since 1954. The 'MP' designation stands for "mechanical perfection."

== Design ==
Unlike the preceding Leica M7, the camera has adopted many retro design features from the earlier M3. These include a M3 type metal film advance lever, knob film rewind design and M3 type frameline adjust lever. The basic classic design remains unchanged and the design for loading film from the bottom has been retained. The camera comes in black paint or silver chrome finishes and could be further customised with Leica AG's à la carte program until July 7, 2019, when Leica officially discontinued the program.

== Leica MP special editions ==
The Leica MP, the same as the M6, also includes limited special editions.

- Leica MP-6 - 2003 - 250 cameras
- Leica MP Hammertone LHSA - 2003 - 1000 sets
- Leica MP Edition Hermès - 2003 - 500 cameras
- Leica MP Anthracite - 2004 - 600 cameras
- Leica MP Classic Black Paint - 2004 - 500 sets
- Leica MP Ralph Gibson Black - 2004 - 50 cameras
- Leica MP-3 LHSA - 2005 - 1000 sets
- Leica MP Republic of Korea - 60th Year of Independence 2007 - 2005 - 60 cameras
- Leica MP Titan Ginza Leica Store - 2007 - 150 cameras
- Leica MP Olive Kyoto Leica Store - 2008
- Leica MP Gold PRC - 2009 - 60 cameras
- Leica M3-P Leica Store Vienna - 2011 - 20 cameras
- Leica MP Republic of China Centennial Limited Edition - 2011 - 100 cameras
- Leica MP Black Paint 70th Anniversary Republic of Korea - 2015 - 70 cameras
- Leica MP Meister Edition "Blue Stain" - 2017 - 10 cameras
- Leica MP Terry O' Neill - 2018 - 35 cameras
- Leica MP Leica Historica 1975-2020 - 2021 - 45 cameras

== Features ==
Features include an integrated silicon photodiode TTL lightmeter that works from EV-2 to EV20. Only the lightmeter requires batteries to operate; the rest of the camera is fully mechanical, unlike the M7, and will operate without electricity. The camera's viewfinder is available with different magnifications of 0.58x, 0.72x and 0.85x and is improved to reduce flaring with multicoated glass elements and a condenser lens. The camera is also compatible with Leica Motor-M, Winder-M, Winder 4-P and Winder 4-2 motorised film winders and the Leicavit manual winder.

Type	1950s										1960s										1970s										1980s										1990s										2000s										2010s										2020s									
Type	50	51	52	53	54	55	56	57	58	59	60	61	62	63	64	65	66	67	68	69	70	71	72	73	74	75	76	77	78	79	80	81	82	83	84	85	86	87	88	89	90	91	92	93	94	95	96	97	98	99	00	01	02	03	04	05	06	07	08	09	10	11	12	13	14	15	16	17	18	19	20	21	22	23	24	25	26	27	28	29
Leica					M3																																																																											
Leica								M2																																																																								
Leica																	M4							M4		M4-2				M4-P			M6															M6 TTL						MP																										
Leica																						M5																															M7																				M6							
Leica										M1														Leica CL																																									M-A (127)															
Non-Leica	Konica Hexar RF • 35mm Bessa • Cosina Voigtländer • Minolta CLE • Rollei 35 RF • Zeiss Ikon																																																																															
