= Leica M Monochrom =

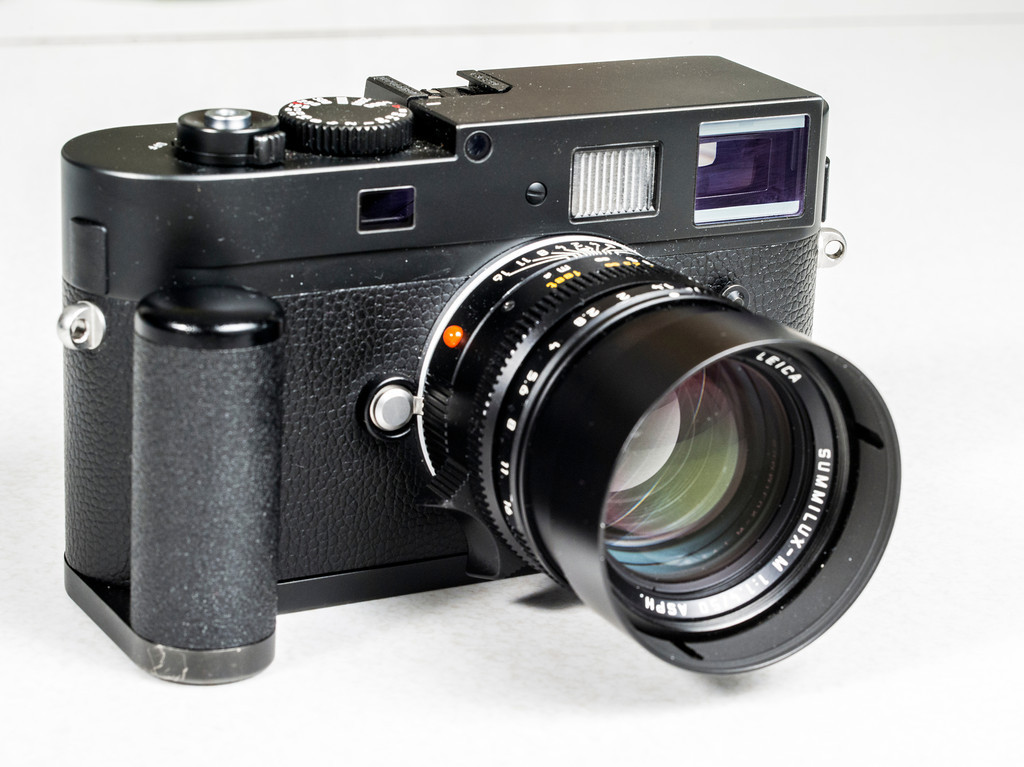

Overview
- Maker: Leica Camera
- Type: Digital rangefinder camera

Lens
- Lens mount: Leica M-mount

Sensor/medium
- Sensor: Monochrome 35.8 mm × 23.9 mm (1.41 in × 0.94 in) image sensor
- Maximum resolution: 18 Megapixels
- Film speed: 320 to 10000
- Storage media: SD up to 2 GB and SDHC up to 32 GB

Focusing
- Focus modes: Manual

Exposure/metering
- Exposure modes: Manual, aperture priority auto exposure
- Exposure metering: TTL, center weighted averaging

Flash
- Flash: Fixed hot shoe

Shutter
- Shutter: Focal plane, metal curtains, vertical travel
- Shutter speed range: 32 s to 1/4000

Viewfinder
- Viewfinder: Rangefinder and additional color LCD: 2.5", 230,000 pixels

General
- Battery: Lithium ion
- Dimensions: 139 mm × 80 mm × 37 mm (5.5 in × 3.1 in × 1.5 in)
- Weight: 600 g (21 oz)
- Made in: Germany

Chronology
- Successor: Leica M Monochrom (Typ 246)

The Leica M Monochrom is a full-frame digital rangefinder camera of Leica Camera AG, and features a monochrome sensor. The camera was announced on May 10, 2012. Delivery started September 2012 in black finish only. A Leica M Monochrom in Silver was announced May 22, 2014.

The camera was succeeded by the Leica M Monochrom (Typ 246) in 2015.

== Details ==
The nickname for the camera through design and development at Leica Camera AG was "Henri" as a tribute to Henri Cartier-Bresson but at introduction, Leica Camera AG decided on the name Leica M Monochrom.

The camera is based on the same Kodak CCD sensor as the Leica M9 but without the color filter array. This makes the sensor one stop faster and the base ISO of the sensor is 320 ISO instead of the 160 ISO of the Leica M9. The body of the Leica M Monochrom is likewise based on the Leica M9 with few changes of the metals, leather and paint used.

Leica claim that the camera delivers 100% sharper images than monochrome images derived from a camera with a color sensor (of comparable megapixels). The camera is able to alter the captured image to apply three toning effects (called sepia, cold, and selenium).

The achieved sharpness is due to the lack of a color filter array, thus avoiding the process of demosaicing by capturing the true luminance value of each photosensor. The removal of the color filter array also means that no incoming light is filtered, making the sensor more light sensitive, which explains the high native ISO of 320.

Type		2006	2007	2008	2009	2010	2011	2012	2013	2014	2015	2016	2017	2018	2019	2020	2021	2022
Leica	M		M8			M9/ M9-P			M (240)/ M-P (240)				M10/ M10-P					M11
Leica	ME								M-E (220)			M (262)				M-E (240)		
Leica	MM								MM			MM (246)				M10M		
Leica	MD												M-D (262)		M10-D			
Leica	MR																M10-R	
Non-Leica		Epson R-D1; Zenit M																
