= Leica M9 =

2009 full-frame digital rangefinder camera

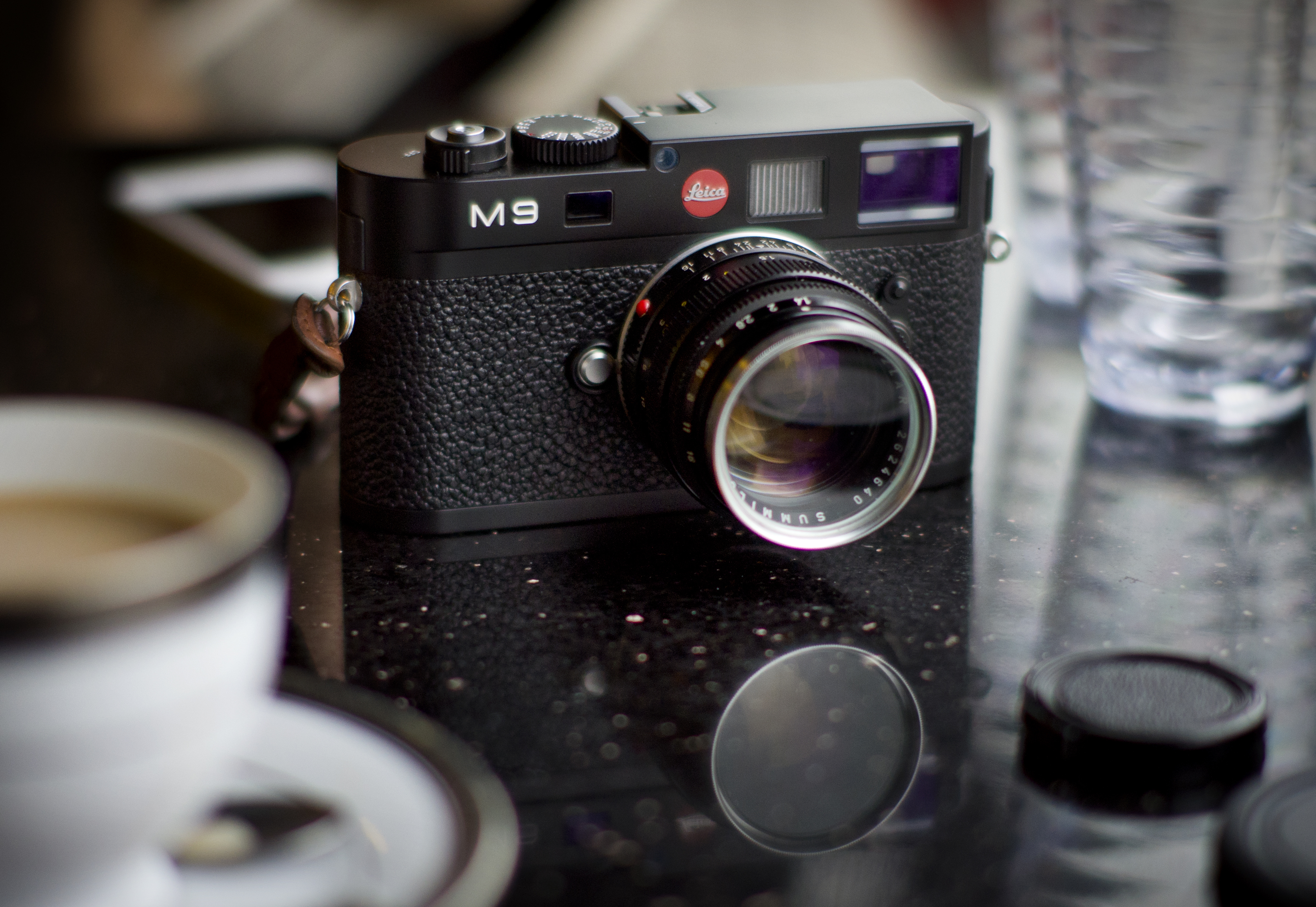

Overview
- Maker: Leica Camera
- Type: Digital rangefinder camera
- Lens mount: Leica M mount

Sensor/medium
- Sensor: 35.8 mm × 23.9 mm (1.41 in × 0.94 in) image sensor, 6.8 μm pixel size
- Sensor type: CCD
- Sensor maker: Kodak
- Maximum resolution: 18.5 Megapixels(RAW Color Depth:12bits)
- Film speed: 80 to 2500
- Storage media: SD up to 2GB and SDHC up to 32GB

Focusing
- Focus modes: Manual

Exposure/metering
- Exposure modes: Manual, aperture priority auto exposure
- Exposure metering: TTL, center weighted averaging

Flash
- Flash: Fixed hot shoe

Shutter
- Shutter: Focal plane, metal curtains, vertical travel
- Shutter speed range: 32s to 1/4000s

Viewfinder
- Viewfinder: Rangefinder and additional color LCD: 2.5", 230,000 pixels

General
- Battery: Lithium ion
- Dimensions: 139 mm × 80 mm × 37 mm (5.5 in × 3.1 in × 1.5 in)
- Weight: 585 g (20.6 oz) with battery (M9); 600 g (21 oz) with battery (M9-P)
- Made in: Germany

Chronology
- Predecessor: Leica M8
- Successor: Leica M (Typ 240)

The Leica M9 is a full-frame digital rangefinder camera from Leica Camera AG. It was introduced in September 2009. It uses an 18.5-megapixel Kodak image sensor and is compatible with almost all M mount lenses.

== Features ==
The M9 uses an 18.5-megapixel Kodak (KAF-18500) CCD image sensor that was developed specifically for the camera. The M9 boasts frameline pairs for 28/90, 35/135 and 50/75 and it supports most M-mount lenses—with only a few older models not suitable due to protruding elements of the lens into the camera body.

== Reception ==
The M9 was introduced by Leica on 9 September 2009, in New York City. The launch (which also introduced the Leica X1 and Leica S2 models) included a live video webcast, and featured a guest appearance by the musician Seal.

In 2011, Leica verified a malfunction that may prevent the camera from saving images to certain SanDisk cards and issued a firmware update in July 2012, that made "further improvements of SD-Card compatibility".

== Leica M9 Titanium ==
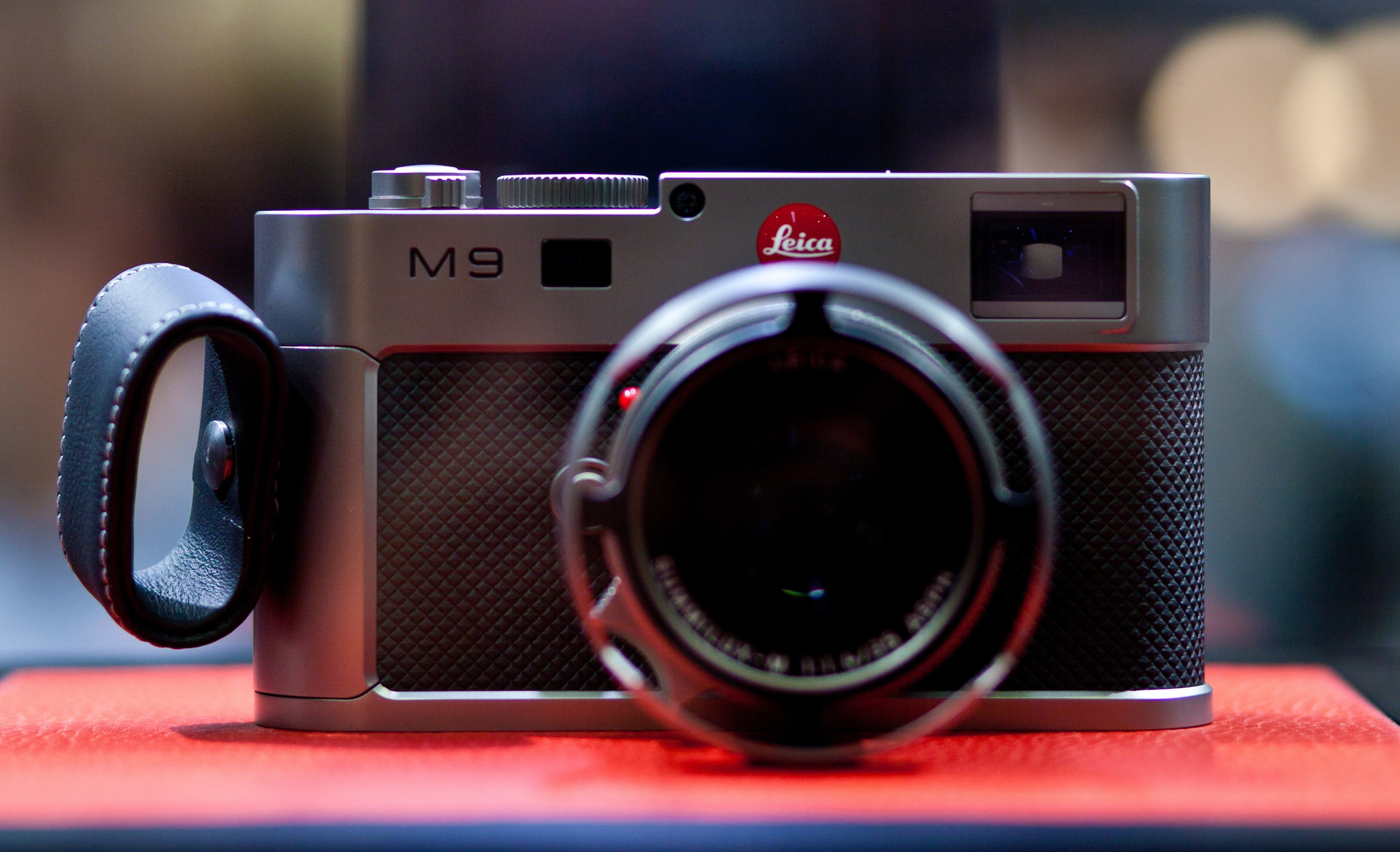
The Leica M9 Titanium, designed by Walter de Silva

In 2010, Leica released the Leica M9 Titanium camera body (a variant of the M9), which was designed by Walter de Silva. The body and supplied lens (a Summilux-M 35mm f/1.4 ASPH FLE) are both built from solid titanium. The M9 Titanium is available in a limited run of 500 cameras and costs about $31,300.

== Leica M9-P ==
The Leica M9-P camera body was announced in 2011; it was not intended as a replacement for the M9, however, as the two camera bodies were sold concurrently. Leica added a scratch-resistant sapphire LCD cover on the M9-P, and the steel grey paint option was replaced with a classic chrome cover. The black paint option is still available. The M9-P also replaces the body covering with vulcanite, as used on earlier M cameras. Leica removed the red circular logo on the front of the camera (as found on the M9), and replaced it with the company's name etched on the top of the M9-P.

== Leica M-E ==
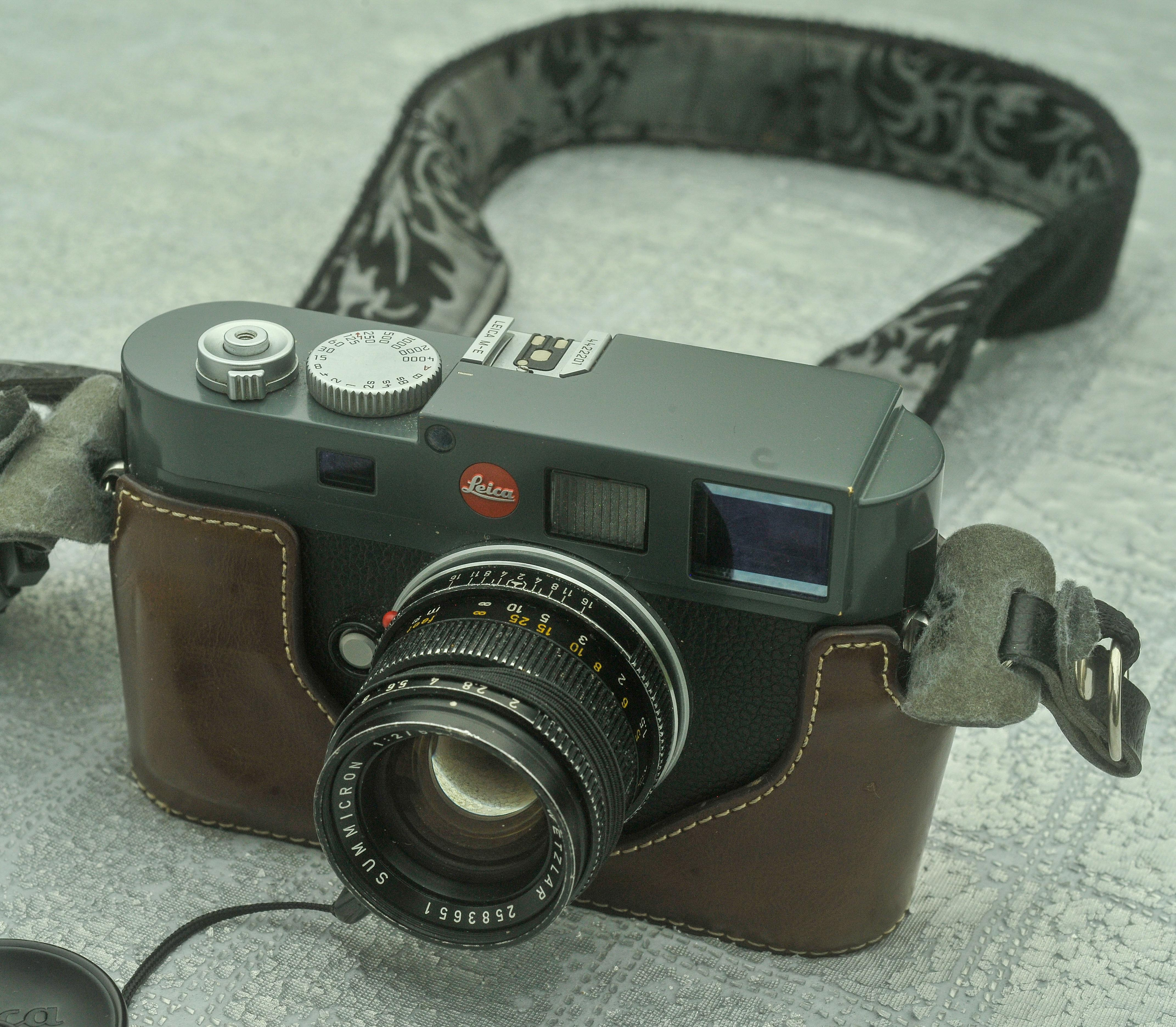
Leica M-E with Summicron Lens

The Leica M-E camera body was announced in September 2012. It is similar to the M9 and M9-P cameras, but is missing the frame-line selection lever (a mechanism which allows the photographer to assess the field of view of lenses with different focal lengths without having to mount them), and the USB port. This is the cheapest model in the Leica M range.

== Gallery ==
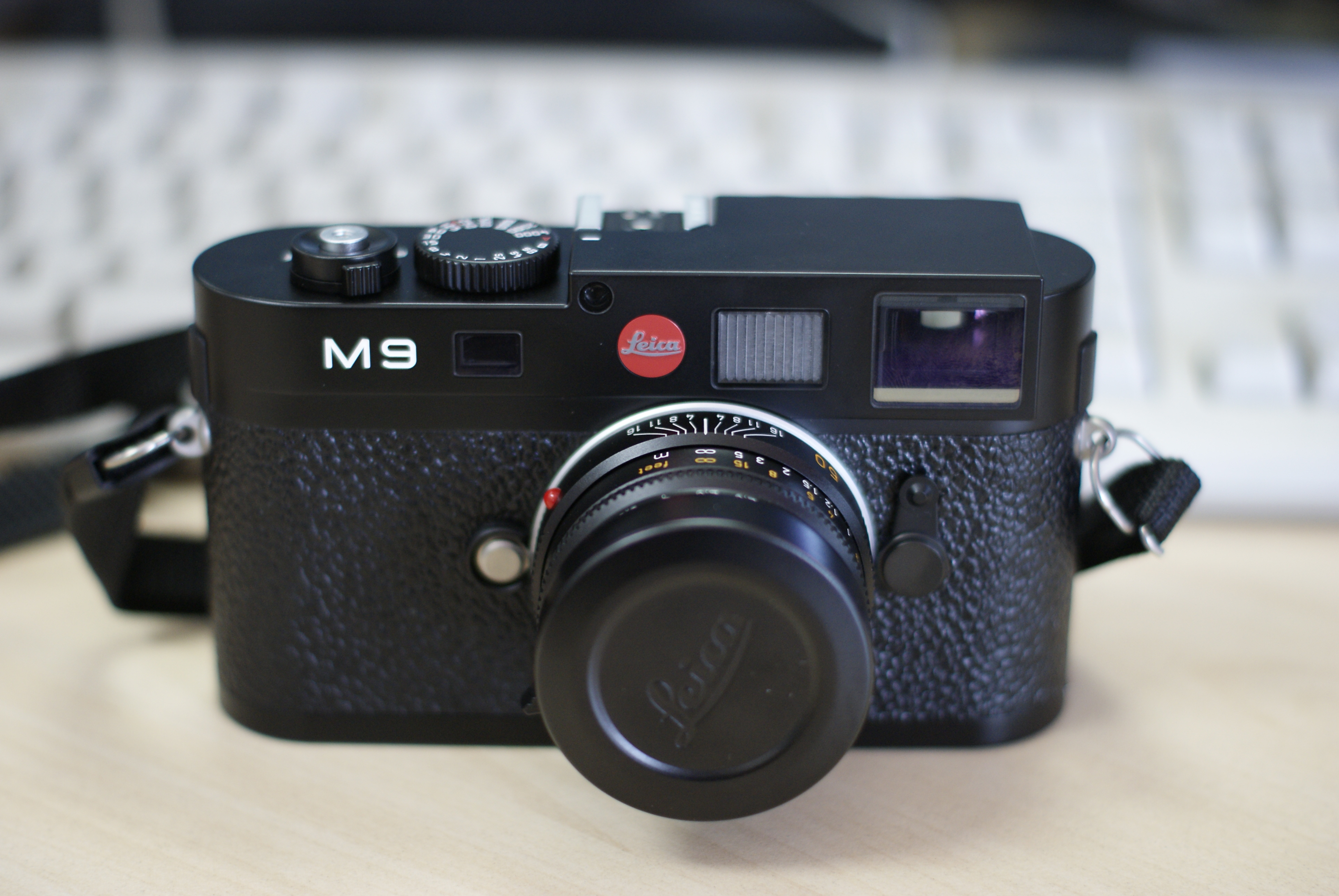
Leica M9 in black

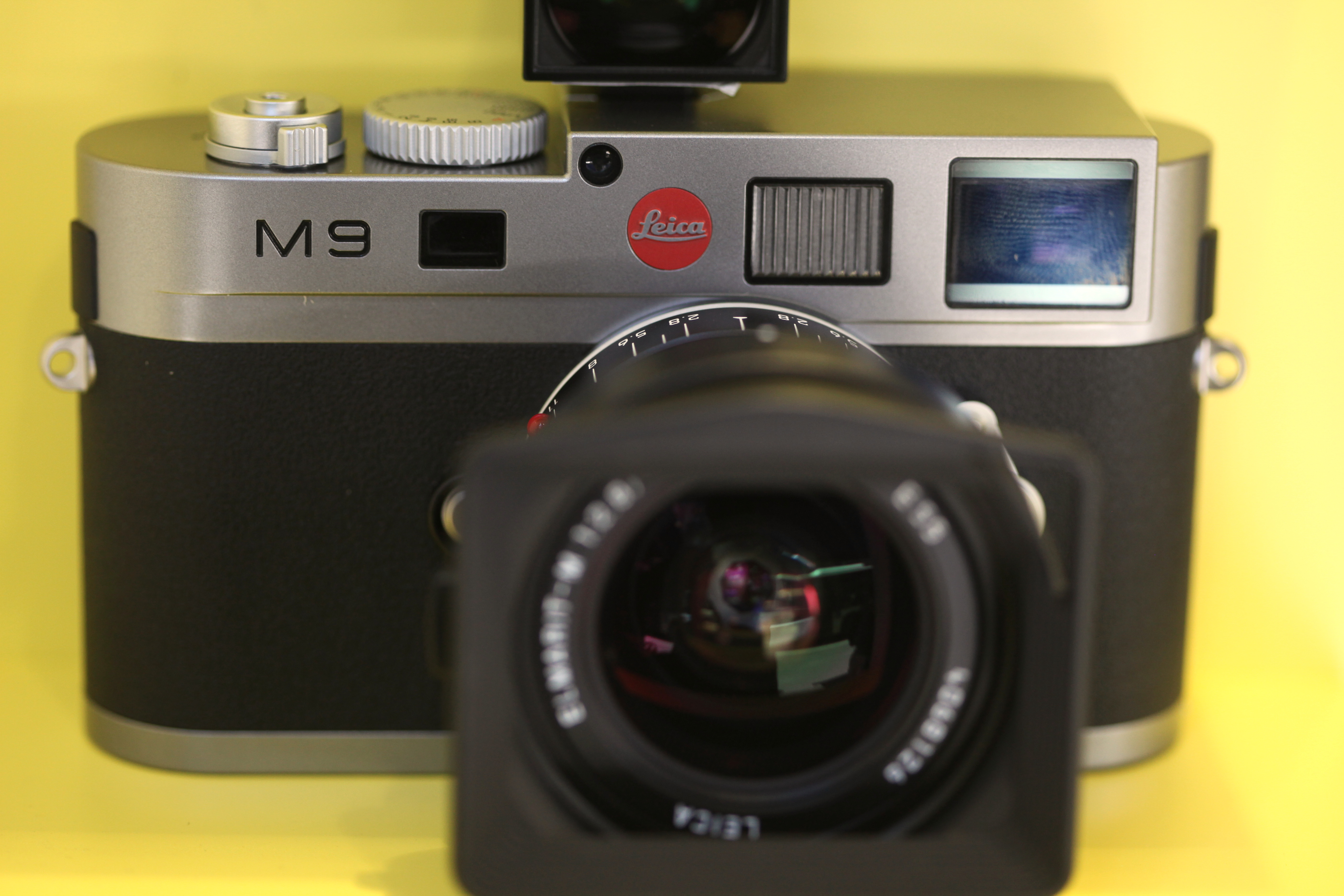
Leica M9 in silver

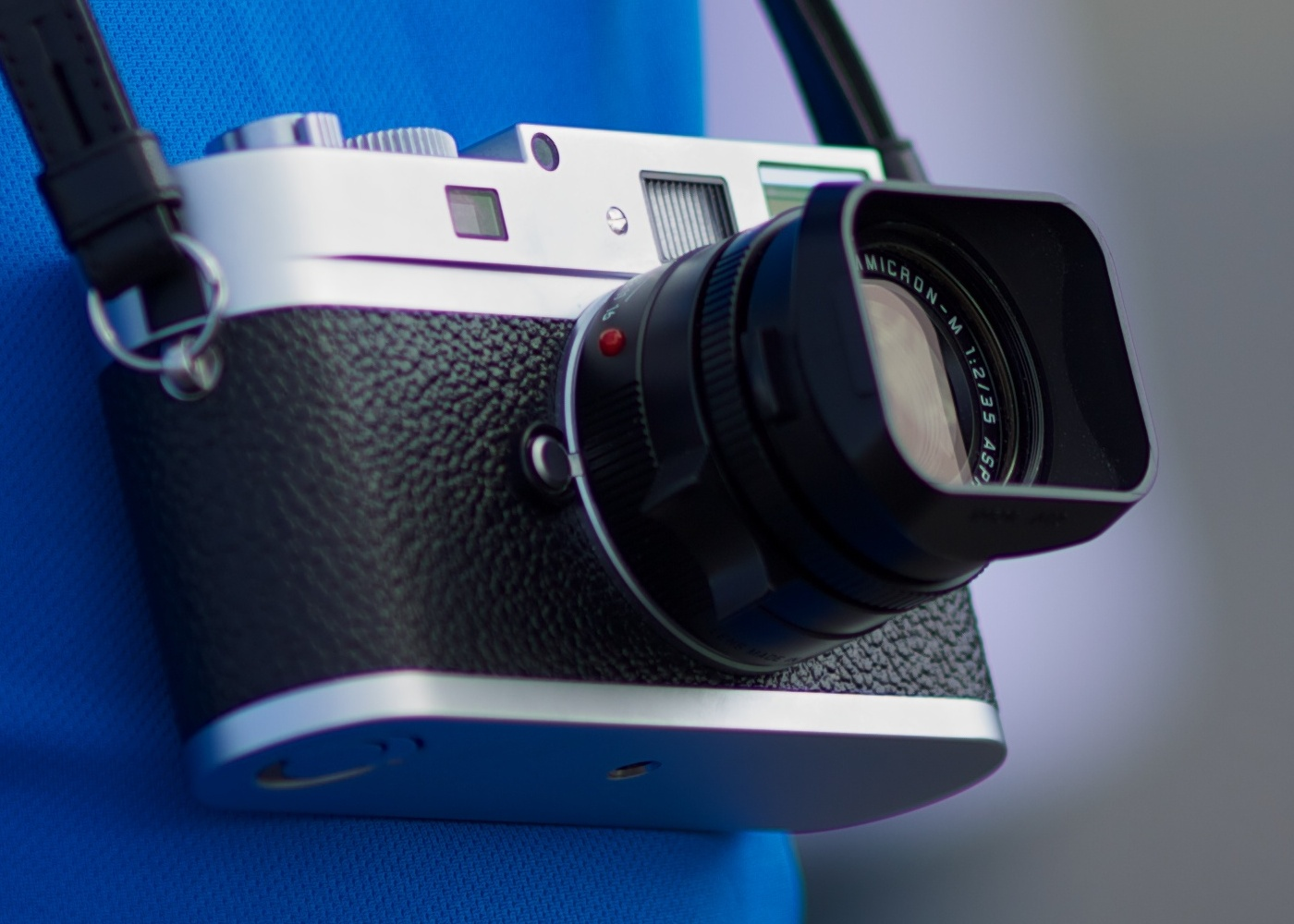
Leica M9-P in silver

== See also ==
- List of retro-style digital cameras

Type		2006	2007	2008	2009	2010	2011	2012	2013	2014	2015	2016	2017	2018	2019	2020	2021	2022
Leica	M		M8			M9/ M9-P			M (240)/ M-P (240)				M10/ M10-P					M11
Leica	ME								M-E (220)			M (262)				M-E (240)		
Leica	MM								MM			MM (246)				M10M		
Leica	MD												M-D (262)		M10-D			
Leica	MR																M10-R	
Non-Leica		Epson R-D1 • Zenit M																
