= Leica M10-D =

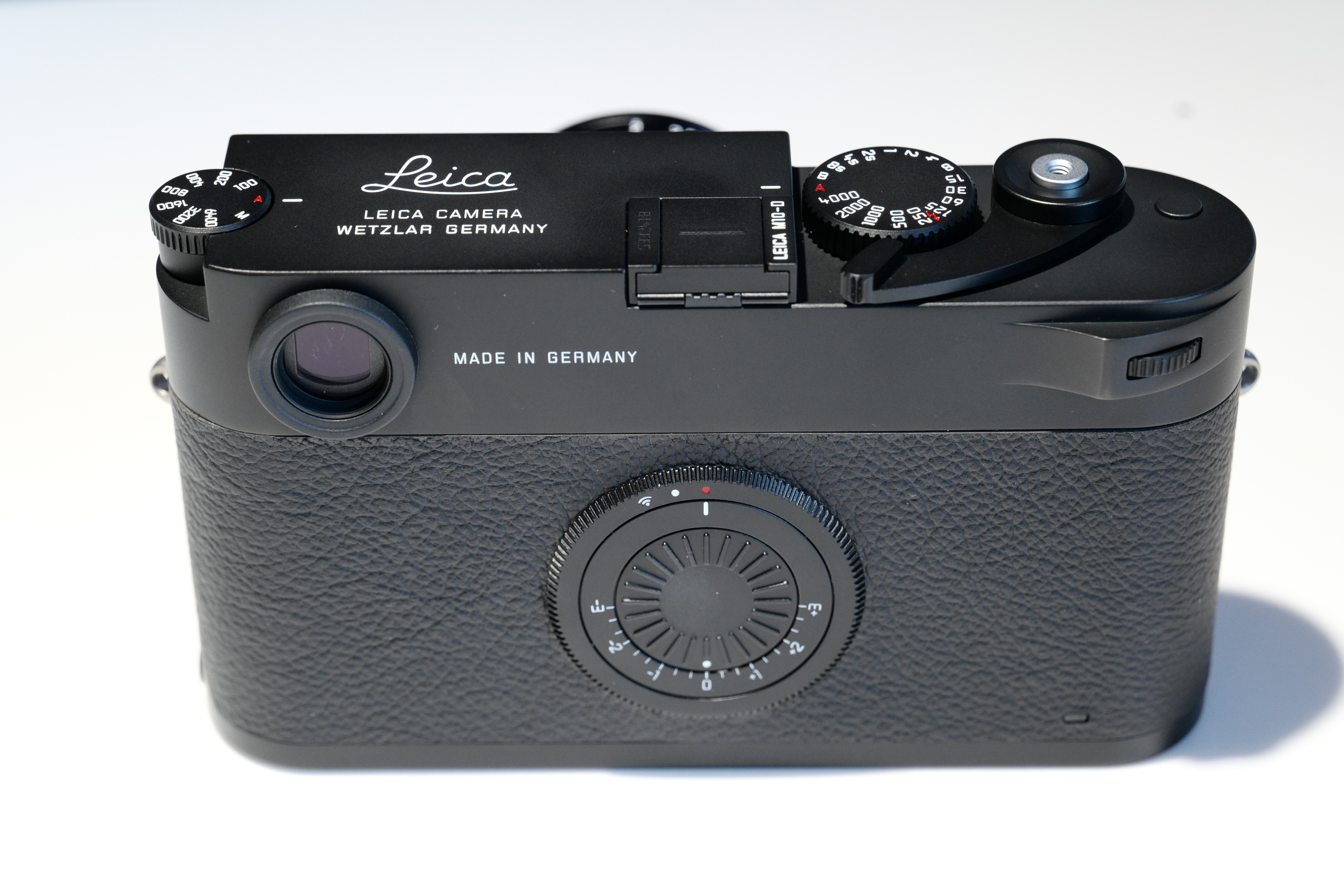

Lens
- Lens mount: Leica M-mount

Sensor/medium
- Sensor type: CMOS
- Sensor size: 23.9 x 35.8 mm
- Sensor maker: Maestro II
- Maximum resolution: 5952 x 3992 pixels (24 MP)
- Film size: ISO 100 to ISO 50000
- Recording medium: SD / SDHC / SDXC

Shutter
- Shutter: 8 s to 1/4000 s

Viewfinder
- Viewfinder: Large, bright, combined bright-line viewfinder with automatic parallax compensation
- Viewfinder magnification: 0.73 x

General
- LCD screen: No LCD screen
- Battery: 1 lithium ion rechargeable battery, nominal voltage 7.4V
- Dimensions: 139×38×80 mm (5.5×1.5×3.1 in) (5.47 * 1.5 * 3.15″)
- Weight: 660 g (24 oz) (with battery)
- Made in: Germany

Chronology
- Predecessor: Leica M-D (Typ 262)

The Leica M10-D is a digital rangefinder camera released by Leica Camera on 24 October 2018. The M10-D succeeds the Leica M-D (Typ 262) in the Leica no-LCD screen line of digital cameras. Otherwise the M10-D is similar to the Leica M10.

In comparison with the M10, instead of the rear screen, the back contains an exposure compensation dial in black. Unlike the M-D (Typ 262), the M10-D has a dedicated ISO dial on the top plate. The M10-D also has a film advance lever, which functions only as a stylised thumb rest.

Other than the exposure, ISO, aperture and shutter speed settings, all other settings must be made via the Leica Fotos app. The app allows the camera to connect with a smartphone via Wi-Fi.

The M10-D has a 24 MP sensor and Maestro II processor. It offers an ISO of up to 50000 and a 5 frames per second burst rate.

The camera retailed for around $8,000 (USD) at its release.

Type		2006	2007	2008	2009	2010	2011	2012	2013	2014	2015	2016	2017	2018	2019	2020	2021	2022
Leica	M		M8			M9/ M9-P			M (240)/ M-P (240)				M10/ M10-P					M11
Leica	ME								M-E (220)			M (262)				M-E (240)		
Leica	MM								MM			MM (246)				M10M		
Leica	MD												M-D (262)		M10-D			
Leica	MR																M10-R	
Non-Leica		Epson R-D1; Zenit M																
