= List of Leica Camera models =

This is a list of Leica Camera models.

== Early models ==
- Leica I: was first introduced to the market at the 1925 spring fair in Leipzig, based on the Ur-Leica prototype developed by Barnack in 1913 and Prototyp 1 developed in 1923. Followed by Leica Luxur and Leica Compur (a total of 60,586 of the Leica I, Luxur, and Compur models were made). Interchangeable lenses for these were introduced in 1930.
- Leica Standard: 1932. The first Leica camera was designed with a film-to-lens flange distance of 28.8 millimeters.
- Leica II: 1932. The first Leica camera with a rangefinder.
- Leica III: 1933. Leica incorporated slow shutter speeds on this model.

== M-series rangefinder ==
M (rangefinder) series The "M" within the nomenclature of this series of cameras comes from the first initial of "Meßsucher" (or "Messsucher"), which is the German word for "Rangefinder".

- M3 – 1954–1967 (Total 200,000 units manufactured) Introduced at the German photokina exhibition in 1954, the M3 was the first of the M series Leicas, a line that is still manufactured today, and featured the first Leica body with a bayonet-style mount for interchangeable lenses. In an advertisement from 1956, it was regarded as a "lifetime investment in perfect photography". The M3 has a .92 magnification finder, the highest of any M camera made. The price of this high magnification was that a 35 mm lens required "goggles" that fit in front of the view/rangefinder windows to facilitate a wider view. The M3 advanced film via a lever rather than a knob, the first M3s required two strokes to advance the film, after 1958 M3's were single stroke. Early M3s lacked a frame preview selector lever to switch between frame lines.
- MP – 1956–57 (Total of 402 sets were manufactured). The original MP was based on the M3 and could be fitted with a Leicavit trigger winding device. MP originally stood for "M Professional"; it was intended as a photojournalist's camera.
- M2 – 1958–1967 (88,000 sets were manufactured). A scaled-down and lower-cost version of the M3, the M2 had a simplified rangefinder of 0.72 magnification, allowing easier use of 35 mm lenses. The 0.72 magnification became the standard viewfinder magnification for future M cameras. The M2 lacked the self-resetting film frame counter of its predecessor.
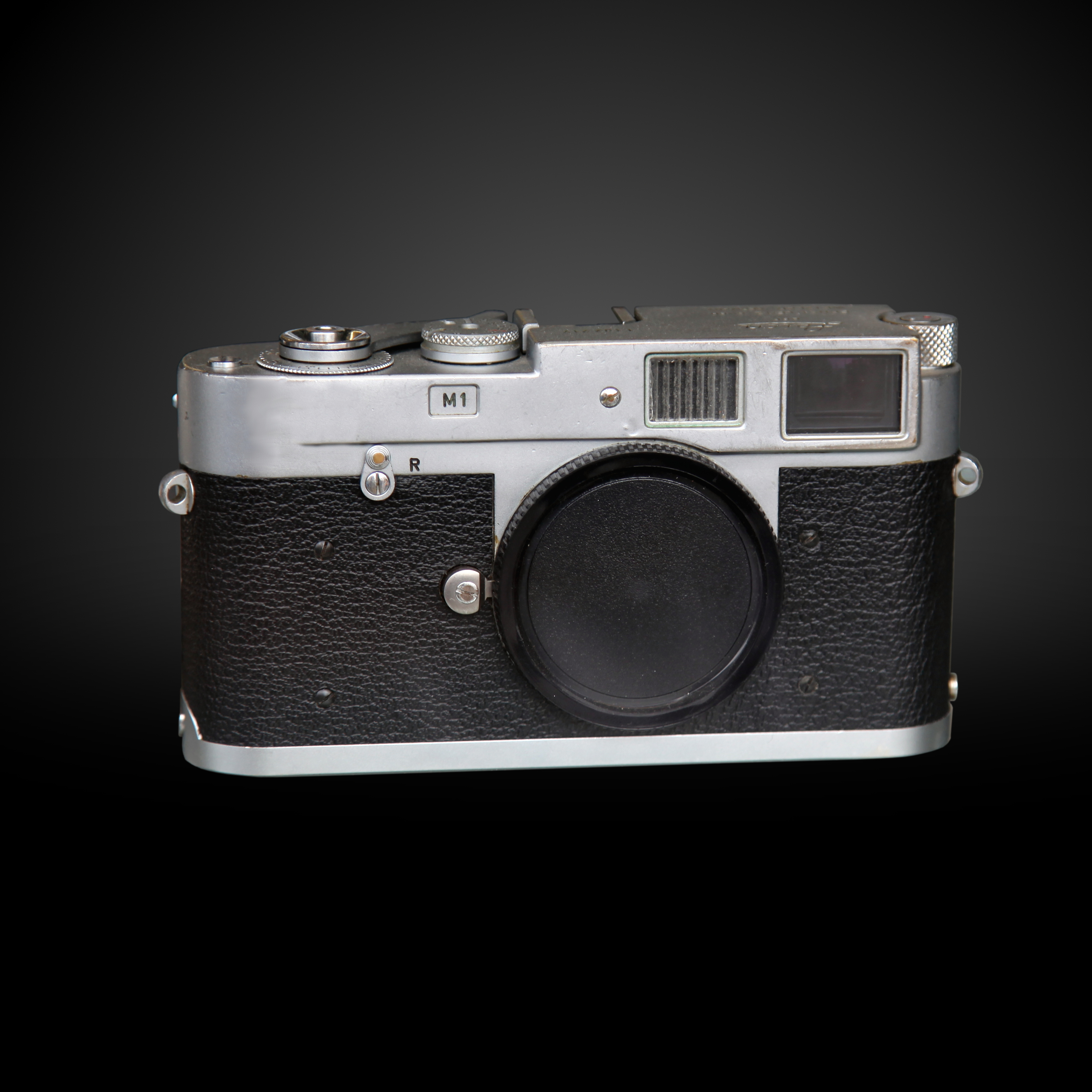
- Leica M1
  M1 – 1959–1964 (9,392 sets were manufactured). A stripped-down version of the M2 for scientific/technical use, the M1 was a viewfinder camera with no built-in rangefinder. Replaced in 1965 by the MD (with no viewfinder at all), and the MDa (based on the M4) (1967), and finally the MD-2 (based on the M4-2) (1980).
- M4 – 1967–1975 (50,000 sets were manufactured); 1974–75 (6,500 sets were manufactured). With added rangefinder frame lines for 35mm and 135mm lenses. Introduced the canted rewind crank (the previous Ms had rewind knobs).
- M5 – 1971–1975 (31,400 sets were manufactured). With added integral TTL light meter. First Leica with a light meter, a mechanical swinging-arm CDS cell positioned behind the lens. The added functionality required a redesigned, larger body compared with the traditional M3 dimensions. Certain wide-angle lenses (early 21 mm f4.0 and f3.4) could not be used in the camera without modification because of the possibility of damage to the rear element of the lens or the meter arm. For similar reasons, collapsible lenses could not be collapsed on the M5. These restrictions also held true for the Leica CL (below). With the M4, the last M-series camera to have a self-timer.
- CL – 1973–1976 (the compact Leica). Leitz Minolta CL introduced two lenses special to that model: the 40mm Summicron-C f2 and 90mm Elmar-C f4. Internal metering is similar to the M5 – CDS cell on a swinging stalk. The CL is also notable for being the only M-bayonet camera to have a vertically travelling shutter. Minolta later manufactured and sold an improved electronic version, the Minolta CLE with Auto Exposure, Off-The-Film TTL metering and TTL Flash metering, together with three M-Rokkor lenses, the 40mm /f2, 28mm/f2.,8 and 90mm/f4.
- M4-2 – 1977–1980 (17,000 sets were manufactured). First M manufactured since 1975, with stronger gears to support a motor drive. It was the first M with a hot shoe for electronic flash. No self-timer. Made in Canada.
- M4-P – 1980–1986. Added rangefinder frame lines for the 28mm and 75mm lenses.

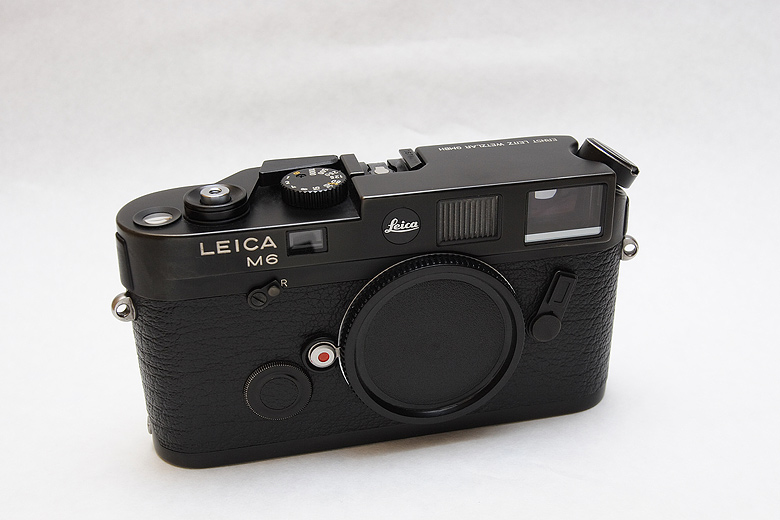
Leica M6 Black Chrome

- M6 "Classic" – 1984–1998. A camera that first combined the M3 form factor with a modern, off-the-shutter light meter with no moving parts and LED arrows in the viewfinder. Informally referred to as the M6 "Classic" to distinguish it from the "M6 TTL" models, and to indicate its "Classic" M3 dimensions.
- M6J – 1994. A collector's edition of 1,640 cameras to celebrate the 40th anniversary of the Leica M System. Notable for its introduction of the 0.85 magnification finder, the first high-magnification finder since 1966, and the basis for the 0.85 cameras to follow starting in 1998.
- M6 0.85 – 1998. The M6 could be optionally ordered with a .85 magnification viewfinder for easier focusing with long lenses and more accurate focusing with fast lenses, such as the 50mm/f1.0 Noctilux and 75mm/f1.4 Summilux. The 28mm framelines are dropped in this model. 3,130 of these cameras were made (all black chrome), so they are among the rarer non-commemorative M6's.
- M6 TTL – 1998–2002. With .72 and .85 viewfinder versions. In 2000 the .58 viewfinder camera for eyeglass wearers are added to the line. Supported TTL flash. The added electronics added 2mm of height to the top plate, and the shutter dial was reversed from previous models (traditionally, turning clockwise increased shutter speed).
- M7 – 2002–2018. Has TTL exposure, aperture priority and manual exposure, an electronic shutter, and two mechanical speeds of 1/60 and 1/125. Comes in .58, .72, and .85 viewfinder formats, each with different brightline frame lines. Same taller top plate and counterclockwise shutter dial as the M6 TTL. Leica even produced an M7 made of solid titanium and offered it in a kit with 1 or several titanium-colored lenses.
- MP – 2003 – current model (as of 2020). 35 mm film. A homage to the original MP, the new MP (this time standing for "Mechanical Perfection") cosmetically resembles the original (even down to changing the rewind crank back to a knob) but is functionally closer to the M6 Classic. A notable improvement over the M6 was the modification of the rangefinder to eliminate flare. The Leicavit M is an accessory introduced with the new MP, allowing trigger wind with the right hand at speeds up to 2–2.5 frame/s. The MP is available in chrome and black paint and with viewfinders of .58, .72 and .85 magnification.
- M-A (typ 127) – 2014 – current model (as of 2021). A 35mm film camera with no light meter or other electronic components. It is available in silver chrome or black chrome and has a .72 magnification viewfinder as standard.
- M6 reissue – 2022 – current model (as of 2022). An MP variant with cosmetic changes to closely but not exactly replicate an early production M6. Features brass top and bottom plates, "Leitz" red dot logo, "ERNST LEITZ WETZLAR GERMANY" top plate engraving, M11-type abrasion-resistant black lacquer and leatherette, and "MADE IN GERMANY" embossing on the back. It is available with viewfinder magnification of 0.72.
- à la carte program – 2004 – June 7, 2019. Program to facilitate custom-built combinations of metal finish, leather type, viewfinder magnification, and custom engraving of some current Leica models (e.g., the M-A (typ 127) is not eligible).
- M8 – 2006–2009. The M8 was the first digital M introduced, featuring a 10.3-megapixel sensor. The sensor is a 1.3 crop of standard 35mm film, which gives the M8 an enlarged perspective in comparison to its predecessors.
- M8.2 – 2008–09. A slightly updated edition of the Leica M8, featuring a quieter shutter, sapphire glass LCD screen cover, new leather coatings, etc. Because both the M8 and M8.2 sensors lack an infrared filter, an IR-cut filter in front of the lens is required to render some synthetic material colors correctly.
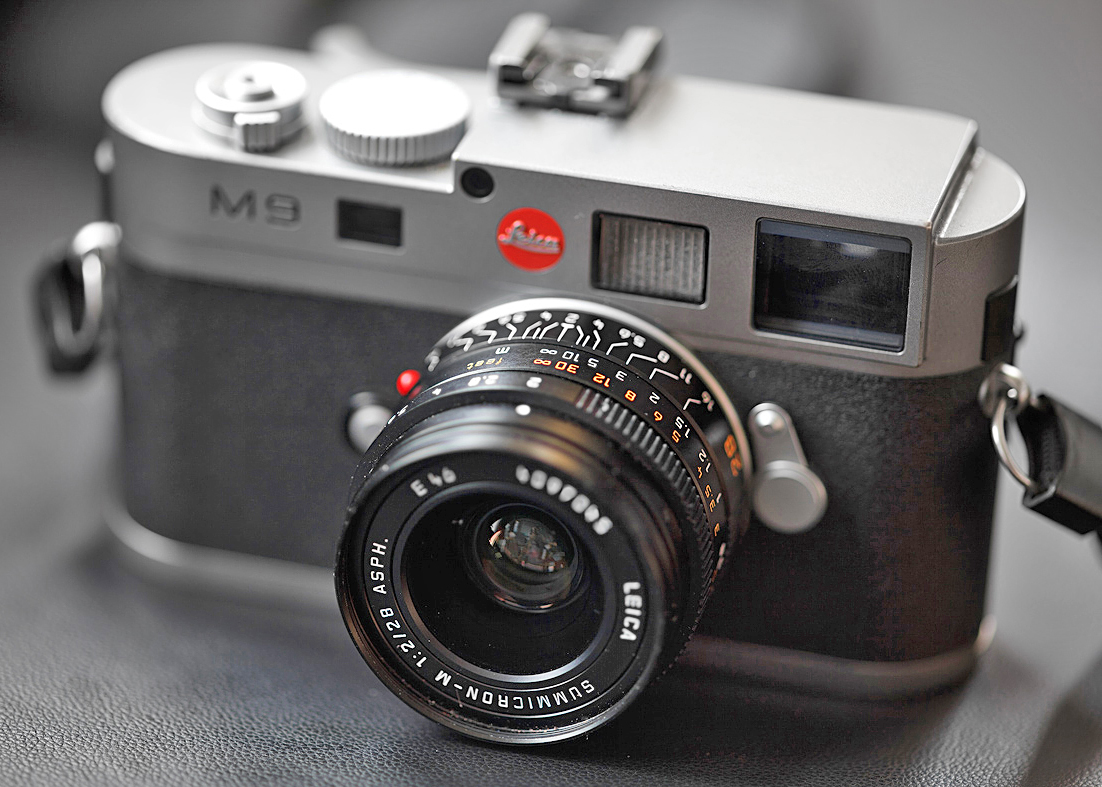
  Leica M9 with a Summicron-M 28/2 ASPH Lens
- M9 – 2009 – The first full frame CCD-sensor digital camera in the series, introduced on September 9, 2009.
- M9-P – 2011 – The full frame digital camera with a classic look, introduced in June/July 2011.
- M Monochrom – 2012 – Announced in May 2012, scheduled for retail sale in July 2012. A version of the M9 that shoots exclusively in monochrome. The sensor lacks both a color filtering array and an anti-aliasing filter.
- M-E (Typ 220) – 2012 – Announced in September 2012, entry-level model in the Leica M full-frame digital camera range.
- Leica M (Typ 240) – 2012 – Announced in September 2012 with full-frame CMOS sensor. The first Leica M digital rangefinder that does "Live View" and can record video in color or black-and-white.
- Leica M-P (Typ 240) – 2014 – Announced in August 2014, 2 GB buffer and sapphire LCD cover.
- Leica M Monochrom (Typ 246) – 2015 – Announced in April 2015, 2 GB buffer and sapphire LCD cover.
- Leica M (Typ 262) – 2015 – Announced in November 2015, no video and live view, aluminum top plate.
- Leica M-D (Typ 262) – 2016 – Announced in April 2016, no back screen.
- Leica M10 – 2017 – Announced in January 2017, the slimmest digital M-camera to date, identical dimensions as the M series film cameras, ISO control knob on the top plate.
- Leica M10-P – 2018 – Announced in August 2018, 24MP compact camera. The M10P has quieter shutter than the M10.
- Leica M10-D – 2018 – Announced in October 2018, no back screen.
- Leica M-E (Typ 240) – 2019 – Announced in June 2019, entry-level model based on the M (Typ 240).
- Leica M10 Monochrom – 2020 – Announced in January 2020, Monochrom version of the M10 with 40 megapixels sensor.
- Leica M10-R – 2020 – Announced in July 2020, High resolution version of the M10 with 40 megapixels sensor.

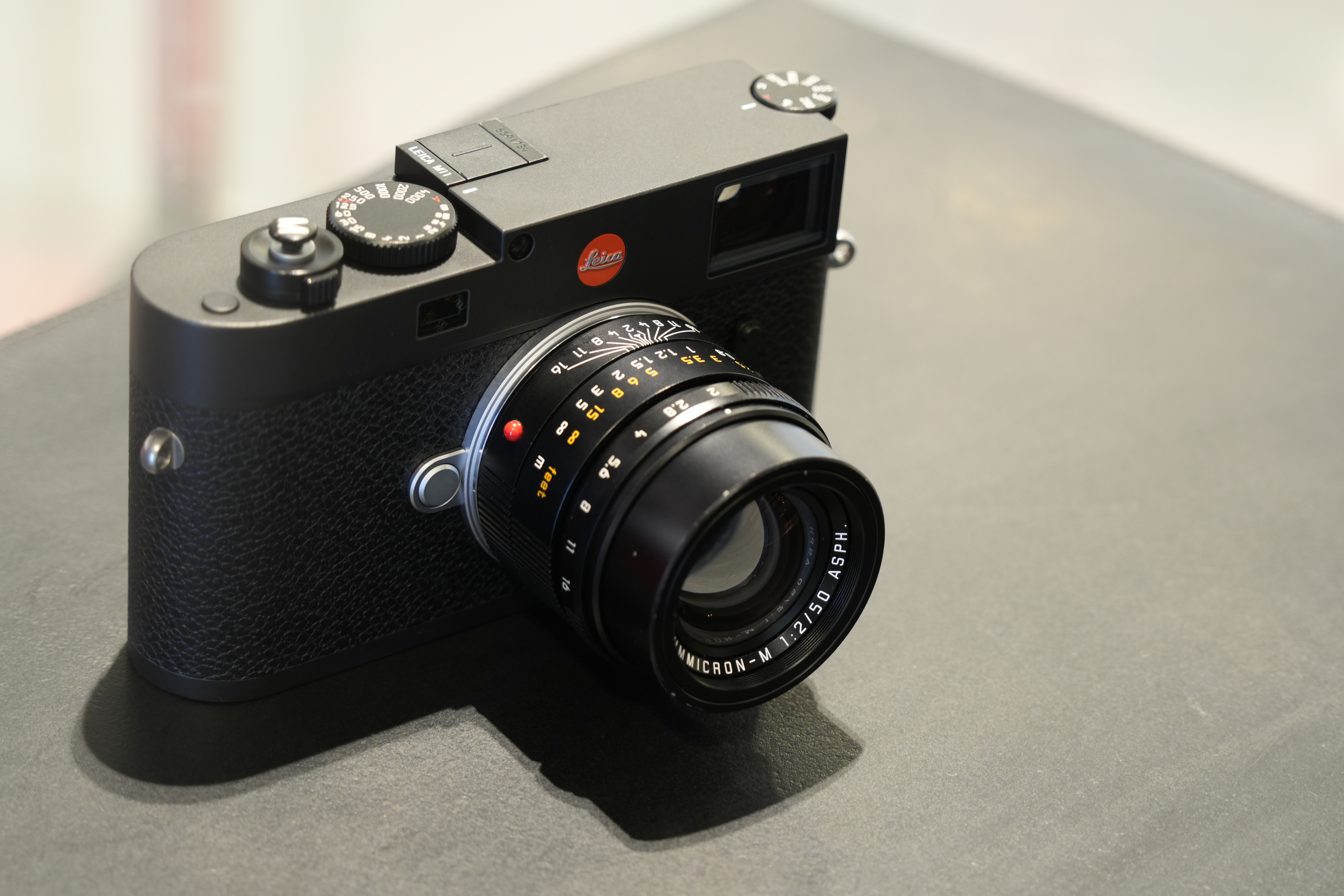
Leica M11

- Leica M11 – 2022 – Announced in January 2022, full-frame BSI CMOS sensor (60 megapixels, 36 megapixels or 18 megapixels).
- Leica M11-P – 2023 – Announced in October 2023. Full-frame BSI CMOS sensor. Introduced metadata provenance management by introducing the Content Authenticity Initiative for protection of artist copyrights and maintaining trustworthiness of images shot on the camera.
- Leica M11-D – 2024 – Announced in September 2024. No rear display.
- Leica M11 Monochrom – 2023 Monochrom Version of M11-P 60megapixel BSI CMOS full frame sensor.
- Leica M EV1 – Announced October 23, 2025, The first Leica M with a built-in electronic viewfinder. The Leica M EV1 introduces a 5.76M dots Oled EVF with a 0.76x magnification, -4 to +2 diopter, eye sensor, and a 60fps refresh rate similar to Leica Q3 and Leica SL3. The EVF allows photographers to fully utilize their M lenses or any adapted optic without any hinderance and is an improvement for people with weak eyesight, just like it offers the possibility to preview exposure and use exotic lenses from all brands on a Leica M EV1.

== Single-lens reflex ==
Leicaflex

Leicaflex is a range of high-end SLR cameras by Leitz created as a reaction to the booming SLR market in East Asia.

- Leicaflex (1964–1968) – Due to the phenomenal success of the Nikon F (1959), Leitz felt a great deal of pressure to introduce a Leica SLR. The first Leicaflex model is sometimes referred to as Standard. It has a built-in external light meter, clear focusing screen with center microprism spot. The Leicaflex Standard is extremely expensive to manufacturer, and so Leitz relied on the sale of the R-Series of lenses to recoup the cost. Leitz is also missing the expertise the Japanese have in the SLR market, and so the Leicaflex was heavily criticized for missing some important features despite its expensive pricing. Only 37,500 units were made during its production run (mostly in standard chrome), while only about 1,000 units came with the black paint. Production ended in 1968.

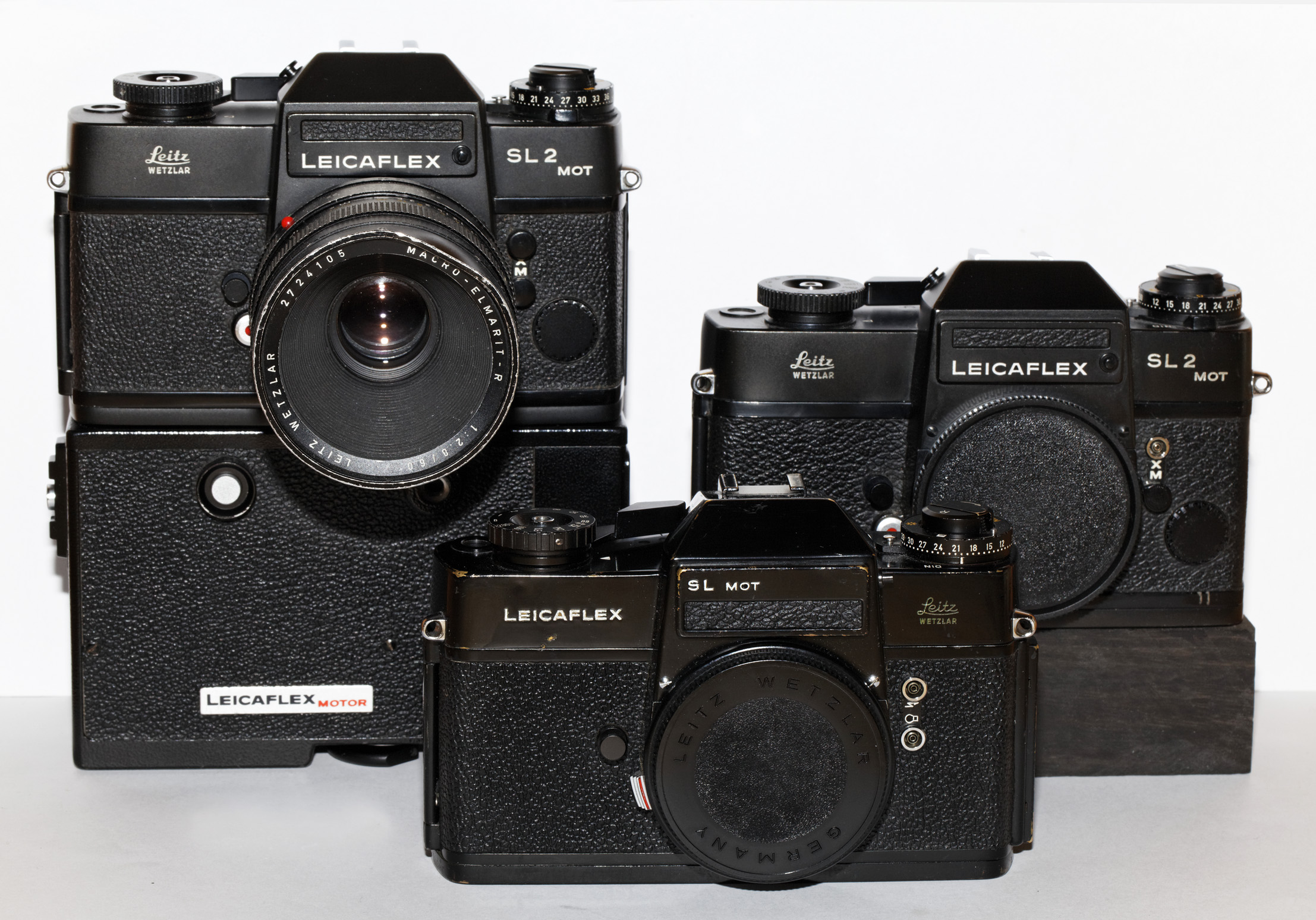
Leicaflex SL family

- Leicaflex SL/SL MOT (1968–1974) – The second Leicaflex model came with an SL moniker which stands for Selective Light. It features a TTL selective-area metering, and a slightly taller body than its predecessor. An SL MOT model was also launched. It is the same Leicaflex SL camera but with support for a large and heavy Leicaflex motor drive. This model sold over 70,000 units, with production ending in 1974.
- Leicaflex SL2/SL2 MOT (1974–1976) – The Leicaflex SL2 is the third and the last Leicaflexes ever made. This model is a refinement of the Leicaflex SL with a more sensitive light meter and improved body shape. This was thought to be one of the toughest SLR ever made despite the cost-cutting measure Leitz made to ensure sustainability. The Leica Solms Museum has an SL2 MOT on display, with a motor drive and a 35mm Summicron lens. The unit is said to have survived a 25,000-foot (7,600 m) fall from a Phantom II fighter jet. It was battered but impressively remained in one piece which deemed repairable by Leica itself. It reportedly cost Leitz more to manufacture than it recouped in sales and motivated the company to collaborate with Minolta for their next series of electronic cameras. The SL2 was also the last mechanical Leica SLR for 14 years. Only about 1,000 SL2 MOTs were made, with the production ending just two years after its launch (the shortest market run for the Leicaflex range).

R series

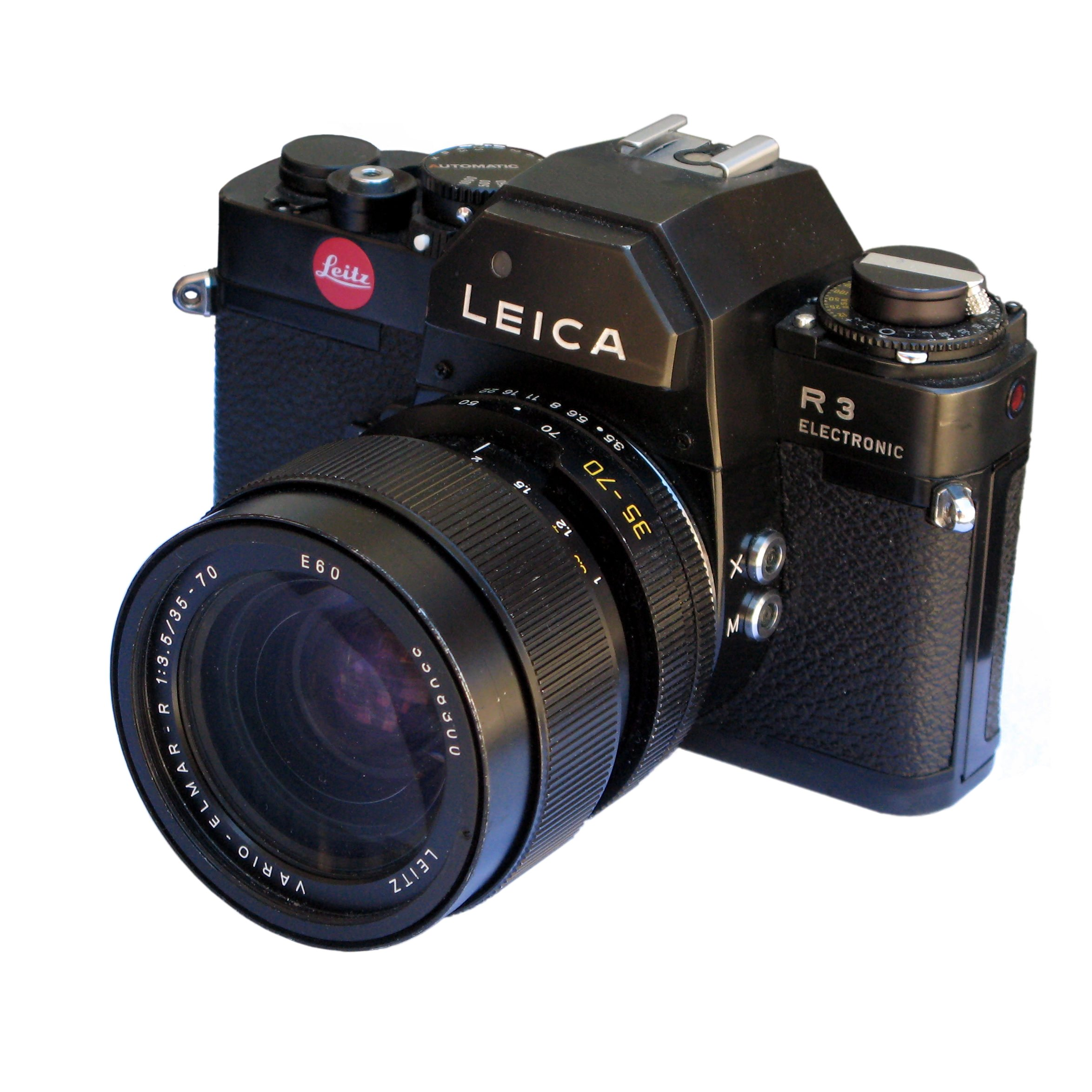
Leica R3

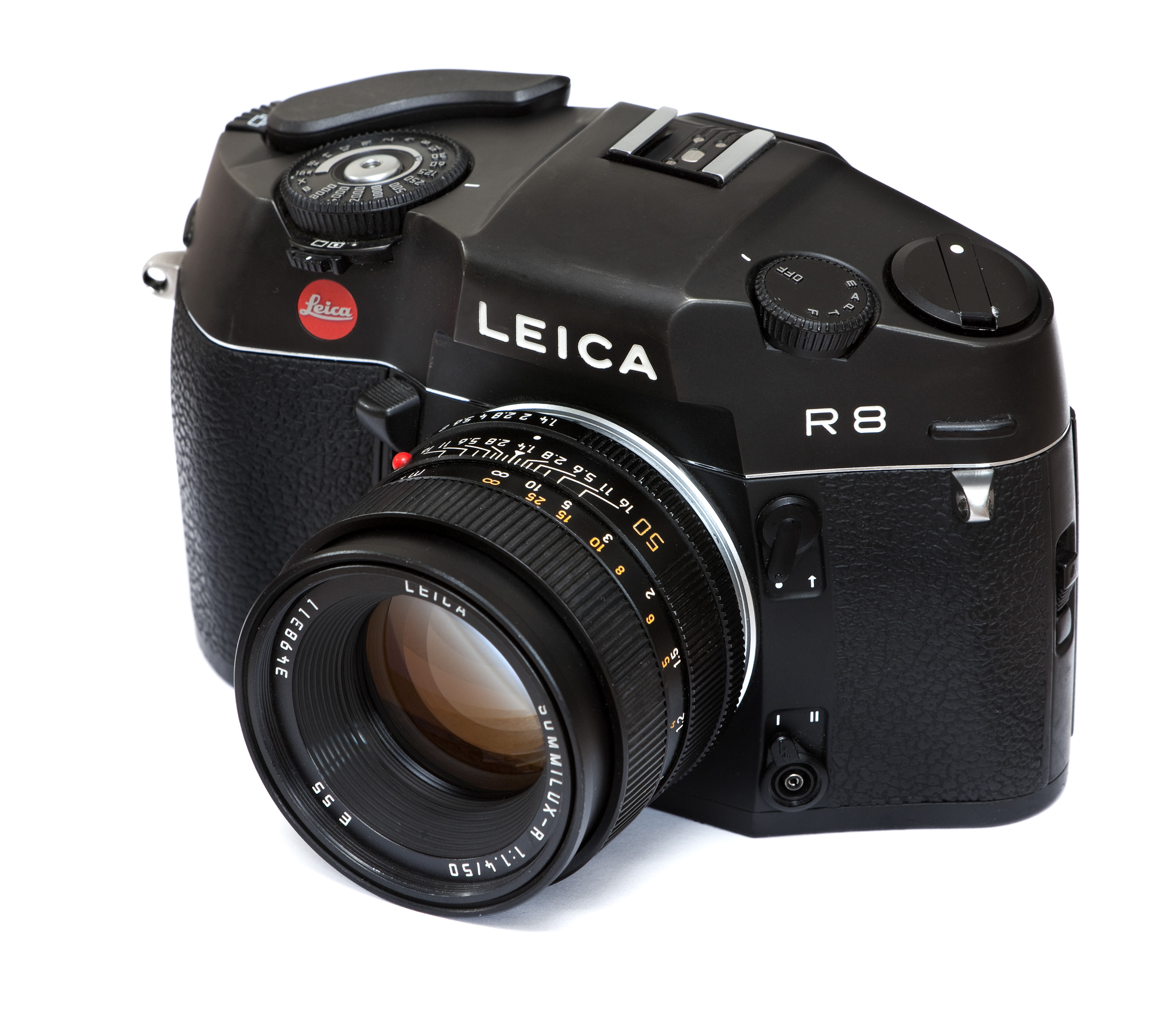
Leica R8

The Leica R SLR is a range of economy and high-end Leica SLRs mostly based on Minolta models.

- Leica R3 (1976) – The Leica R3 is the first electronic Leitz SLR based upon the Minolta XE/Minolta XE-1/XE-7. This is a result of Leica's collaboration with Minolta. The first few were built in Germany and then production was transferred to the Leitz Portugal factory. While the design is mostly Minolta, Leitz made some Leica specific adjustments and upgrade to the unit.
- Leica R4 (1980) – The Leica R4 is a new compact model based upon the Minolta XD-7/Minolta XD-11. The R4 set the design for all cameras up to and including the R7. The R4 offered Program Mode, Aperture and Shutter Priority, and Manual, with Selective and Center-weighted metering. The original R4 MOT differed in designation only; all R4S and up accepted motors and winders. The Leica R4S, R4SP, and R4S Mod2 were simplified Leica R4 models at slightly lower prices. The "S" moniker stands for "Simplified", while the "SP" stands for "Simplified Professional".
- Leica R5 (1987) – The Leica R5 feature revised electronics and had TTL flash capability. Leica also launched a model called the Leica R-E. The Leica R-E was a simplified economy model of the Leica R5 produced between 1990 and 1994. It is basically a Leica R5 without the Program and Shutter Priority mode. Only about 6,000 Leica R-E was ever produced.
- Leica R6 (1988) – The Leica R6 has a mechanical shutter, relied on battery power only for the built-in light meter. A model called the Leica R6.2 was also released.
- Leica R7 (1992) – The Leica R7 added more advanced electronics to the R Series. This is also the last R Series Leica SLR made in collaboration with Minolta.
- Leica R8 (1996) – The Leica R8 features a complete redesign, this time in-house with production relocated back to Germany. All traces of Minolta are gone.
- Leica R9 (2002) – The Leica R9 was an improved version of the Leica R8 with 100g less weight and a new anthracite body finish. This model and its range of lenses were discontinued in 2009. This is the last R Series SLR Leica launched in the market.
  - R8/R9 DMR Digital Module-R – 10-megapixel digital back for the R8/R9, making them the first 35mm SLR cameras able to capture to film or digitally. This unit was discontinued in 2008.
- Leica R10 – While Leica announced in July 2009 that an R10 is forthcoming, so far one has not been released, and is unlikely given previous announcements from Leica.

Leica also makes a line of cine lenses used for cinematic projects. In February 2015, their design team was awarded an Academy Scientific and Engineering Award for the optical and mechanical design of the Leica Summilux-C lenses.

== SL-series (full-frame sensor) ==
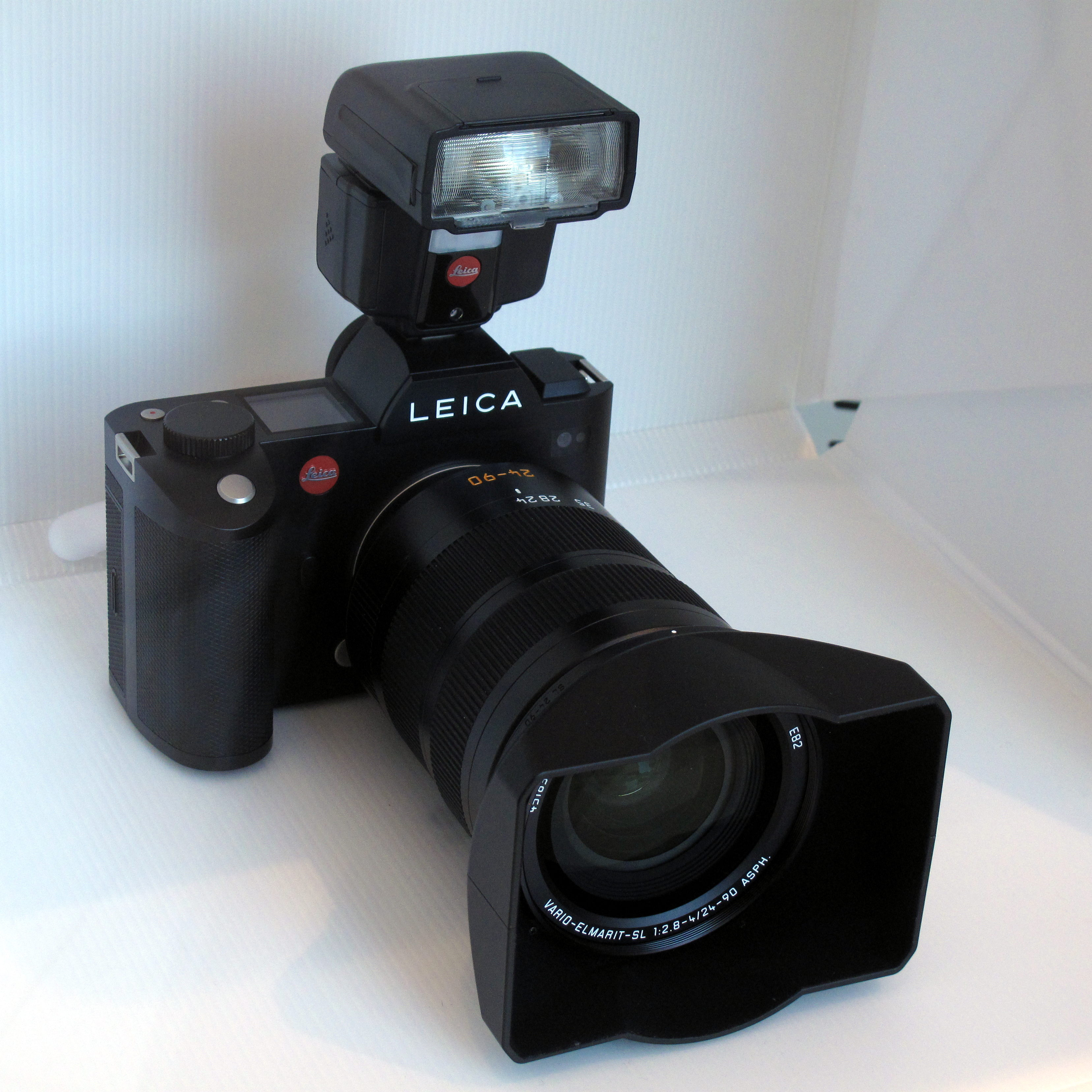
Leica SL (Typ 601)

- Leica SL (Typ 601) is a full frame 35 mm format mirrorless system camera announced by Leica on October 20, 2015. The Leica SL is promoted as a camera system for professional applications. Beside the Leica S-System, the Leica SL-System is the second professional camera in the company's product portfolio.
- Leica SL2 (2019) – The Leica SL2 features a 47 MP CMOS sensor combined with sensor-based body image stabilization. Other improvements include a larger LCD screen and Maestro III processor.
- Leica SL2-S (2021) – 24 MP CMOS sensor, two separate recording modes for photos and videos.
- Leica SL3 (2024) – The Leica SL3 is lighter and smaller than the preceding SL2, and is equipped with a 60 MP BSI CMOS sensor. Other improvements include a faster Maestro IV processor, a revamped user interface, the ability to record videos in resolutions of up to 8K, and a triple-system autofocus system.

== TL- and CL-series (APS-C sensor with matched lenses) ==
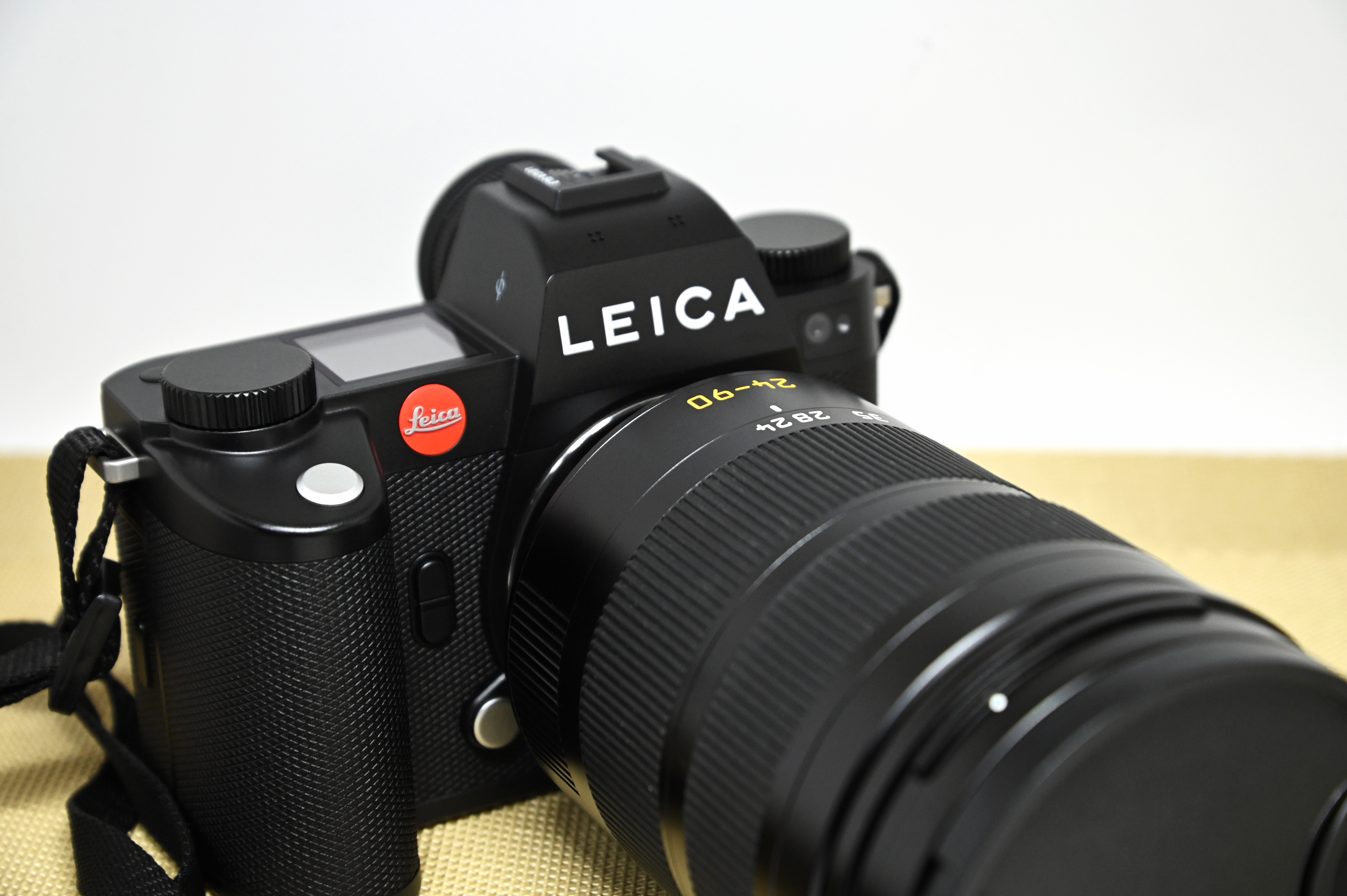
- Leica SL3
  Leica T (Typ 701) – In 2014, Leica announced Leica T (Typ 701), the first camera with a body made completely of aluminum. Initially there were two available lenses for the camera, the Leica Summicron-T 23mm f/2 ASPH and the Leica Vario-Elmar-T 18–56 mm f/3.5–5.6 ASPH. More lenses have been announced for 2015.
- Leica TL – The Leica TL is the successor of the Leica T (Typ 701).
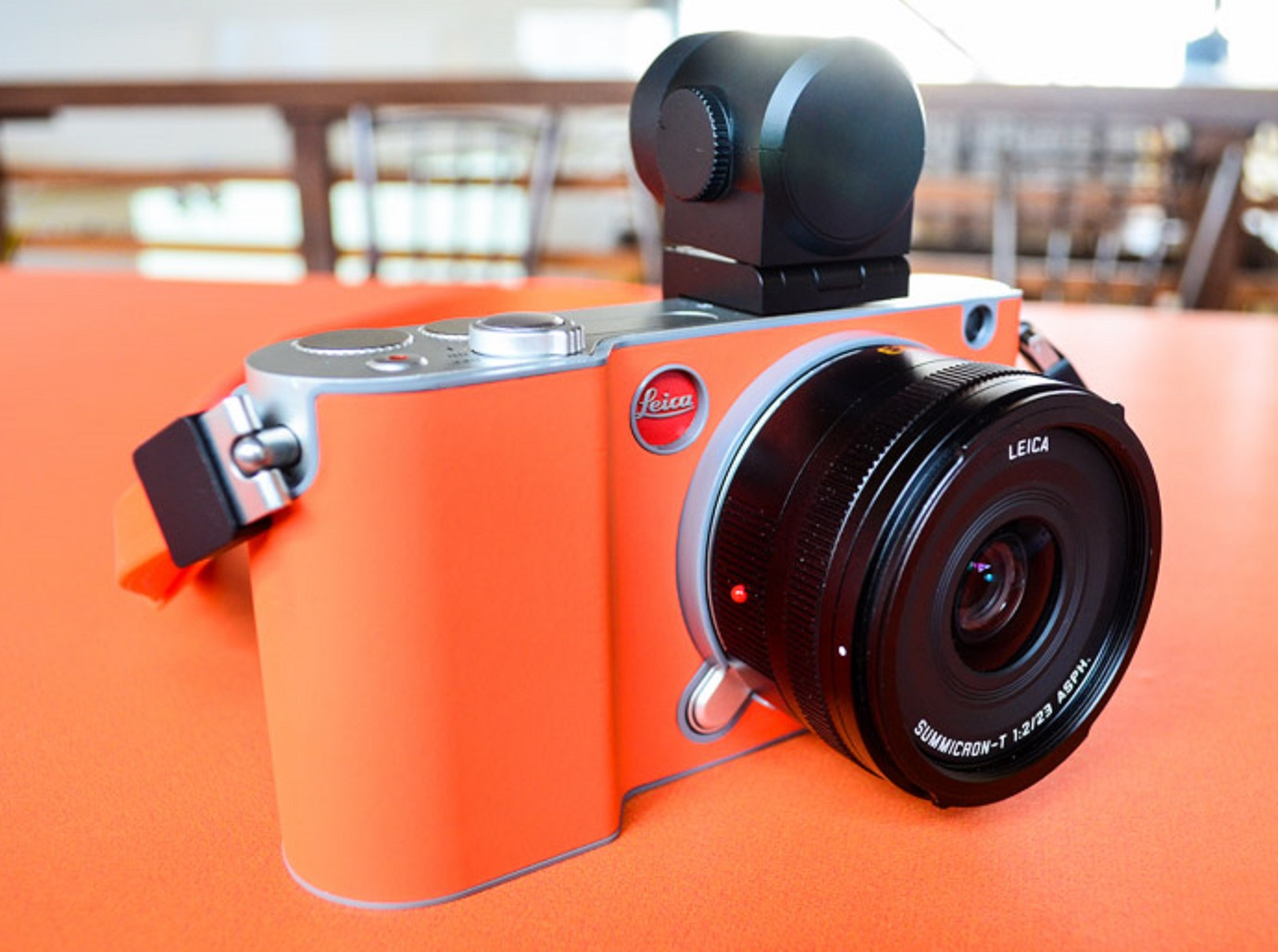

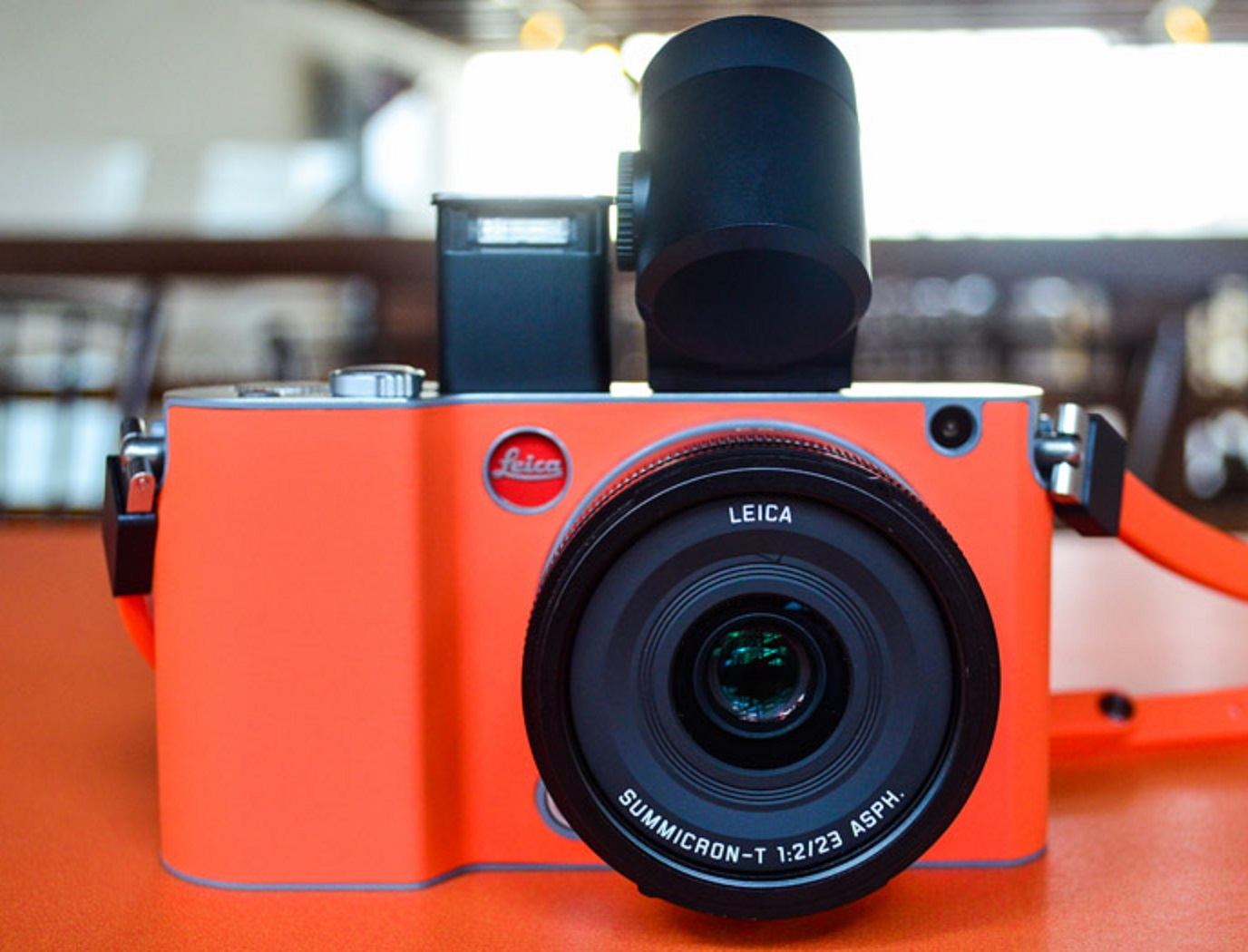

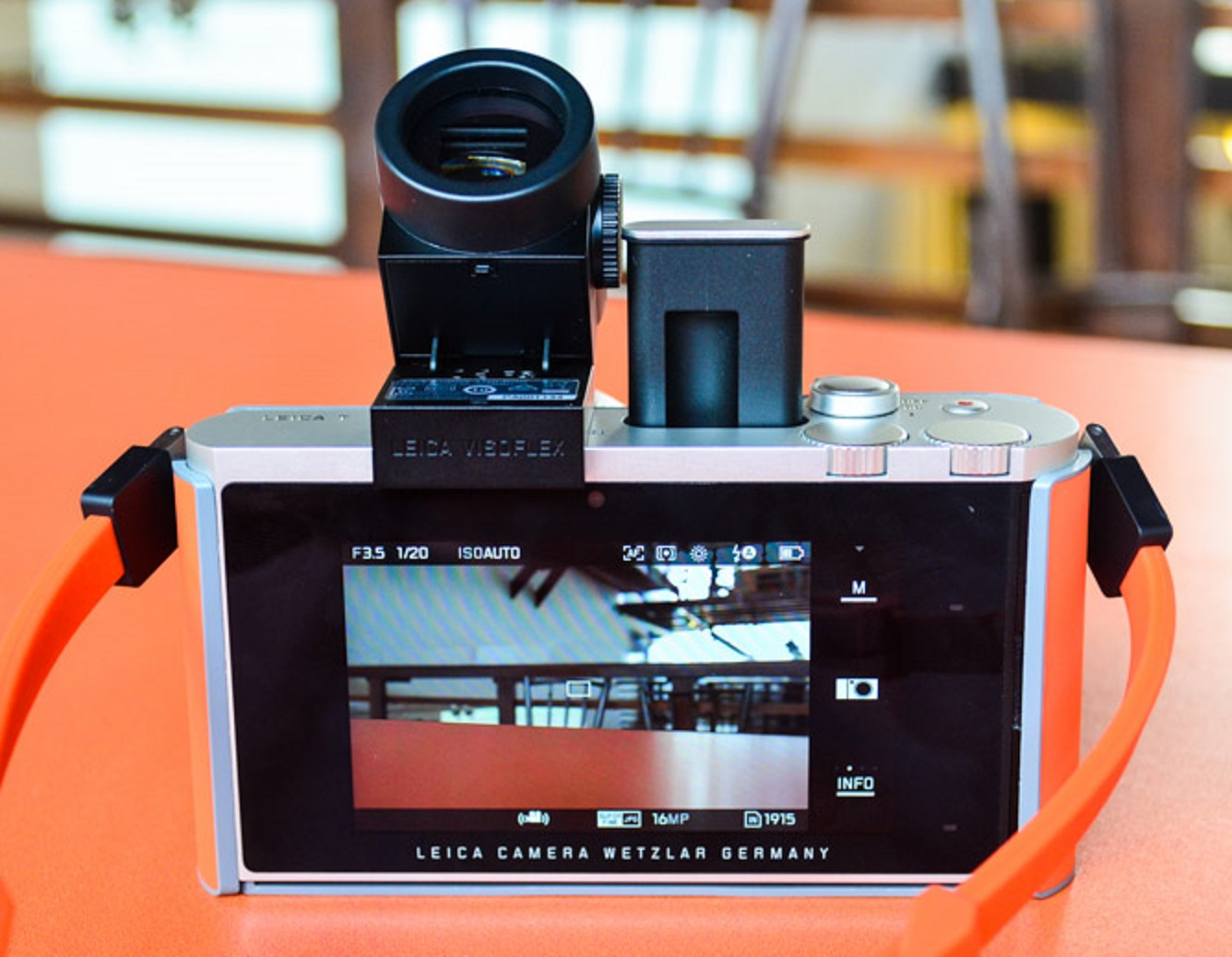

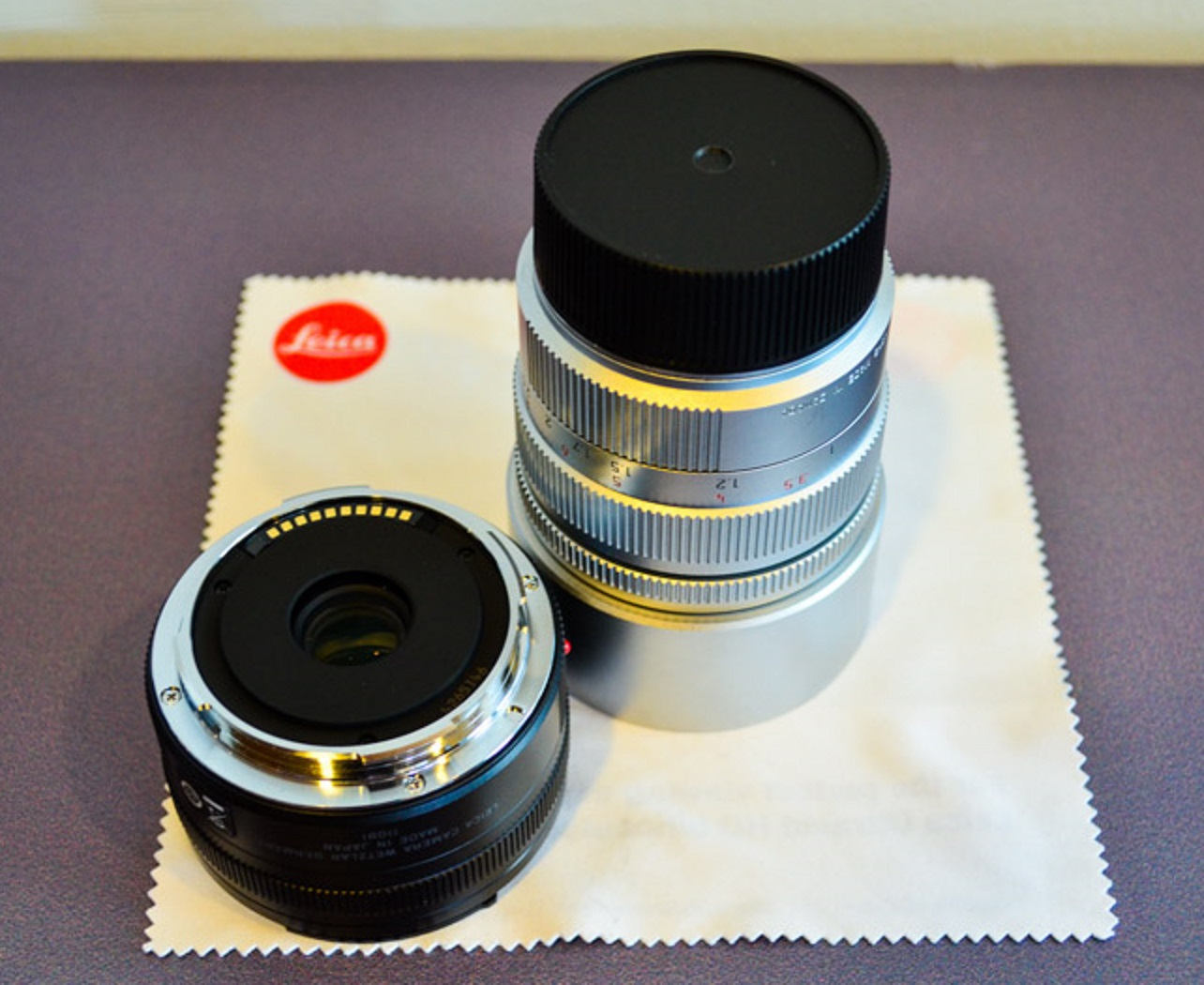
- Leica TL2 – The Leica TL2 is the successor of the Leica TL.
- Leica CL – The camera was introduced November 21, 2017.

Non-Leica (Sigma and Panasonic) Sigma and Panasonic joined forces with Leica to form the L-mount Alliance on 25 September 2018 and license the L-mount system for their own lines of lenses and cameras.

Three forthcoming cameras were announced on the same day as the alliance:

- Panasonic S1 and S1R full-frame cameras for release in early 2019
- As-yet unnamed Sigma full-frame camera using the company's Foveon sensor, also for release in 2019

== S-series reflex (digital medium format) ==
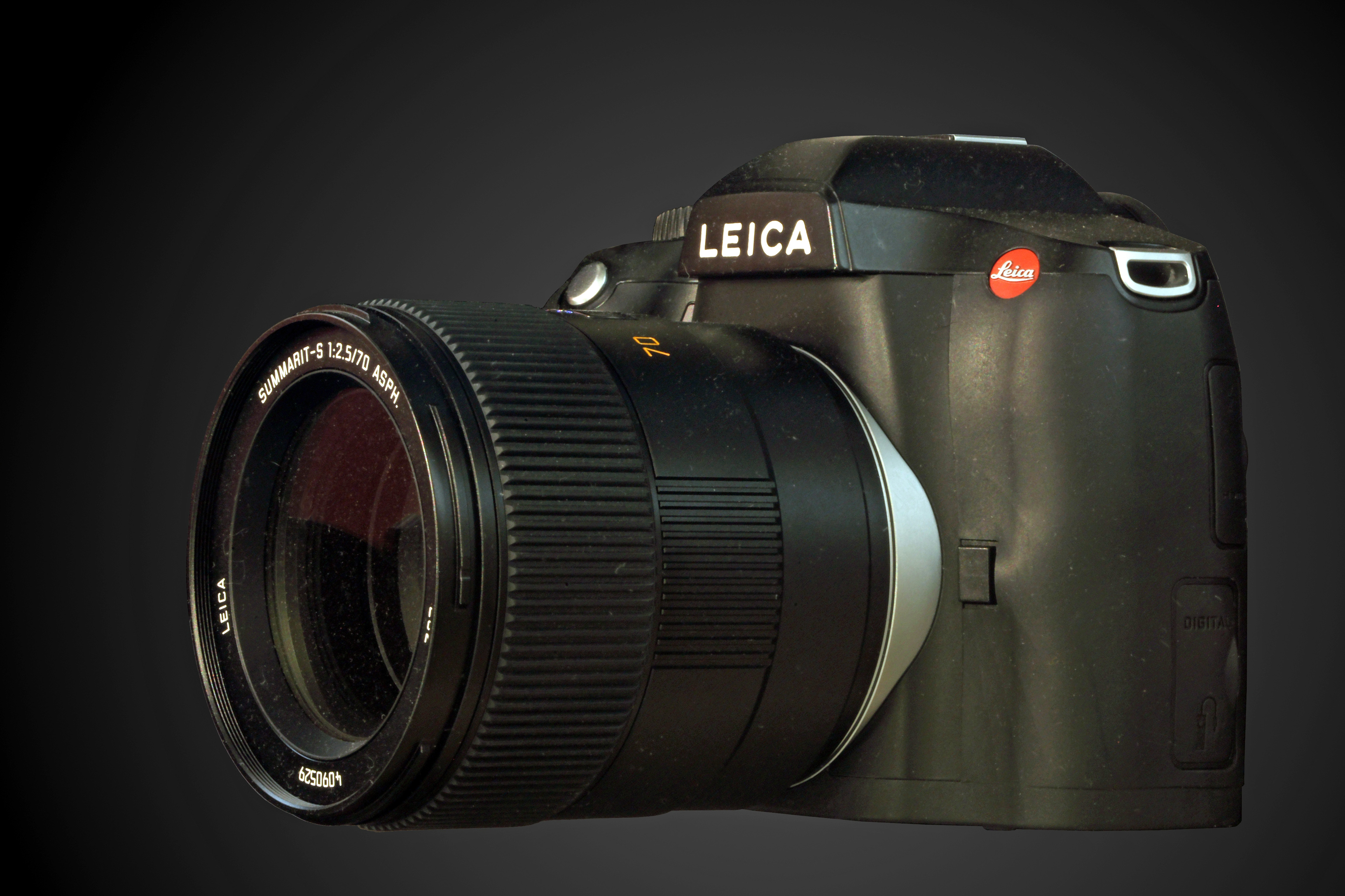
Leica S2

- Leica S1 – The Leica S1 Pro is a scanner camera with a very high resolution (26 megapixels) for stationary use introduced in 1996. On a 36×36 mm sensor 5140×5140 pixels get scanned and optically transferred to a connected computer. The object lens adapter system was exchangeable, thus object lenses of the systems Leica R, Leica M, Hasselblad, Mamiya 4, 5×6, and all mechanic object lenses from Canon (FD), Nikon, etc. can be used with the S1. The software for the S1 is a special SilverFast version, originally developed by LaserSoft Imaging for high-end scanners. Approximately 160 cameras were built and mostly sold to museums, archives and research institutes. Later on Leica introduced the S1 Highspeed with very quick scanning and the S1 Alpha with half the resolution to the market.
- Leica S2 – In 2008, Leica announced plans to offer an S-System – DSLR with a Kodak-made custom CCD image sensor measuring 30×45 mm and containing 37 million pixels. This sensor has a 26% longer diagonal and 56% larger area than a "full-frame″ 24×36 mm DSLR sensor and outputs an approximately 5000x7500 pixel image. The Leica S2 is thus essentially a medium format camera in a "35 mm SLR"-sized body. The new "Maestro" image processor used in the S2 was developed by Fujitsu based on the Milbeaut and the autofocus system (Leica's first to see production) was developed in house. The S2 series body, lenses and accessories were available in 2009. A series of new Leica lenses is manufactured specifically for the S2 and Leica claims they offer unsurpassed resolution and contrast at all apertures and focusing distances, even exceeding the sensor's capabilities. Lenses offered for the S2 include Summarit-S in normal (70mm), wide-angle (35mm), and macro (120mm) varieties, and Tele-Elmar (180 mm) portrait-length telephotos; these are available in versions that feature integrated multi-leaf blade shutters ("Central Shutter", or CS), in addition to the focal-plane shutter in the camera body, to enable higher flash sync speeds.
- Leica S (Typ 006) – Leica announced the Leica S (Typ 006) in September 2012. It replaces the Leica S2, having a new sensor board with improved noise characteristics.
- Leica S (Typ 007) – Leica announced the Leica S (Typ 007) in September 2014. It replaces the Typ 006's CCD with a new CMOS image sensor. It offers improved noise characteristics, stills at 3.5 frames/second, and 4K video.
- Leica S3 – Leica announced the Leica S3 in October 2018. The camera specs were finally released in early 2020, to be available for sale in the spring.

== Q-series full-frame compact cameras ==
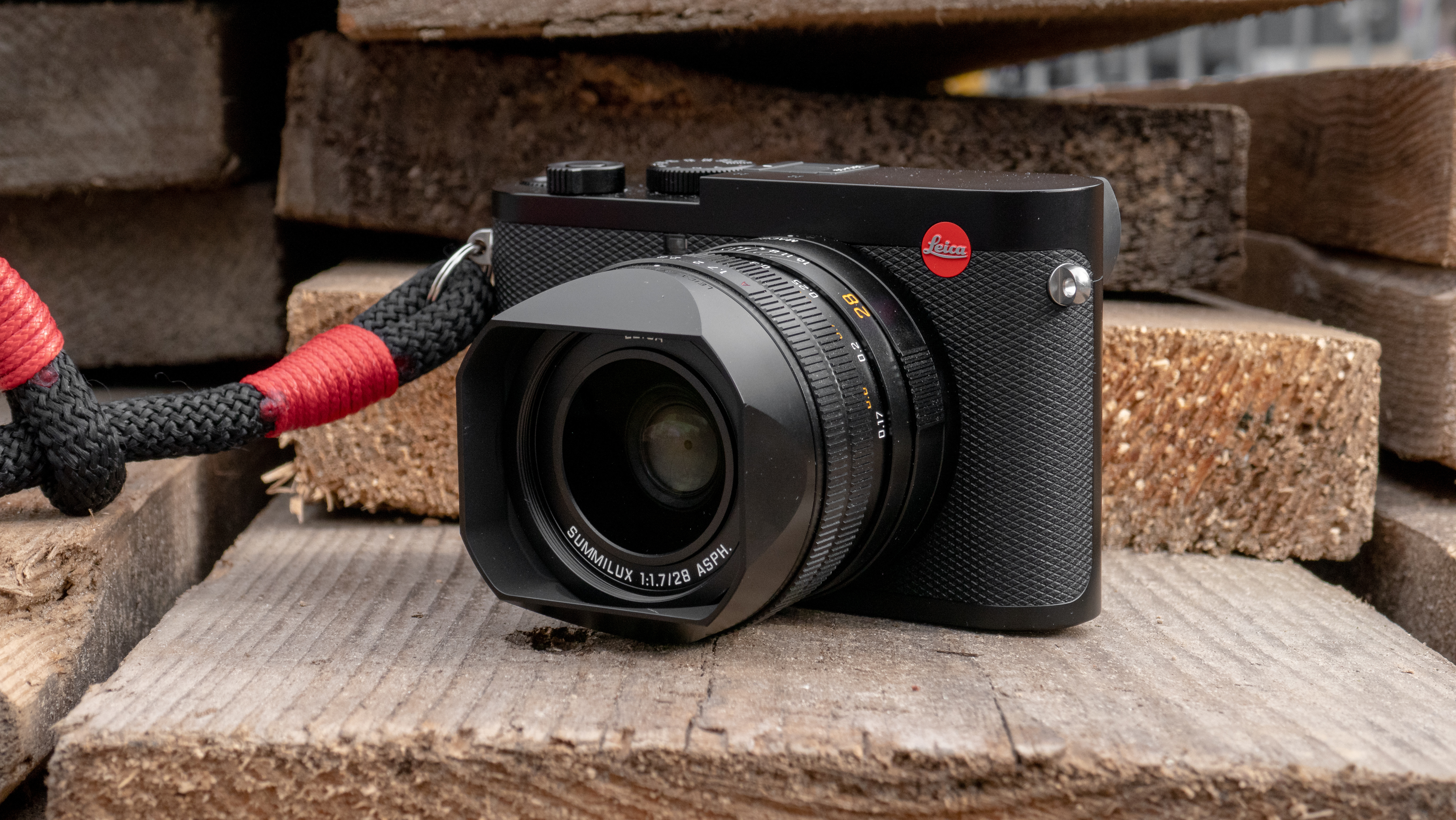
Leica Q2

Leica Q (Type 116) compact full frame camera with a Summilux 28 mm f/1.7 ASPH lens was officially announced on June 10, 2015. Its successor, the Leica Q2 with a 47.3 Megapixel full frame sensor, was launched in March 2019. In November 2020, the company released a monochrome version of the camera, the Q2 Monochrom, using a sensor similar to that in the M10 Monochrom, but with 47.3 megapixels.

The Leica Q3 with the 28mm lens was officially launched on May 25, 2023.

The Leica Q3 43 was launched on September 26, 2024.

== Sofort-series instant cameras ==
Leica Sofort was announced in September 2016 at Photokina. It is Leica's first instant film camera and is compatible with both Leica's own film packs as well as Fuji Instax Mini film. It features a 60mm lens, modes for normal and macro photography and a host of pre-sets for applications like selfies and fast moving sports photography.

== Early digital cameras ==
Digilux-series digital system cameras

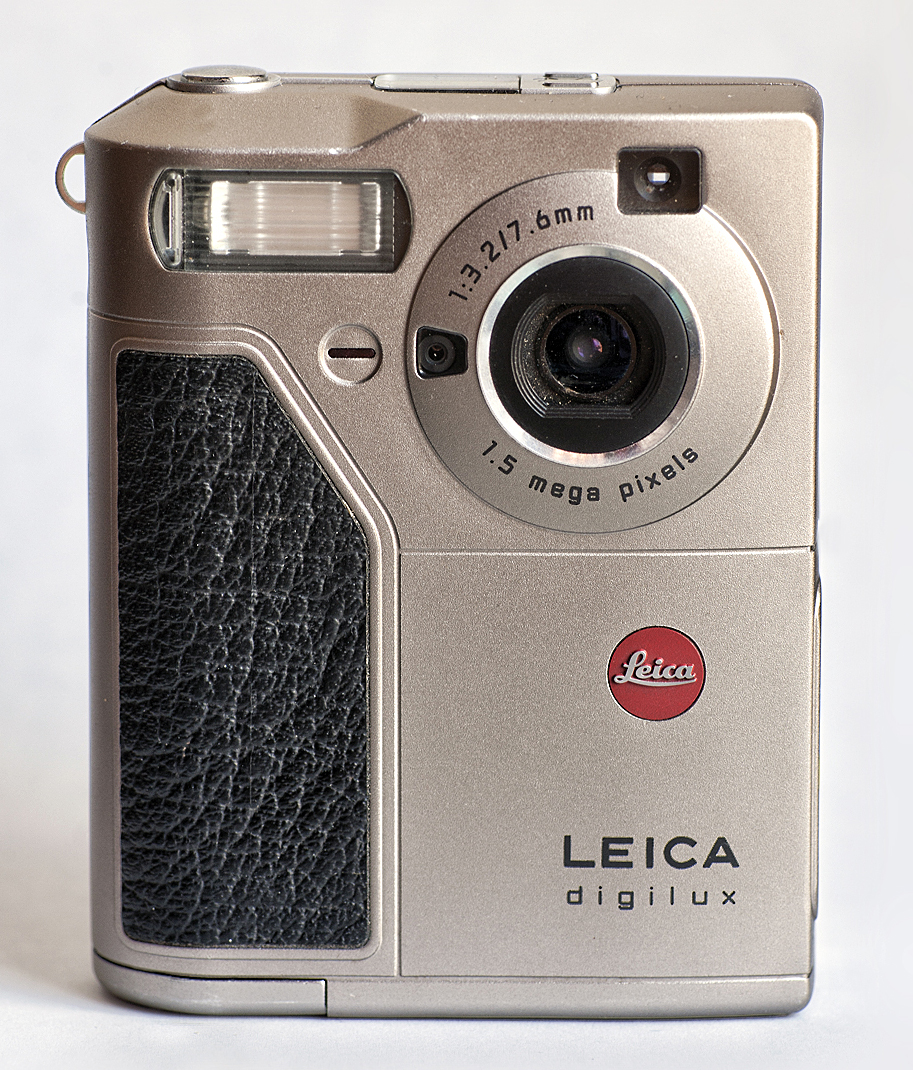
The original Digilux model

- Digilux
- Digilux Zoom
- Digilux 4.3
- Digilux 1
- Digilux 2
- Digilux 3
- R8/R9 DMR Digital Module R (DSLR)

Digital compact camera series

- C-Lux series (year of introduction)
  - C-LUX 1 (2006)
  - C-LUX 2 (2007)
  - C-LUX 3 (2008)
  - C-LUX (2018)
- D-Lux series (year of introduction)
  - D-LUX (2003)
  - D-LUX 2 (2005)
  - D-LUX 3 (2006)
  - D-LUX 4 (2008)
  - D-LUX 5 (2010)
  - D-LUX 6 (2012)
  - D-LUX (Typ 109) (2014)
  - D-LUX 7 (2018)
  - D-LUX 8 (2024)
- V-Lux bridge camera series (year of introduction)
  - V-LUX 1 (2006)
  - V-LUX 20 (2010)
  - V-LUX 2 (2010)
  - V-LUX 30 (2011)
  - V-LUX 3 (2011)
  - V-LUX 40 (2012)
  - V-LUX 4 (2012)
  - V-LUX (Typ 114) (2014)
  - V-LUX 5 (2019)
- X series

Introduced with the Leica X1 on September 9, 2009. APS-C size sensor in a compact body. No viewfinder (hotshoe finder optional), fixed prime lens.

In May 2012, the company introduced its successor, the Leica X2.

In 2013, the Leica X Vario (Typ 107) was announced: a compact body with a 16.2 MP APS-C size sensor, a fixed variable-aperture zoom (F3.5 – F6.4, 28–70 mm equivalent) and no viewfinder (plug-in electronic viewfinder optional).

In 2014, Leica announced two updates on the series: the Leica X-E (Typ 102) featuring a 24 mm f/2.8 lens and the Leica X (Typ 113) which has a 23mm f/1.7 lens.

- C series

On September 8, 2013, Leica announced the Leica C (Typ 112), a compact camera with an electronic viewfinder based on the Panasonic DMC-LF1.

== Compact film cameras ==
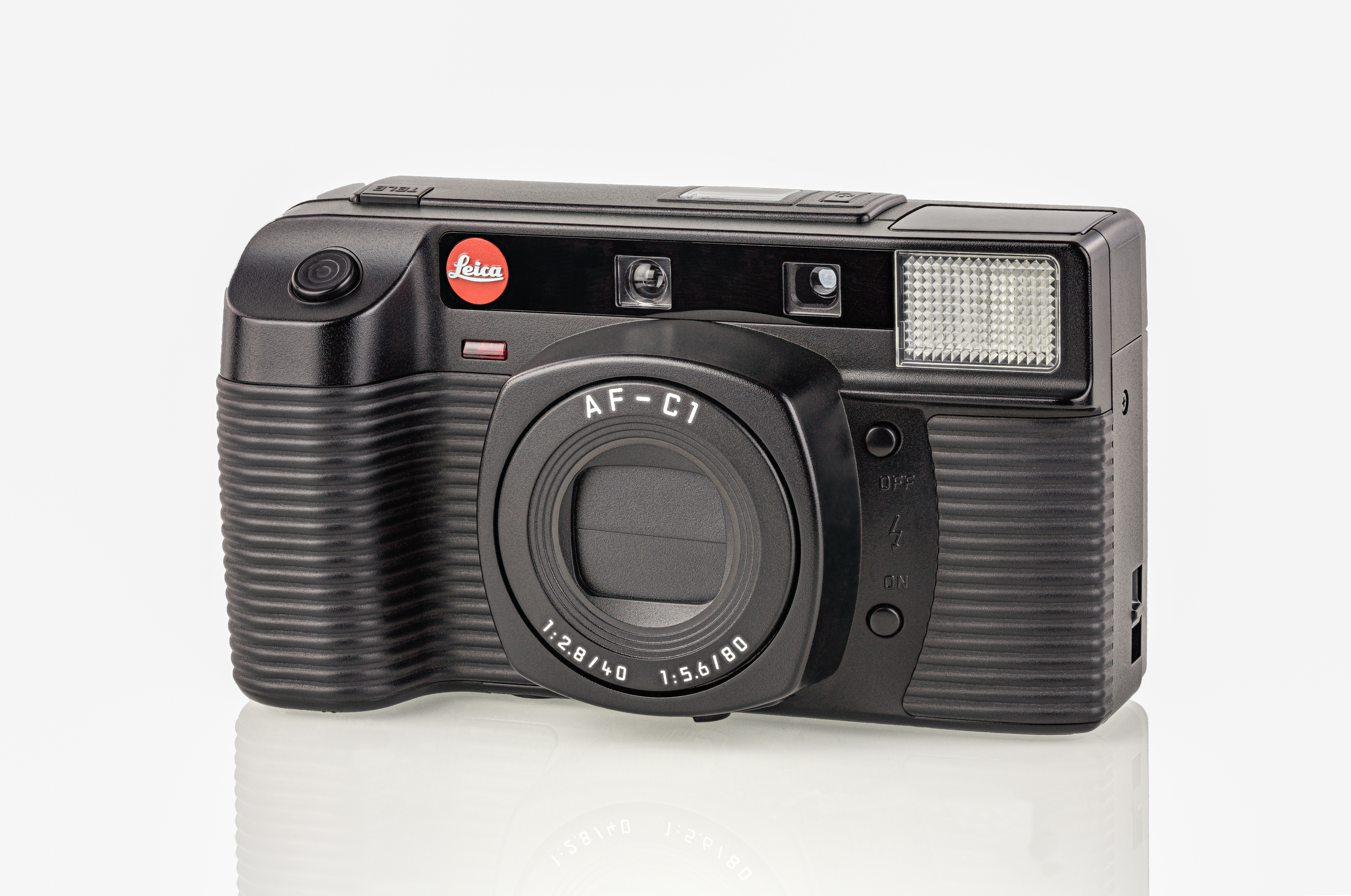
The first Leica compact camera, made by Minolta (1989–1991)

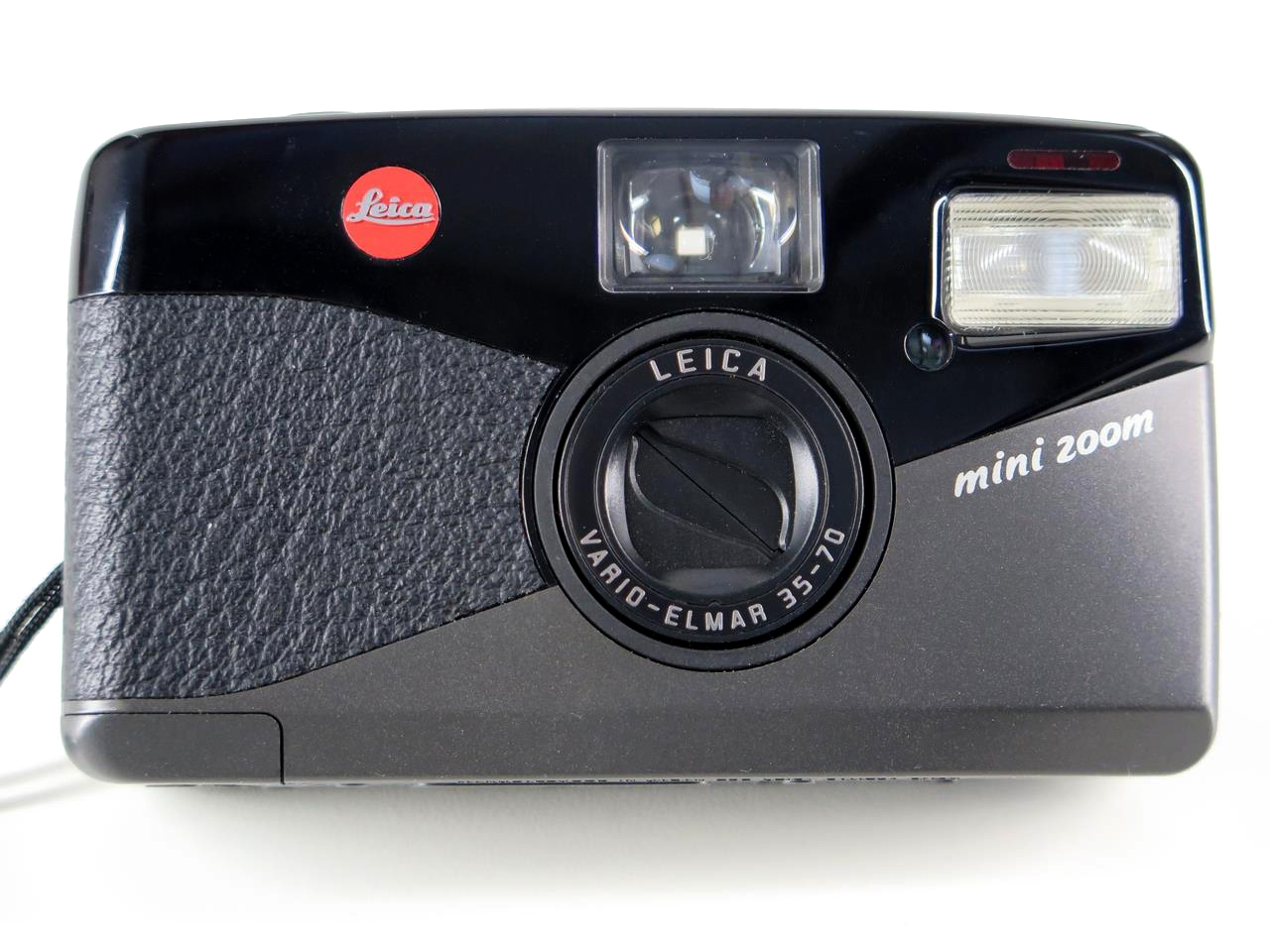
Leica mini Zoom (1993–1997)

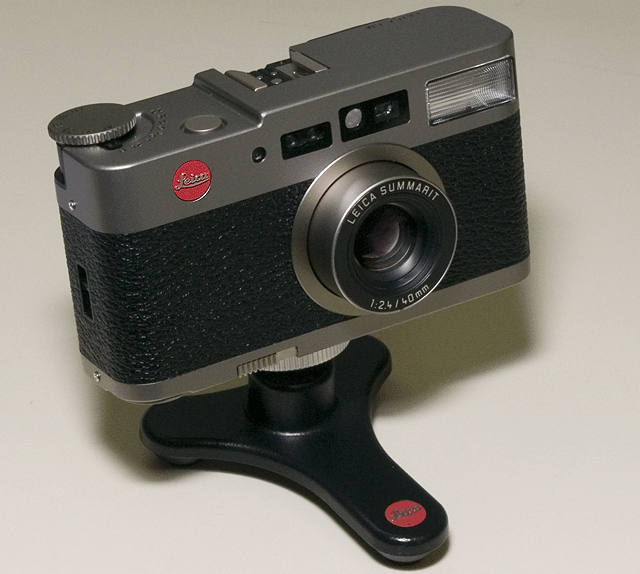
Leica CM (2003–2006)

C (point and shoot) series

- AF-C1 (1989)
- C2 Zoom (1991)
- Z2X (1997–2001)
- Leica CM 40 mm (2003–2006)
- Leica CM Zoom (2003–2006)

Mini series

- Leica Mini (1991–1993)
- Leica Mini II (1993–1996)
- Leica Mini Zoom (1993–1997): Zoom lenses Vario Elmar 35–70 with luminous intensity 1:4-7,6. The design of the camera was created by Manfred Meinzer with Klaus-Dieter Schaefer. The Mini Zoom was manufactured by Kyocera for Leica Camera.
- Leica Mini III (1996–1997)

Minilux series

- Leica Minilux 40 mm (1995–2003)
- Leica Minilux Zoom (1998–2003)

The design is by Klaus-Dieter Schaefer and Manfred Meinzer, who made the design of the analogous Leica R8 and digital Leica S2, too.

Cx series

- C1 (2000–2005)
- C2 2002 made in China
- C3 (2002–2005)

Type		2006	2007	2008	2009	2010	2011	2012	2013	2014	2015	2016	2017	2018	2019	2020	2021	2022
Leica	M		M8			M9/ M9-P			M (240)/ M-P (240)				M10/ M10-P					M11
Leica	ME								M-E (220)			M (262)				M-E (240)		
Leica	MM								MM			MM (246)				M10M		
Leica	MD												M-D (262)		M10-D			
Leica	MR																M10-R	
Non-Leica		Epson R-D1 • Zenit M																

Type	1950s										1960s										1970s										1980s										1990s										2000s										2010s										2020s									
Type	50	51	52	53	54	55	56	57	58	59	60	61	62	63	64	65	66	67	68	69	70	71	72	73	74	75	76	77	78	79	80	81	82	83	84	85	86	87	88	89	90	91	92	93	94	95	96	97	98	99	00	01	02	03	04	05	06	07	08	09	10	11	12	13	14	15	16	17	18	19	20	21	22	23	24	25	26	27	28	29
Leica					M3																																																																											
Leica								M2																																																																								
Leica																	M4							M4		M4-2				M4-P			M6															M6 TTL						MP																										
Leica																						M5																															M7																				M6							
Leica										M1														Leica CL																																									M-A (127)															
Non-Leica	Konica Hexar RF • 35mm Bessa • Cosina Voigtländer • Minolta CLE • Rollei 35 RF • Zeiss Ikon																																																																															

Model	1960s										1970s										1980s										1990s										2000s									
Model	60	61	62	63	64	65	66	67	68	69	70	71	72	73	74	75	76	77	78	79	80	81	82	83	84	85	86	87	88	89	90	91	92	93	94	95	96	97	98	99	00	01	02	03	04	05	06	07	08	09
Leicaflex					Leicaflex				SL					SL2																																				
Leica R																	R3				R4						R5	R6				R7					R8						R9							
