= Fujitsu Arrows X F-10D =

Android smartphone

ARROWS X F-10D
- Brand: NTT Docomo
- Manufacturer: Fujitsu
- Type: Smartphone
- Series: docomo NEXT series
- First released: July 20, 2012; 14 years ago
- Predecessor: F-05D
- Compatible networks: 3.9G: Xi; 3G: FOMA (W-CDMA, HSDPA, HSUPA); 2G: GSM; Wi-Fi (IEEE 802.11a/b/g/n)
- Form factor: Slate
- Colors: Black; Blue; White
- Dimensions: 135 mm (5.3 in) H 67 mm (2.6 in) W 11.7 mm (0.46 in) D
- Weight: 152 g (5.4 oz)
- Operating system: Android 4.0.3, upgradable to 4.2.2
- System-on-chip: NVIDIA Tegra 3 AP33
- CPU: 1.5 GHz quad-core ARM Cortex-A9 (plus 400 MHz companion core)
- GPU: 12-core NVIDIA GeForce
- Memory: 1 GB RAM
- Storage: 16 GB ROM
- Removable storage: microSD (up to 2 GB), microSDHC (up to 32 GB)
- Battery: 1800 mAh
- Charging: Wireless charging (Qi / Okudake Charging), MHL microUSB
- Rear camera: 13.1 MP back-illuminated CMOS (Exmor R for mobile), Milbeaut Mobile image processor
- Front camera: 1.3 MP CMOS
- Display: 4.6 in (120 mm) TFT LCD, HD (1280×720 pixels), 16.77 million colors
- Water resistance: IPX5/IPX8
- Model: F-10D

The docomo NEXT series ARROWS X F-10D is an Android smartphone manufactured and developed by Fujitsu for the NTT Docomo, brand supporting both 3.9G Xi (LTE) and 3G FOMA networks. It is part of the docomo NEXT series.

The ARROWS X F-10D is the successor to the F-05D and was the first smartphone with a quad-core processor released by a Japanese carrier. While sharing fundamental hardware features with the simultaneous au counterpart, the ISW13F, the F-10D additionally incorporates Xi LTE connectivity and Qi wireless charging support, while measuring 1 mm thicker than the ISW13F.

== History ==
The ARROWS X F-10D was officially announced by NTT Docomo on July 18, 2012, followed by a formal market release on July 20, 2012. On May 8, 2013, NTT Docomo selected the F-10D as a target device for an official Android operating system upgrade. The system software update to Android 4.2.2 was released on November 6, 2013. NTT Docomo officially ended repair services and post-warranty technical support for the device on February 28, 2019.

== Specifications ==
=== Hardware ===
The device is powered by the NVIDIA Tegra 3 system-on-chip featuring a quad-core Cortex-A9 central processor alongside a 400 MHz "5th companion core" designed to minimize power consumption during low-demand tasks like standby, settings, voice calls, and text entry. The Tegra 3 platform integrates a 12-core NVIDIA GeForce GPU to support 3D gaming graphics, alongside a 1800 mAh removable battery.

The rear-facing camera features a f/2.4 aperture, 13.1-megapixel back-illuminated CMOS sensor (Exmor R for mobile) co-engineered with Fujitsu's Milbeaut Mobile image processing engine, capable of recording Full HD video (1920×1080 resolution). The front-facing camera features a 1.3-megapixel CMOS sensor. The smartphone meets IPX5 and IPX8 water resistance specifications. Unlike its sibling model, the REGZA Phone T-02D, the F-10D omits Mobacas broadcast capability, allowing it to integrate Qi wireless charging, which was excluded from the T-02D to avoid signal interference during wireless power transmission. Physical connectivity options include MHL output over a shared microUSB terminal for HDMI video delivery, standard 1Seg TV tuning, FeliCa mobile payment compatibility, and IrSimple infrared transmission.

=== Software ===
The smartphone originally shipped with Android 4.0.3 Ice Cream Sandwich, featuring Fujitsu's proprietary features such as predictive web browsing, a smart fingerprint sensor, Privacy Mode, milock app lock, Super Clear Voice 3, Pittari Voice, Slowly Voice, Awaseru Voice, Super Double Microphone, IntelliColor, Hold-On Display, Awaseru Zoom, Mindful Ringer, and Slide-in Launcher. The pre-installed software suite includes Health Life Diary (Karada Life), Sukkiri Alarm, Temperature and Humidity Checker, @F Mobile Support, Fujitsu Mobile Integrated Dictionary+, Easy Migration, NX! Eco, and the bundled mobile game Sonic the Hedgehog 4: Episode II.

==== Software updates ====
The Android 4.2.2 Jelly Bean software upgrade added lock screen camera activation and lock screen widgets, batch deletion in the recent apps menu, enlarged app icons in Palette UI, folder icon customization up to 9 apps in NX! Home, integrated dictionary lookup within the standard browser, customizable keyboard dimensions and backgrounds, improved UI responsiveness, Google Now, status bar action shortcuts, and Daydream screensavers, alongside Docomo's Data Storage BOX support.

== Known Issues ==
Software updates were distributed over-the-air by NTT Docomo to resolve identified device defects and stability issues:

- August 30, 2012 (Build V18R46F): Addressed an issue where removing and reinserting the battery while the power was on caused unexpected rebooting upon powering up.
- November 12, 2012 (Build V20R47F): Fixed an anomaly where USB charging occasionally failed to initiate when the screen was turned off, as well as a bug causing animated Deco-mail emojis to freeze in the sp-mode mail app.
- March 21, 2013 (Build V21R48A): Resolved a crash error that intermittently prevented the camera application from launching correctly.
- July 22, 2013 (Build V22R49C): Corrected a display bug where the screen turned off earlier than the configured sleep timeout interval.
- November 6, 2013 (Build V10R42A - OS Update): Fixed delayed GPS location acquisition within Xi service coverage areas during the major Android 4.2 upgrade.
- December 19, 2013 (Build V11R43B / V23R50D): Addressed random system reboots during 1Seg TV viewing, failures when toggling Wi-Fi state ON, and an issue where the charging indicator LED remained illuminated after removing the phone from the wireless charger.
- February 18, 2014 (Build V12R44A): Resolved software crashes occurring when opening the default camera or photo gallery applications following the Android 4.2 update.
