= Leica S-System =

Medium format digital single lens reflex camera system

The Leica S-System is a medium format digital single lens reflex camera system introduced by Leica Camera in 1996. Beginning with the Leica S1, a prototype top-end studio digital camera unveiled at Photokina 1996. It went into production at the end of 1997.

== Leica S-System cameras ==
- Leica S1 – The Leica S1 Pro is a scanner camera with a very high resolution (26.4 megapixels) for stationary use introduced in 1996. On a 36×36 mm^{2} sensor 5140×5140 pixels are scanned and optically transferred to a connected computer. The object lens adapter system was exchangeable, thus object lenses of the systems Leica R, Leica M, Hasselblad, Mamiya 645, and all mechanical objective lenses from Canon (FD), Nikon, etc. can be used with the S1. The software for the S1 is a special SilverFast version, originally developed by LaserSoft Imaging for high-end scanners. Approximately 160 cameras were built and mostly sold to museums, archives and research institutes. Later on Leica introduced the S1 Highspeed with very quick scanning and the S1 Alpha with half the resolution to the market.
- Leica S2 – In 2008, Leica announced plans to offer an S-System – DSLR with a Kodak-made custom CCD image sensor measuring 30×45 mm and containing 37 million pixels. This sensor has a 26% longer diagonal and 56% larger area than a "full-frame″ 24×36 mm DSLR sensor and outputs an approximately 5000x7500 pixel image. The Leica S2 is thus essentially a medium format camera in a "35 mm SLR"-sized body. The new "Maestro" image processor used in the S2 was developed by Fujitsu based on the Milbeaut and the autofocus system (Leica's first to see production) was developed in house. The S2 series body, lenses and accessories were available in 2009.
- Leica S (Typ 006) – Leica announced the Leica S (Typ 006) in September 2012. It replaces the Leica S2, having a new sensor board with improved noise characteristics.
- Leica S (Typ 007) – Leica announced the Leica S (Typ 007) in September 2014. It replaces the Typ 006's CCD with a new CMOS image sensor. It offers improved noise characteristics, stills at 3.5 frames/second, and 4K video.
- Leica S3 – Leica announced the Leica S3 in October 2018. The camera specs were finally released in early 2020, to be available for sale in the spring.

== Leica S lenses ==
A series of new Leica lenses is manufactured specifically for the S2 and Leica claims they offer unsurpassed resolution and contrast at all apertures and focusing distances, even exceeding the sensor's capabilities. Lenses offered for the S2 include Summarit-S in normal (70 mm), wideangle (35 mm), and macro (120 mm) varieties, and Tele-Elmar (180 mm) portrait-length telephotos; these are available in versions that feature integrated multi-leaf blade shutters ("Central Shutter", or CS), in addition to the focal-plane shutter in the camera body, to enable higher flash sync speeds.

- Super-Elmar-S 1:3.5/24 mm ASPH.
- Elmarit-S 1:2.8/30 mm ASPH.
- Elmarit-S 1:2.8/30 mm ASPH. CS
- Summarit-S 1:2.5/35 mm ASPH.
- Summarit-S 1:2.5/35 mm ASPH. CS
- Elmarit-S 1:2.8/45 mm ASPH.
- Elmarit-S 1:2.8/45 mm ASPH. CS
- Summarit-S 1:2.5/70 mm ASPH.
- Summarit-S 1:2.5/70 mm ASPH. CS
- Summicron-S 1:2/100 mm ASPH.
- Apo-Macro-Summarit-S 1:2.5/120 mm
- Apo-Macro-Summarit-S 1:2.5/120 mm CS
- TS-APO-Elmar-S 1:5.6/120 mm ASPH. (Schneider-Kreuznach design)
- Apo-Elmar-S 1:3.5/180 mm ASPH.
- Apo-Elmar-S 1:3.5/180 mm ASPH. CS
- Vario-Elmar-S 1:3.5-5.6/30–90 mm ASPH.

== See also ==
- Leica Camera
- Leica L-Mount
