= Leica M-D (Typ 262) =

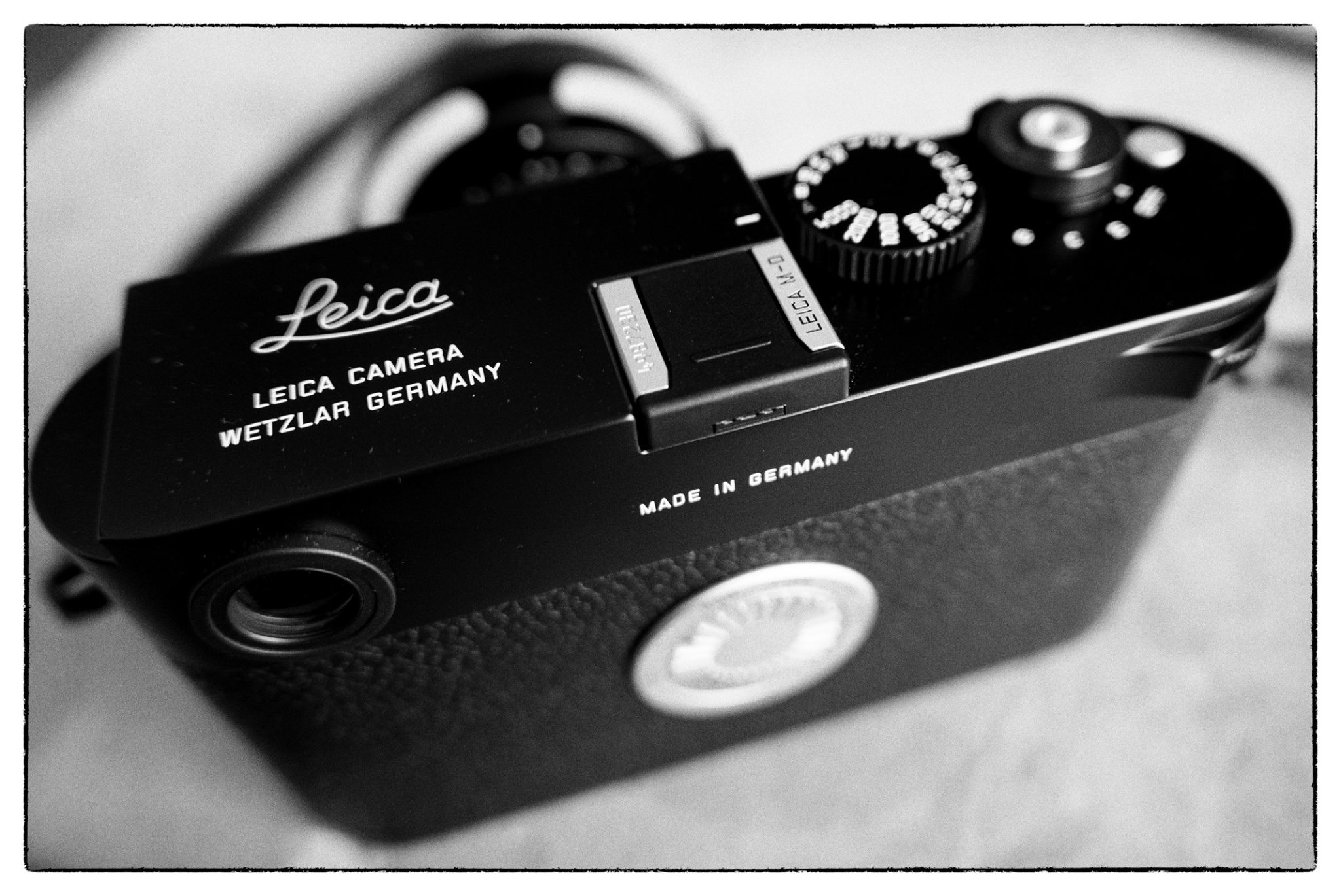

Lens
- Lens mount: Leica M-mount

Sensor/medium
- Sensor type: CMOS
- Sensor size: 23.9 × 35.8 mm
- Maximum resolution: 5976 × 3992 pixels (24 MP)
- Film size: ISO 200 to ISO 6400
- Recording medium: SD cards up to 2 GB, SDHC cards up to 32 GB, SDXC cards

Shutter
- Shutter: 60 s to 1/4000 s

Viewfinder
- Viewfinder: Large, bright, combined bright-line viewfinder with automatic parallax compensation
- Viewfinder magnification: 0.68 x

General
- LCD screen: No LCD screen
- Battery: 1 lithium ion rechargeable battery, nominal voltage 7.4V
- Dimensions: 138.6 × 42 × 80 mm (5.45 × 1.65 × 3.15 in)
- Weight: 680 g (24 oz) (with battery)
- Made in: Germany

Chronology
- Predecessor: None (Leica M Edition 60)
- Successor: Leica M10-D

The Leica M-D (Typ 262) was a digital rangefinder camera released by Leica Camera on 28 April 2016. The M-D is the second digital camera in the Leica M mount line-up without the rear LCD screen. The first such camera was the Leica M Edition 60 that founded on 16 September 2014, and was released to mark the sixtieth anniversary of its Leica M rangefinder system. Only 600 of these models were made, and were sold for about $18,000/£12,000. The M-D however was a full production model. The camera went on sale in May 2016 with a price of $5995/£4650.

Functionally the Leica M-D is almost exactly the same as the Leica M (Typ 262), but without the rear screen and menu buttons. Leica says the camera is designed for the ‘essentials of photography’, or ‘Das Wesentliche’, and that it should help photographers concentrate on the important elements of image making rather than distracting camera functions. The photographer controls only the aperture, shutter speed and ISO settings. Instead of the rear screen is the ISO settings dial in silver, which harks back to the Leica film rangefinders. The camera only records DNG Raw image format.

The M-D features a 24 Megapixels CMOS sensor and an ISO range of 200–6400. The camera's top and bottom plates are made of brass. The viewfinder contains a magnification of 0.68x and offers bright frame markings for 35/135mm, 28/90mm and 50/75mm lenses. The camera does not include the Leica 'red dot' logo, as the company wanted the camera to be as discreet as possible for street photography. The single frame shutter is particularly quiet.

Type		2006	2007	2008	2009	2010	2011	2012	2013	2014	2015	2016	2017	2018	2019	2020	2021	2022
Leica	M		M8			M9/ M9-P			M (240)/ M-P (240)				M10/ M10-P					M11
Leica	ME								M-E (220)			M (262)				M-E (240)		
Leica	MM								MM			MM (246)				M10M		
Leica	MD												M-D (262)		M10-D			
Leica	MR																M10-R	
Non-Leica		Epson R-D1; Zenit M																
