= Leica M-E (Typ 240) =

Digital rangefinder camera

Leica M (Typ 240)
Overview
- Maker: Leica

Lens
- Lens mount: Leica M

Sensor/medium
- Sensor type: CMOS
- Sensor size: 35.8 x 23.9mm (Full frame type)
- Maximum resolution: 5976 x 3992 (24 megapixels)
- Film speed: 200-6400
- Recording medium: SD, SDHC or SDXC memory card

Shutter
- Shutter speeds: 1/4000s to 60s
- Continuous shooting: 3.0 frames per second

Viewfinder
- Viewfinder magnification: 0.68

Image processing
- Image processor: Maestro
- White balance: Yes

General
- Video recording: 1080p, 720p, 640*480 (VGA); 25 fps, 24 fps, 30 fps (VGA only)
- LCD screen: 3 inches with 921,000 dots
- Dimensions: 138.6 x 80 x 42mm (5.47 x 3.15 x 1.65 inches)
- Weight: 680 g (24 oz) including battery

Chronology
- Predecessor: Leica M (Typ 262)

The Leica M-E (Typ 240) is a digital rangefinder camera announced by Leica Camera on June 24, 2019. The Leica M-E (Typ 240) is part of the long running Leica M mount line. It features a 24 Megapixels full-frame CMOS sensor (with a top ISO of 6400), Leica's Maestro processor, and a 2GB buffer for sustained burst capture. Video can be captured at 1080/30p. As with all Leica M-series models, the camera is hand-built and weather-sealed. The camera is finished in "Anthracite Paint" with black leather wrap and limited to 700 units worldwide.

The Leica M-E (Typ 240) is a successor of the Leica M-E (Typ 220) and the Leica M (Typ 262).

Type		2006	2007	2008	2009	2010	2011	2012	2013	2014	2015	2016	2017	2018	2019	2020	2021	2022
Leica	M		M8			M9/ M9-P			M (240)/ M-P (240)				M10/ M10-P					M11
Leica	ME								M-E (220)			M (262)				M-E (240)		
Leica	MM								MM			MM (246)				M10M		
Leica	MD												M-D (262)		M10-D			
Leica	MR																M10-R	
Non-Leica		Epson R-D1; Zenit M																
