= Leica S (Typ 006) =

Leica S (Typ 006) Leica S-E (Typ 006)
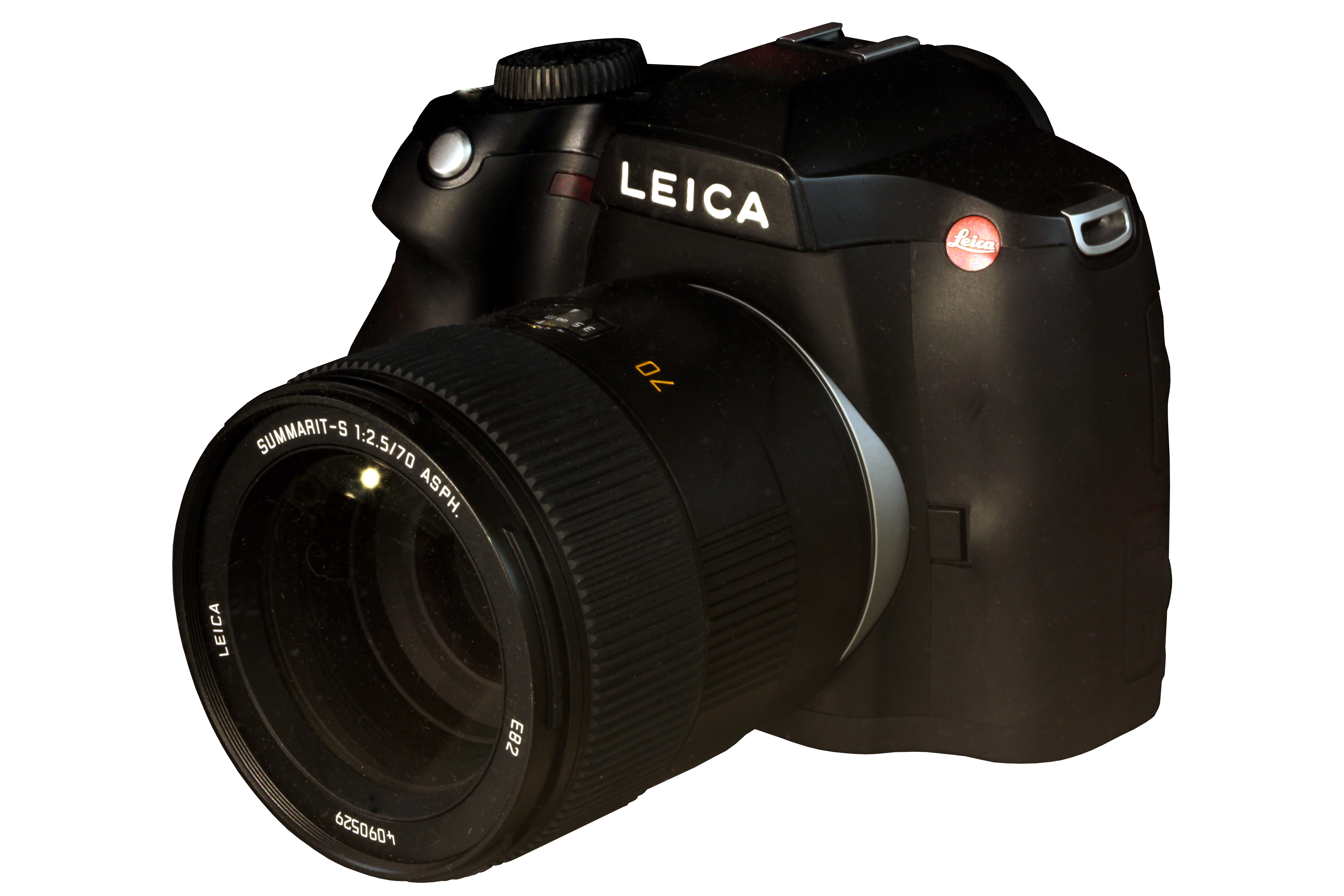
- Leica S2

Overview
- Maker: Leica Camera AG
- Intro price: $21,950

Lens
- Lens mount: Leica S-System

Sensor/medium
- Sensor type: CCD
- Sensor size: 45×30 mm (Leica Pro Format)
- Maximum resolution: 7,500 × 5,000 (37.5 megapixels)
- Film speed: ISO 100 – 1,600
- Recording medium: SD/SDHC/SDXC and CF memory card slots

Focusing
- Focus: Phase AF system

Flash
- Flash: no internal flash, flash out shoe for optional flash systems

Shutter
- Shutter: Focal plane shutter and Central shutter (FPS / CS)
- Shutter speeds: 1/4,000 s to 32 s
- Continuous shooting: approx. 1.5 frames per second

Viewfinder
- Viewfinder: optical
- Viewfinder magnification: 0.87×
- Frame coverage: 98%

Image processing
- Image processor: Maestro II
- White balance: Yes

General
- Video recording: Super35 sensor format: Full Frame sensor format:
- LCD screen: 3 inches LCD with 921,600 dots, 16 mil. colours
- Data port: USB 2.0
- Body features: Dust- and spraywater proof
- Dimensions: 160×80×120 mm (6.3×3.1×4.7 in)
- Weight: 1,260 g (44 oz) including battery
- Made in: Germany

The Leica S is a digital camera first launched in 2012 as a successor to the S2 and produced until 2015.

Earlier versions of the sensor have corrosion issues and Leica offer a service to replace them.
