= Leica S2 =

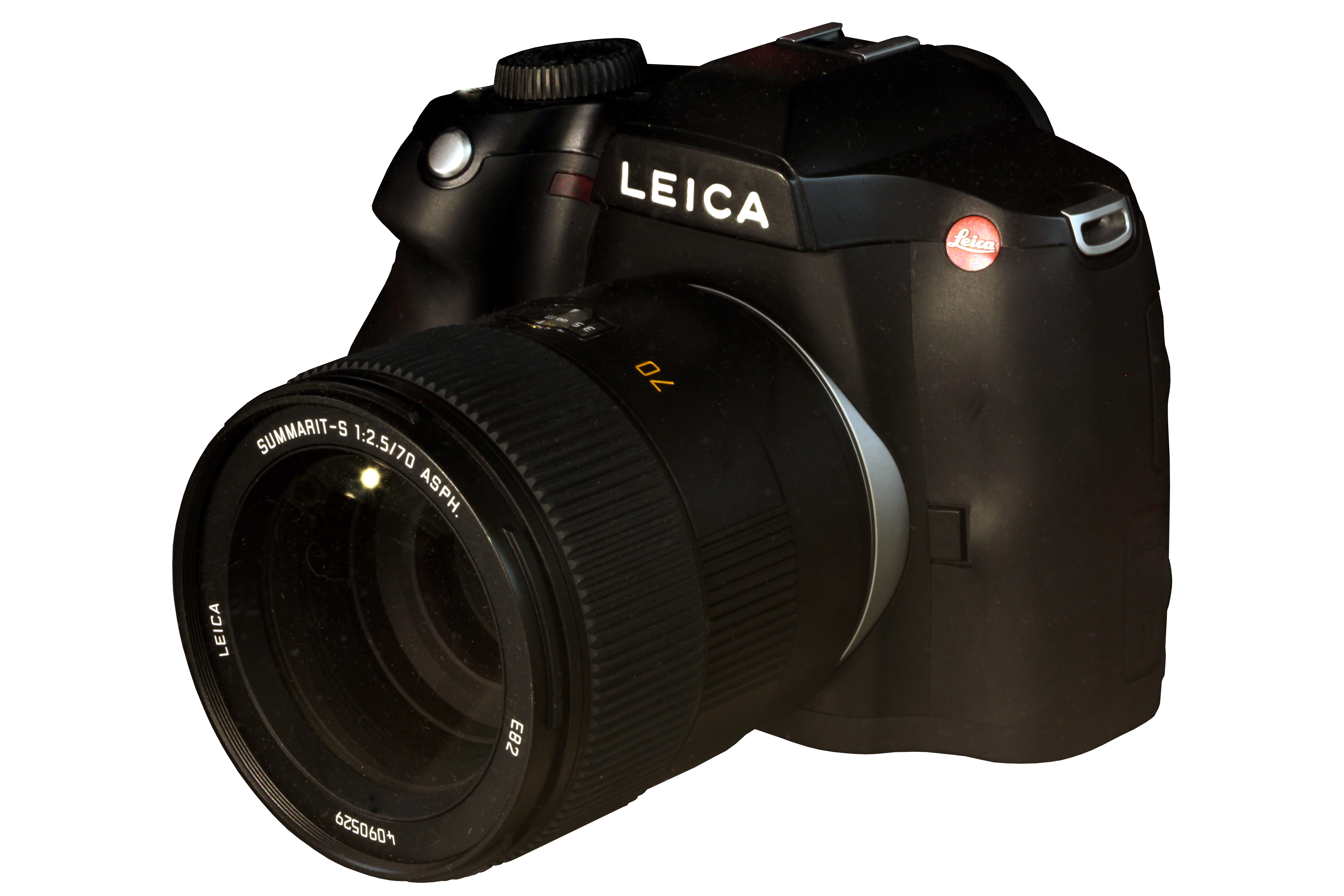

Overview
- Maker: Leica

Lens
- Lens mount: Leica S-System

Sensor/medium
- Sensor type: CCD
- Sensor size: 45 x 30 mm (Medium format type)
- Maximum resolution: 7500 x 5000 (38 megapixels)
- Film speed: 80-1250

Shutter
- Shutter speeds: 1/4000s to 32s
- Continuous shooting: 1.5 frames per second

Viewfinder
- Viewfinder magnification: 0.86
- Frame coverage: 96%

General
- LCD screen: 3 inches with 460,000 dots
- Dimensions: 160 x 120 x 81 mm (6.3 x 4.72 x 3.19 inches)
- Weight: 1,410 g (50 oz) including battery

The Leica S2 is a medium format digital SLR camera announced by Leica Camera on September 23, 2008.

It features a Kodak-made custom CCD sensor measuring 30×45 mm and containing 37 million pixels. This sensor has a 26% longer diagonal and 56% larger area than a "full-frame″ 24×36 mm DSLR sensor and outputs an approximately 5000x7500 pixel image.

The S2 is thus a medium format camera in a "35 mm SLR"-sized body. The new "Maestro" image processor used in the S2 was developed by Fujitsu based on the Milbeaut and the autofocus system (Leica's first to see production) was developed in house. The design of the body is by Manfred Meinzer, who made the design of the analogous Leica R8, too.

The S2 series body, lenses and accessories were available in 2009. A series of new Leica lenses is manufactured specifically for the S2 and Leica claims they offer unsurpassed resolution and contrast at all apertures and focusing distances, even exceeding the sensor's capabilities. Lenses offered for the S2 include Summarit-S in normal (70 mm), wideangle (35 mm), and macro (120 mm) varieties, and Tele-Elmar (180 mm) portrait-length telephotos; these are available in versions that feature integrated multi-leaf blade shutters ("Central Shutter", or CS), in addition to the focal-plane shutter in the camera body, to enable higher flash sync speeds.
