= Leica M-E =

Leica M-E (Typ 220)
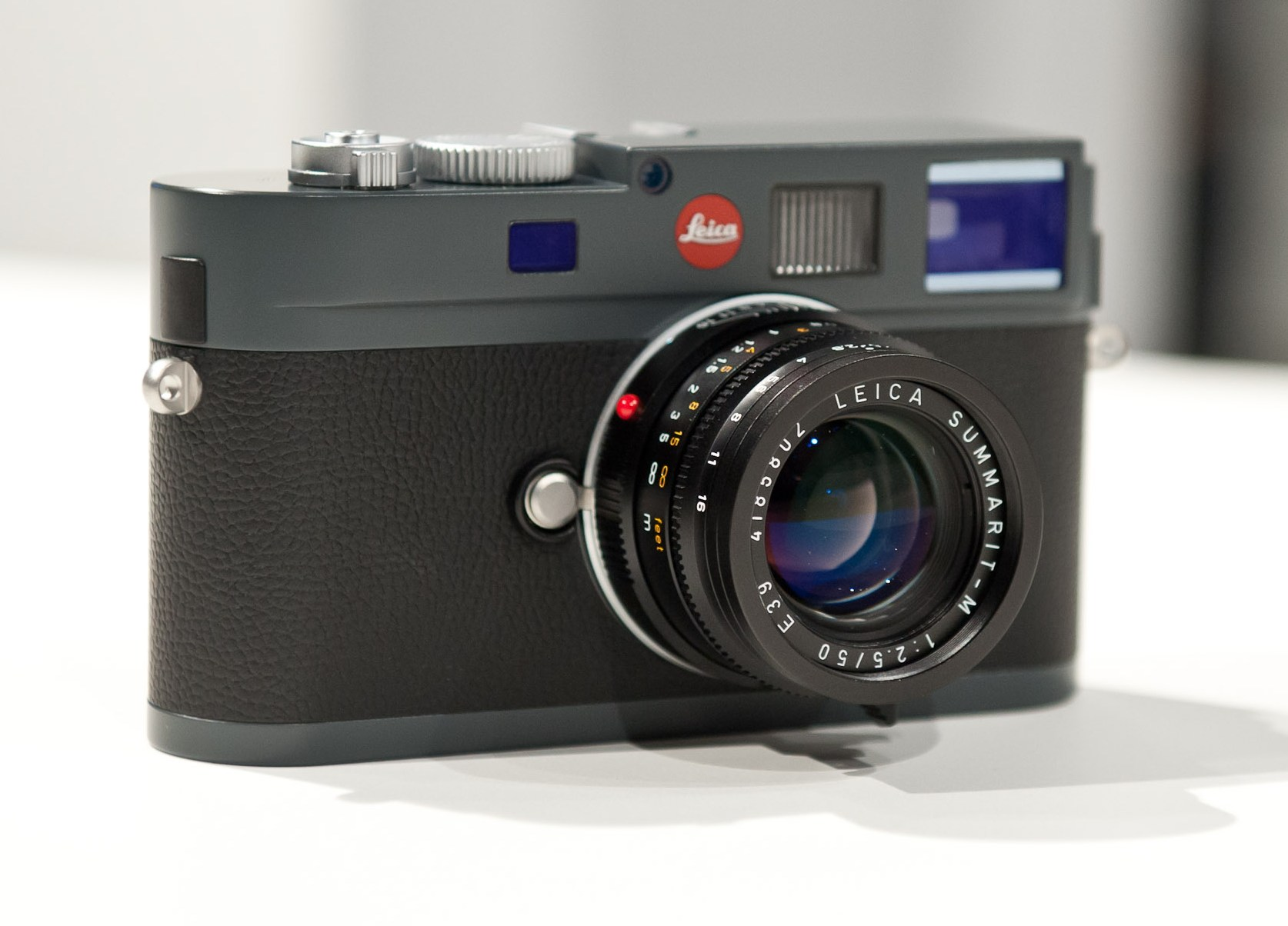

Overview
- Maker: Leica

Lens
- Lens mount: Leica M mount

Sensor/medium
- Sensor type: CCD
- Sensor size: 36 x 24mm (Full frame type)
- Maximum resolution: 5212 x 3472 (18 megapixels)
- Film speed: 80-2500
- Recording medium: SD, SDHC memory card

Shutter
- Shutter speeds: 1/4000s to 4s
- Continuous shooting: 2.0 frames per second

Viewfinder
- Viewfinder magnification: 0.68

Image processing
- White balance: Yes

General
- LCD screen: 2.5 inches with 230,000 dots
- Dimensions: 139 x 80 x 37mm (5.47 x 3.15 x 1.46 inches)
- Weight: 585 g (21 oz) including battery

Chronology
- Successor: Leica M (Typ 262)

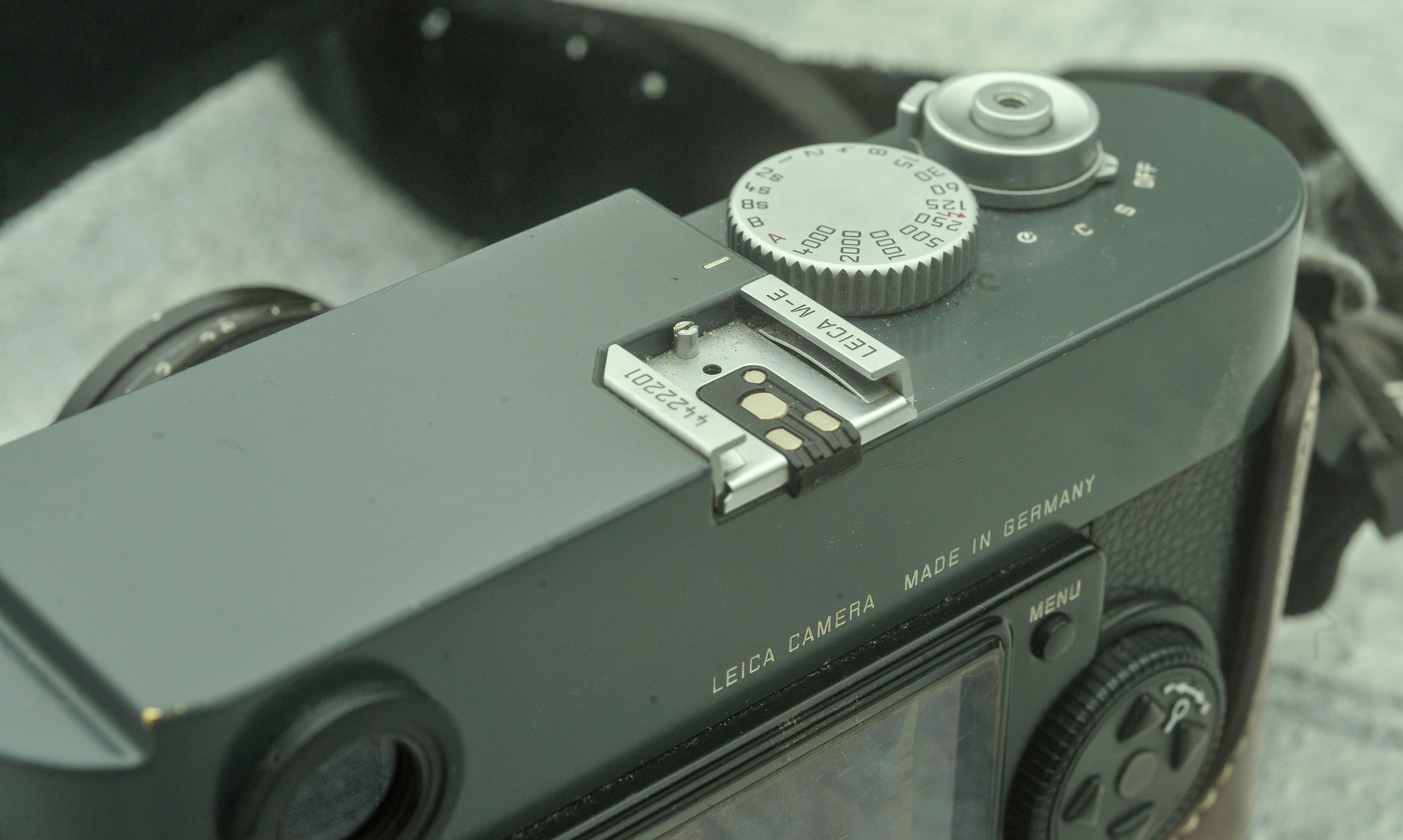
Leica M-E 220 in anthracite grey.

The Leica M-E (Typ 220) is a digital rangefinder camera manufactured by Leica Camera. It was released on 17 September 2012. The M-E is Leica's first entry-level rangefinder model, with a technical specification that is nearly identical to the Leica M9, and based around the same 18MP full frame CCD sensor. It does not offer the M9's built-in USB port, but keeps pace with an identical 2 frames per second continuous shooting mode, hot shoe and Leica's classic rangefinder design. The M-E does not have a frame-lines lever, it preselects the correct frame-line for any lens when it is attached. The M-E, like the M9 and the M Monochrom, was made of brass around a magnesium chassis. The M-E is only available with an anthracite grey paint finish.

The Leica M-E (Typ 220) was succeeded by the Leica M (Typ 262) in 2015.

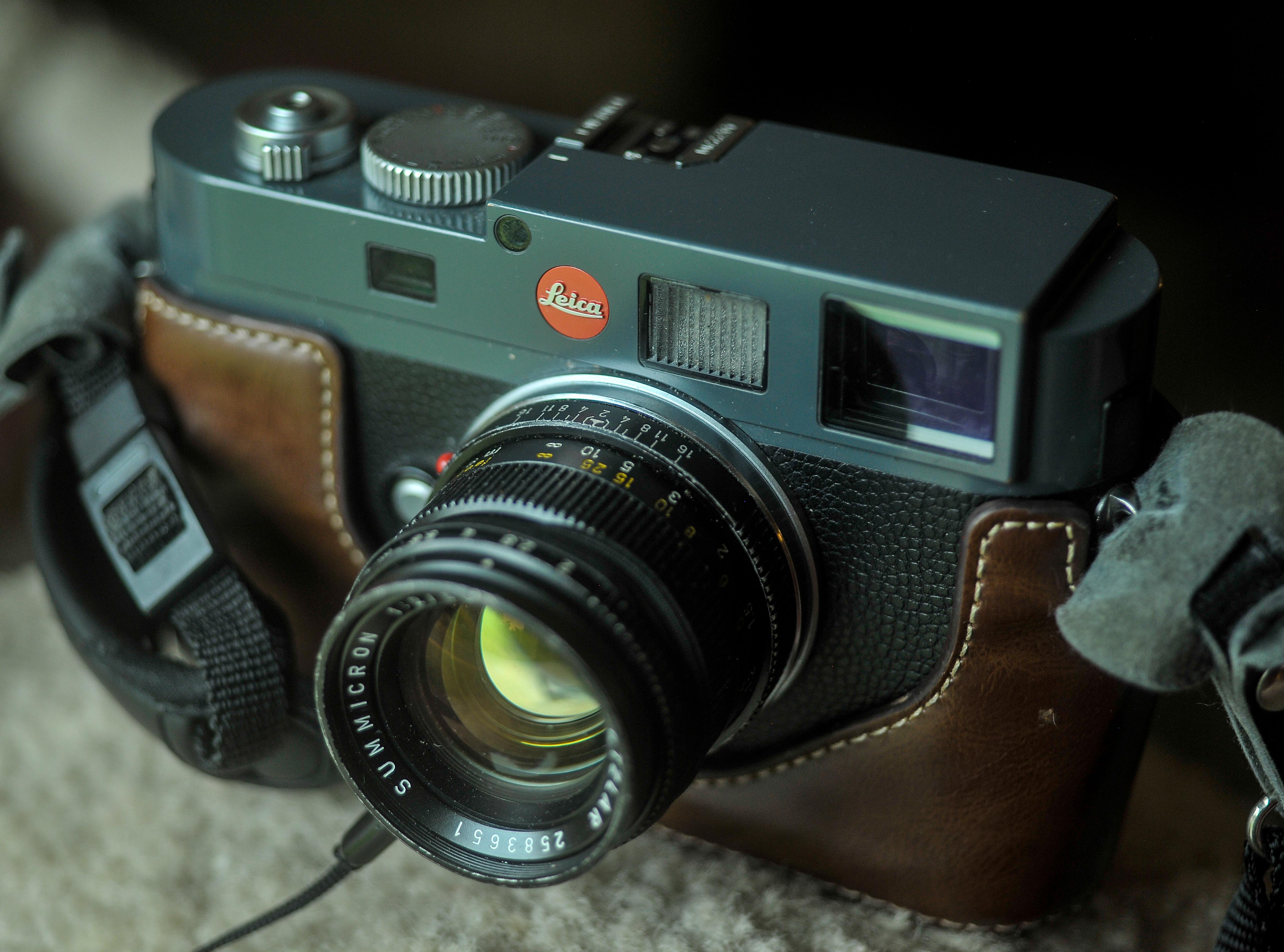

Type		2006	2007	2008	2009	2010	2011	2012	2013	2014	2015	2016	2017	2018	2019	2020	2021	2022
Leica	M		M8			M9/ M9-P			M (240)/ M-P (240)				M10/ M10-P					M11
Leica	ME								M-E (220)			M (262)				M-E (240)		
Leica	MM								MM			MM (246)				M10M		
Leica	MD												M-D (262)		M10-D			
Leica	MR																M10-R	
Non-Leica		Epson R-D1 • Zenit M																
