= Leica M (Typ 262) =

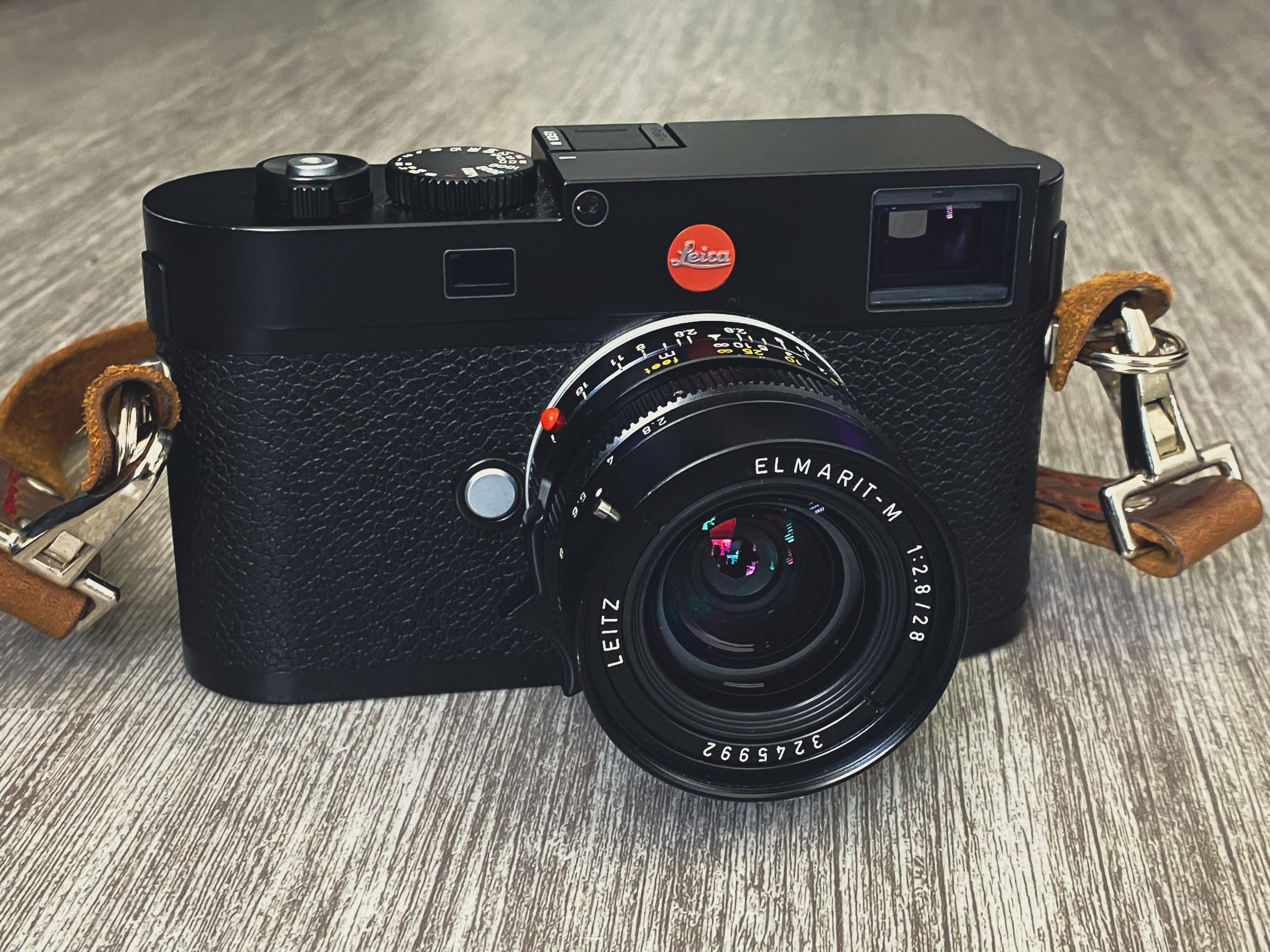

Overview
- Maker: Leica

Lens
- Lens mount: Leica M mount

Sensor/medium
- Sensor type: CMOS
- Sensor size: 35.8 x 23.9mm (Full frame type)
- Maximum resolution: 5952 x 3976 (24 megapixels)
- Film speed: 100-6400
- Recording medium: SD, SDHC or SDXC memory card

Shutter
- Shutter speeds: 1/4000s to 60s
- Continuous shooting: 3.0 frames per second

Viewfinder
- Viewfinder magnification: 0.68

Image processing
- Image processor: Maestro
- White balance: Yes

General
- LCD screen: 3 inches with 921,000 dots
- Dimensions: 139 x 80 x 42mm (5.47 x 3.15 x 1.65 inches)
- Weight: 680 g (24 oz) including battery

Chronology
- Predecessor: Leica M-E
- Successor: Leica M-E (Typ 240)

The Leica M (Typ 262) is a digital rangefinder camera announced by Leica Camera on November 19, 2015. The shutter and cocking mechanism are much quieter than in the earlier and higher-priced M Typ 240, and allow two frames per second to be recorded in single shot mode. The model omits the Typ 240's live view and video capabilities, and has a much simpler menu structure and one-button access to white balance settings. The Leica M (Typ 262) has a CMOS full-frame sensor with a 24 Megapixel resolution, with an ISO of up to 6400. The usual brass camera body has been replaced with an aluminum alloy top plate, for a reduction in weight.

In 2017 Leica released a Leica M (Typ 262) with a ‘red anodized finish’ with a special edition Leica Summicron-M 50 mm f/2 ASPH in the same finish. Only 100 bodies were made.

The Leica M (Typ 262) superseded the Leica M-E (Typ 220), and was superseded by Leica M-E (Typ 240) in 2019.

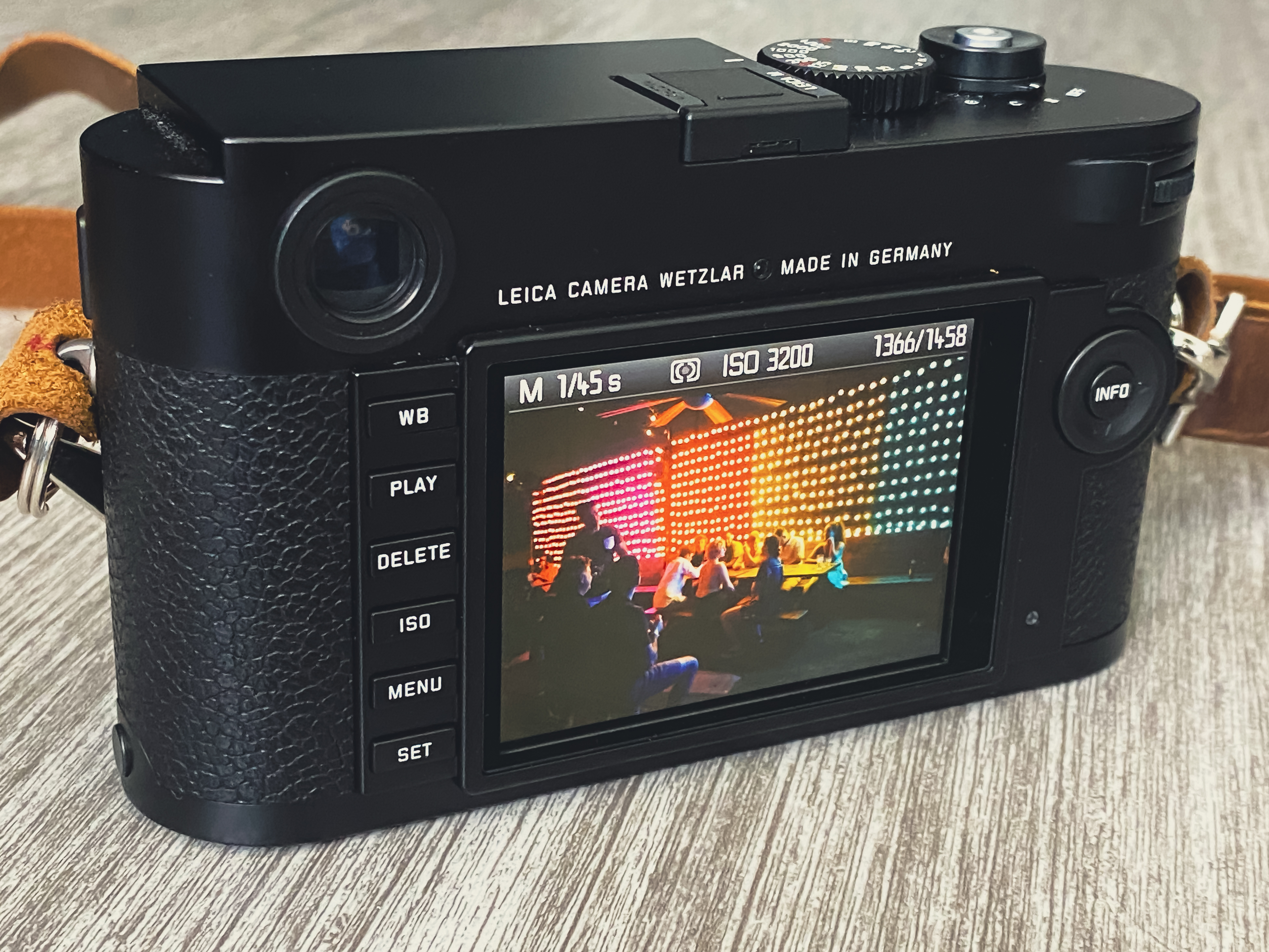
Leica M (Typ 262) back

| Type | | 2006 | 2007 | 2008 | 2009 | 2010 | 2011 | 2012 | 2013 | 2014 | 2015 | 2016 | 2017 | 2018 | 2019 | 2020 | 2021 | 2022 |
| Leica | M | | M8 | | | M9/ M9-P | | | M (240)/ M-P (240) | | | | M10/ M10-P | | | | | M11 |
| Leica | ME | | | | | | | | M-E (220) | | | M (262) | | | | M-E (240) | | |
| Leica | MM | | | | | | | | MM | | | MM (246) | | | | M10M | | |
| Leica | MD | | | | | | | | | | | | M-D (262) | | M10-D | | | |
| Leica | MR | | | | | | | | | | | | | | | | M10-R | |
| Non-Leica | | Epson R-D1; Zenit M | | | | | | | | | | | | | | | | |
