= Leica R8–R9 =

Leica R8
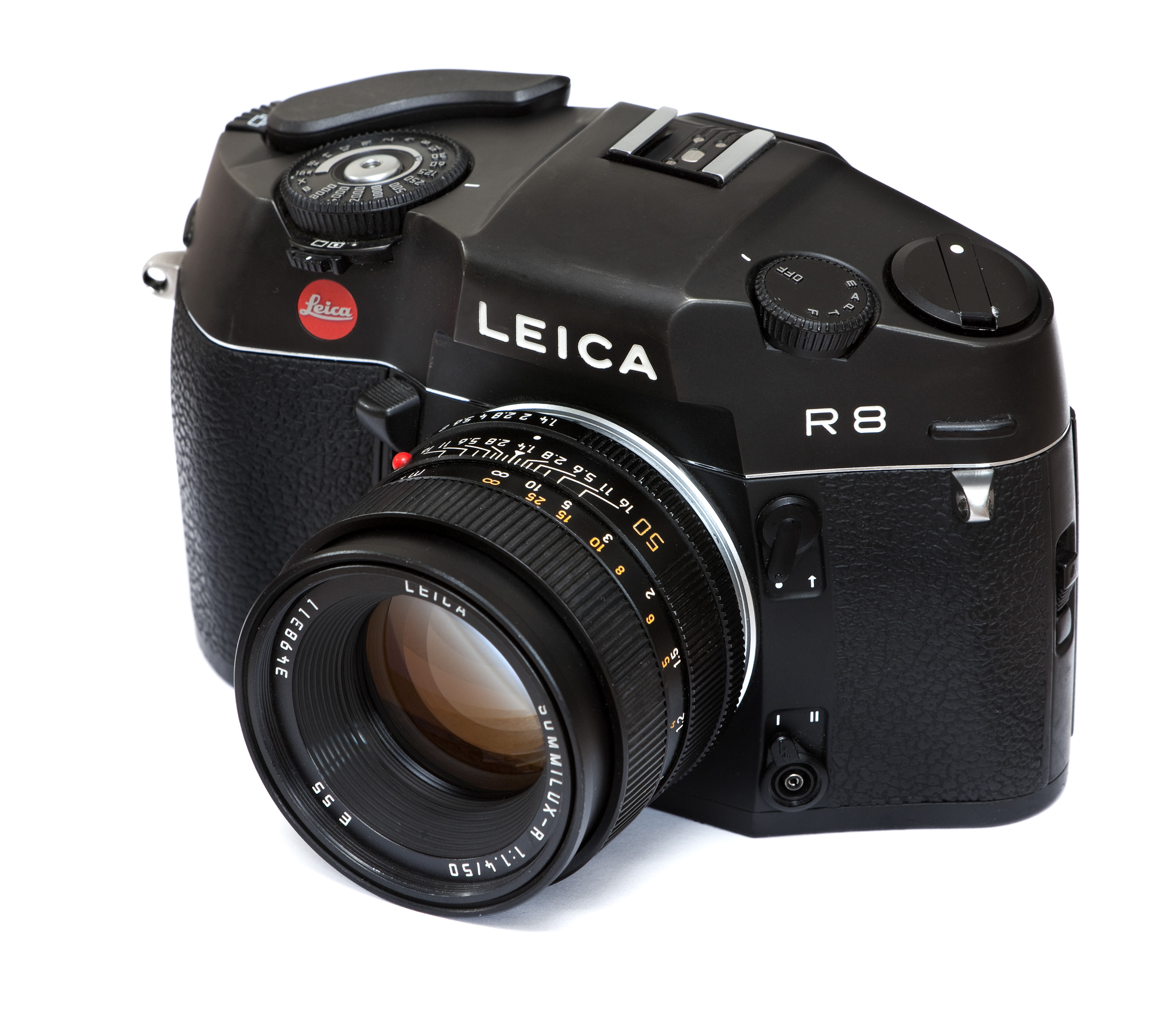
- Black Leica R8

Overview
- Maker: Leica
- Type: 35 mm SLR
- Released: 1996
- Production: 1996–2002

Lens
- Lens mount: Leica R mount

Sensor/medium
- Film format: 35 mm
- Film size: 36 mm × 24 mm

Focusing
- Focus: Manual focus

Exposure/metering
- Exposure: Shutter, Aperture priority autoexposure; manual

Flash
- Flash: Hot shoe and PC terminal

General
- Dimensions: 51 × 86 × 136 mm, 560 g
- Made in: Germany

Chronology
- Predecessor: Leica R4-R7
- Successor: Leica R9

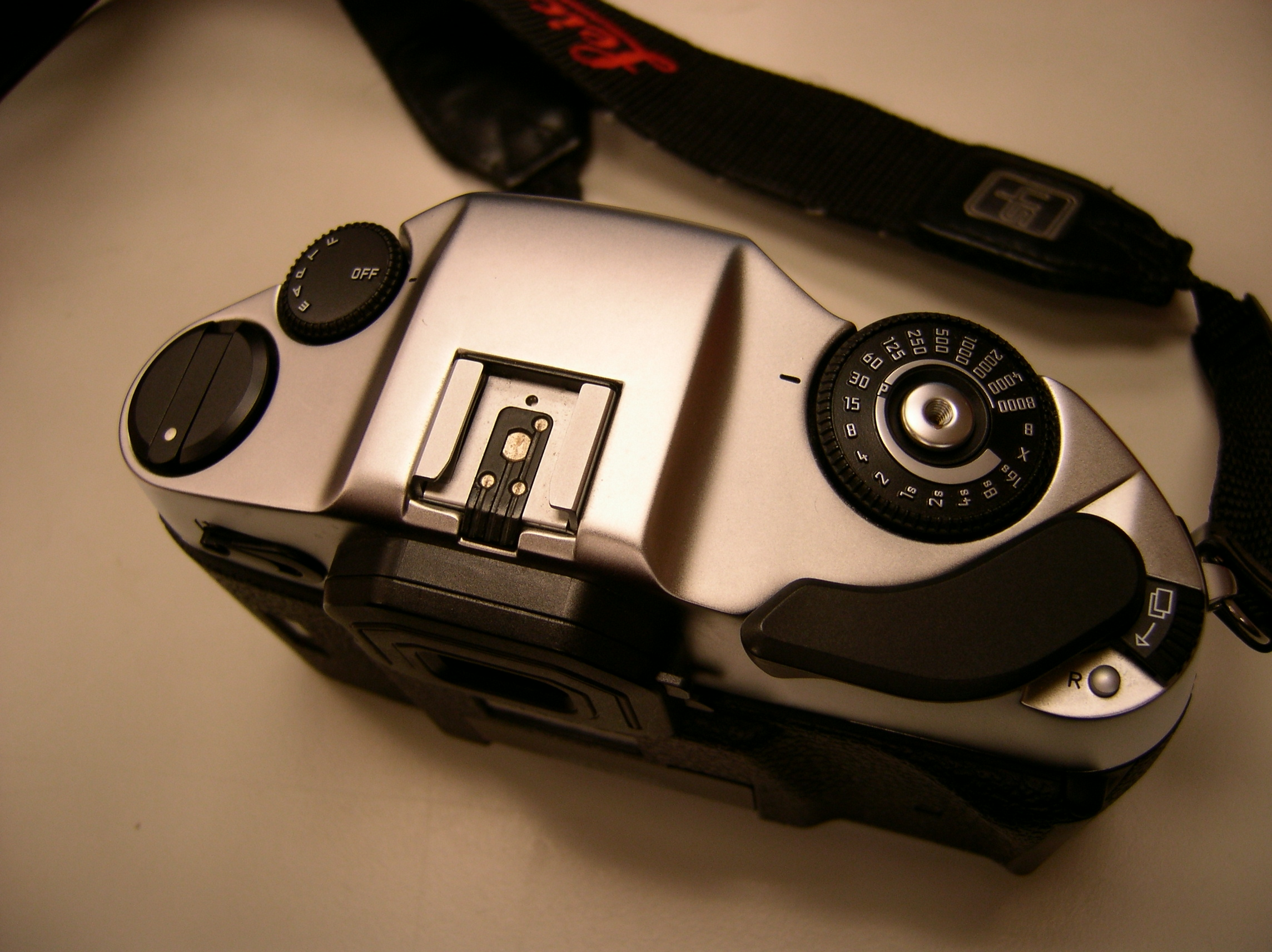
Leica R8 Top view

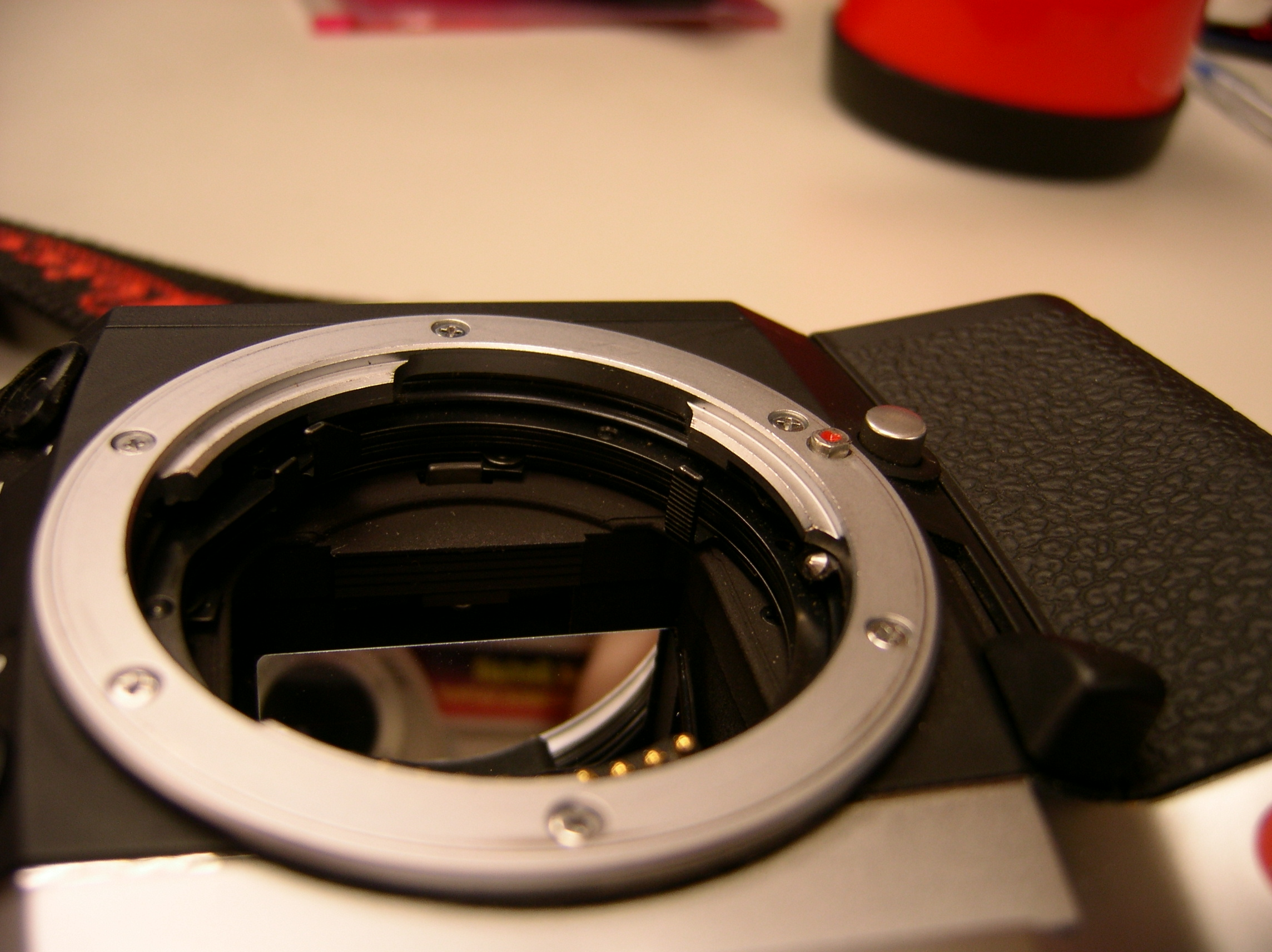
Leica R8 lens mount, showing the ROM contacts

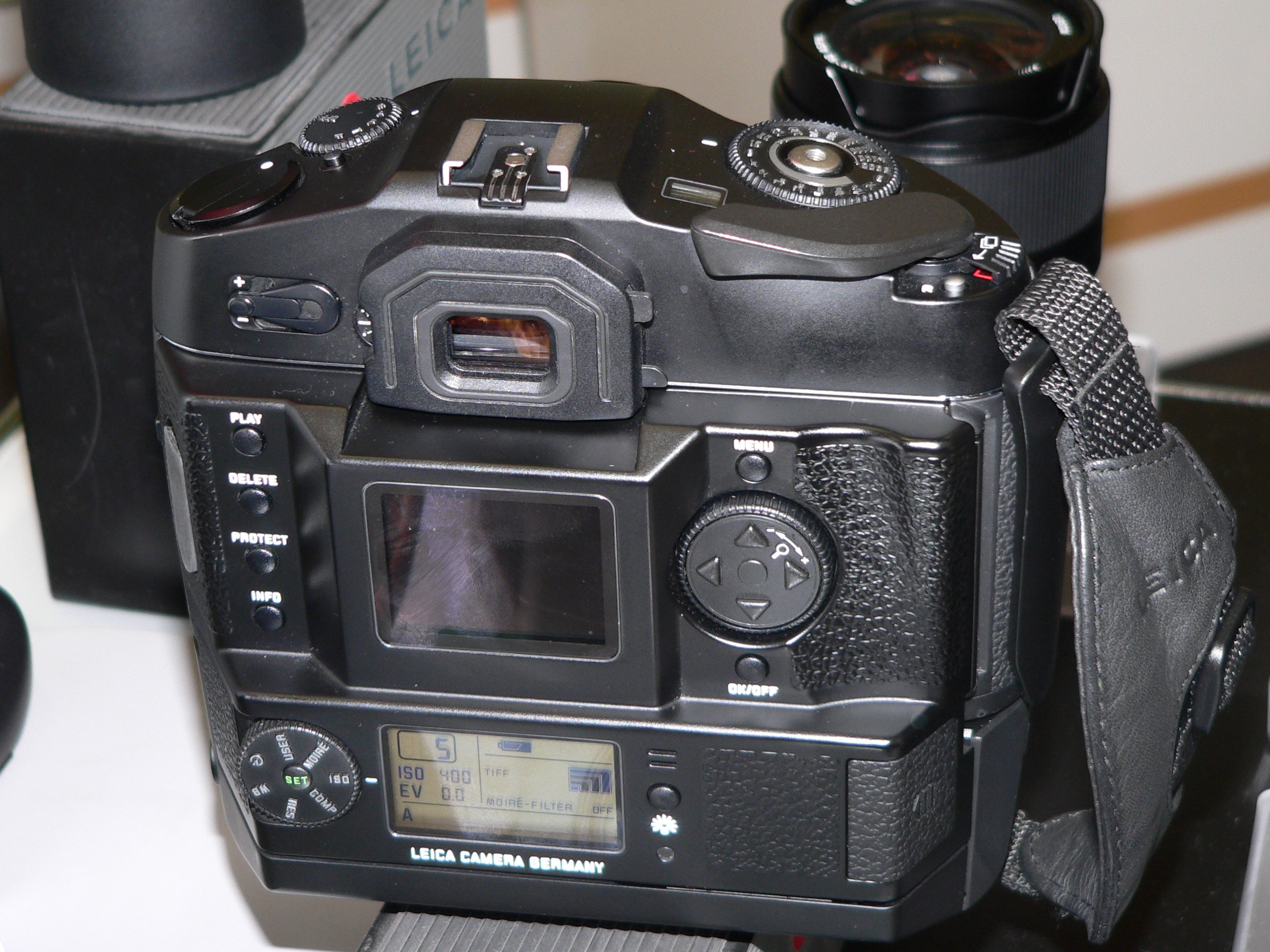
Digital back mounted on R9

The Leica R8 & R9 are manual focus 35 mm single-lens reflex cameras produced by the German firm Leica as the final models of their R series. Development of the R8 began in 1990: the camera was introduced at the 1996 photokina trade show, and was succeeded by the similar Leica R9 in 2002.

Both can be fitted with the Digital Modul R (DMR) digital back (discontinued in 2007 ) and used as a digital camera making them the only 35 mm SLRs to take a user-installable digital back. The R8 was the first R-series camera to have no association with Minolta, being solely a Leica design and showing a clear stylistic change compared to prior bodies.

== Leica R8 ==
=== Design ===
Industrial designer Manfred Meinzer was chiefly responsible for the R8 design, along with a team of designers largely new to Leica or drawn from outside. The R8 was intended as a clean break from the previous generation of Leica R cameras, which had been developed in cooperation with Minolta. A key design goal was to evoke the Leica M and its smooth top plate; instead of a raised pentaprism as in previous R series cameras, the R8 has sloped "shoulders" that blend almost seamlessly into the pentaprism housing. The shape is strongly asymmetrical, especially in plan view, with a bulged right handgrip and smaller, tapered left-hand side.

Another goal was to improve the ergonomics and to place controls so they could be easily reached and operated without removing the eye from the viewfinder. Although the R8 is capable of fully automated exposure and (with the addition of the integrally-styled motor drive or winder) automated film transport, the location of the shutter speed dial lends itself to manual exposure control, as many Leica customers preferred this. In this it differs strongly from other contemporary SLRs, which were designed primarily for automatic operation. The top control wheels are sunk into the top plate, with knurled edges protruding at the front where they can easily be operated by the photographer's fingertips.

The R8 is substantially larger and heavier than the R4-R7 series cameras, being about a third heavier at 890g than the R7. This is partly explained by being built to take and balance the heavier zoom lenses in the Leica R lens range. The styling of the R8 proved controversial, some photographers consider it ugly and dubbed it the "Hunchback of Solms" (Solms is the German town where Leica was headquartered; the company moved back to its original home town of Wetzlar in 2014). The size and bulk of the camera attracted much criticism although the R8/9 fitted with motor winder were almost exactly the same size and weight as the preceding R7 with motor winder.

== Technical information ==
The R8 was the most complex camera Leica had ever constructed, containing extensive electronics including a microprocessor, despite its manual operation bias, and in addition was built in a modular fashion to integrate with motor drive units and new backs such as the Digital Modul R.

=== Shutter ===
The shutter used was a Copal vertically running metal-leaf unit capable of speeds between 1/8000 and 32 seconds steplessly in automatic modes, or to 16 seconds in half-stop steps in manual mode, as well as Bulb. The flash X-sync speed is 1/250 sec.

The shutter release is in the center of the shutter-speed dial and is threaded for a cable release. The optional Motor-Drive gives additional front and vertical-grip releases.

=== Metering ===
The highly sophisticated metering system allows free choice of metering mode and exposure mode. By contrast, the earlier R4-R7 series lacked multi pattern metering and offered only pre-set combinations of metering and exposure.

Three metering modes are offered:

- Integrated centre weighted
- Selective
- Multi pattern (Matrix)

and five exposure modes:

- Manual
- Aperture priority semi automatic
- Shutter priority semi automatic
- Program fully automatic
- Flash pre exposure measurement

Mounted on the secondary mirror itself was a single cell for selective measurement and in the camera base was a five segment cell for integrated measurement with multi-pattern measurement. Using both provided six measurement areas. Switching of both metering mode and exposure mode was electronic. Flash pre-exposure measurement was provided allowing the camera's meter to measure manually controlled flash such as studio flash. Pre-flash measurement was always selective and in addition to automatic TTL flash measurement during exposure with suitable automatic flash units which was always full field using two small light cells either side of the main multi-pattern cell. Exposure compensation was available in all exposure modes.

Program mode can be biased towards longer or shorter shutter speeds by using the shutter speed dial. Also in program mode automatic flash exposure was fully controlled by the camera: off in daylight conditions, fill in flash with low light, full flash when dark. Normal flash synchronisation speed is 1/250s and with suitable flash units can be up to the camera's highest speed of 1/8000s.

The viewfinder display was digital LED visible in any lighting.

=== Lens mount changes ===
The same bayonet and stepped cam of earlier R cameras was used, but additional electrical contacts called "ROM Contacts" were added to convey lens focal length setting. Any lens fitted with the R stepped cam may be used, but very early lenses fitted only with sloped cams (1 or 2 cam lenses) may damage the ROM contacts and should first be fitted with the stepped cam.

Lens / camera combinations are as follows:

| | Leicaflex | SL/SL2 | R3-R7 | R8-R9 |
|---|---|---|---|---|
| 1 Cam | | | | ! |
| 2 Cam | | | | ! |
| 3 Cam | | | | |
| R Only | | | | |
| ROM | | | | + |

| + | full aperture metering + ROM data |
| | full aperture metering |
| | stop-down metering |
| ! | stop-down metering, possible damage to camera contacts |
| | will not fit |

Leica 1 cam, 2 cam, 3 cam, & R stepped cam lenses may be fitted with ROM contacts but as this entails removal of the original sloped cams they would then be incompatible with the original Leicaflex cameras. This was the first break in on-going compatibility of Leica reflex lenses.

== Leica R9 ==
R9
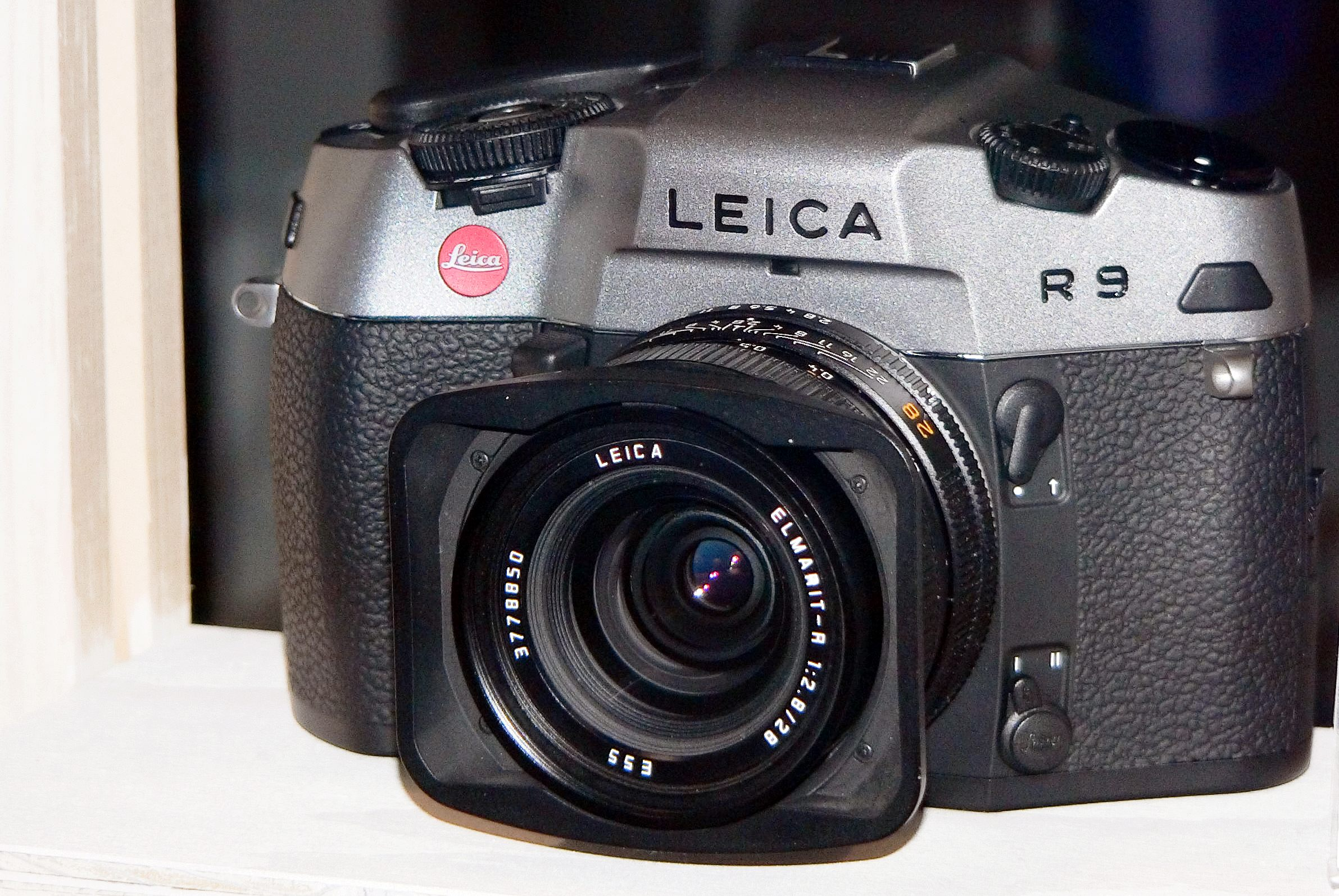

Overview
- Maker: Leica
- Type: Still image camera
- Released: 2002
- Production: 2002-2009

Lens
- Lens: Leica R bayonet

Sensor/medium
- Sensor type: Film
- Sensor size: 24×36 mm
- Recording medium: 135 film

Focusing
- Focus: Manual focus

Shutter
- Shutter speeds: 1/8000 to 32 s & bulb

General
- Made in: Germany

Chronology
- Predecessor: Leica R8

The R9 was an evolutionary step from the R8 and appears superficially very similar; enough so that some have opined that it should have been simply a Mark II of the R8, or in Leica nomenclature, an "R8.2".[2]

The silver top-plate color available on the R8 was replaced by an 'Anthracite' color on the R9; black remained available. Another external change was the addition of an LCD frame counter on the top plate between the wind lever and the shutter-speed dial. The mode selector dial gained a lock, after many R8 user complaints that it was too easily moved from the desired setting when handling the camera. The rear LCD gained a backlight so it could be viewed in dim lighting.

The mass of the R9 was reduced by 100g (to 790g) from the R8, achieved by switching to a magnesium casting for the top plate (formerly zinc alloy) and substituting aluminium for steel at the bottom plate's frame.

Electronic changes included the ability to tune the sensitivity of matrix metering in steps of 0.1 EV independently of the other metering modes, and several improvements to the flash support. Metz's HSS (High Speed Sync) flash mode was now supported, allowing fill flash at shutter speeds greater than the X-sync speed by the use of many repeated small flashes of the electronic flashgun. This mode could be used from 1/360 to the camera's shortest 1/8000 of a second shutter speed. Also improved was the use of fill-flash at slower shutter speeds and wider apertures, by enabling lower-power illumination modes on modern Metz equipment. The manual flash exposure compensation ability in Program mode was improved, and AE lock was now possible in all automated modes.

== Accessories ==
Leica sold a number of dedicated accessories for the R8 and R9. In addition to the Digital Modul R, these comprise the following:

- Motor-Winder R8/R9: gives powered film transport (loading/advance/rewind) and continuous 2 frame/s shooting. It affixes to the camera's base, adding 20 mm in height, and replaces the right handgrip as well, this containing the two CR-123 lithium batteries it uses. A switch enables leader-out rewinds. An additional battery pack may be affixed to the base for extended use. This winder is much lighter and more compact than the previous version, the combination of R8 + Winder is almost exactly the same overall size and weight as the previous equivalent R7 + Winder
- Motor-Drive R8/R9: like the Motor-Winder, but larger and gives continuous 4.5 frame/s shooting in addition to single-shot and 2 frame/s. It provides additional shutter releases ― on the handgrip and on the vertical grip on the base. Enables three-shot auto-bracketing of exposure in 0.5 or 1 EV increments.
- Remote Control R8/R9: an electronic unit that attaches to either the Motor Winder or the Motor Drive; it cannot be connected to the bare camera. In addition to triggering the shutter, the Remote Control can turn the camera on or off, control mode and exposure, control auto-bracketing, and can function as an intervalometer triggering at rates between one per second and one every 24 hours. It comes with a 5-metre cord and can be fitted with up to 4 25 metre extension cords for a maximum length of 105 metres.
- Electric trigger switches: If the functionality of the Remote Control is not needed and all that is required is to trip the shutter, two electric trigger switches are available; one with a 5-metre cord that can also take extension cords, and one with a 0.3 metre cord for shake-free trigger release on a tripod.
- SF 24D flash: Leica's dedicated flash unit enables camera-controlled TTL flash output on the R8 and R9. Covers the field of view of 35–85 mm lenses (with diffusers, 24–135 mm).
- Focusing screens: the standard focusing screen, ground-glass with split-image and microprism collar, can be replaced by any of five other screens for specialised tasks. For the Digital Modul R, an additional set of six screens marked with the Modul R's sensor crop area can be substituted.
- Other accessories from Leica include a rubber eyecup, right-angle finder, diopter correction lenses, cases, straps, tripods, cable releases etc.

=== Digital Modul R ===
The Digital Modul R (DMR, styled in all caps as DIGITAL-MODUL-R) is an attachment which replaces the R8 or R9 camera's back and converts it to a digital camera. The sensor provides 10-megapixel resolution (3872×2576 pixels) with a 26.4×17.6 mm (1.04×0.69 in) imaging area, resulting in a crop factor of 1.36×. This is similar in size to the APS-H sensor fitted to the Canon 1D and Kodak DCS 660/760. In addition to the replacement back, the DMR includes a power supply which threads onto the base of the camera; combined, the R8/R9+DMR is approximately the same size and weight as the film SLR with the Motor-Drive R8/R9. As initially announced in 2003, the DMR was developed in conjunction with Imacon and uses a Kodak-sourced CCD sensor. Prototypes were available by 2004 and production units began shipping in 2006.

== End of the R series ==
On Wednesday, 4 March 2009, Leica announced via the L-Newsletter that no further stock was available and production of the R series cameras and accessories had ended.

== Specifications ==
| Camera type | 35 mm single-lens reflex |
| Lens mount | Leica R bayonet with additional electrical contacts ("ROM contacts"). |
| Operating modes | Manual, Aperture priority, Shutter priority, Program, and Flash. |
| Metering methods | Selective (7mm central area), 6-element matrix, center-weighted, and flash TTL center-weighted |
| Exposure lock | By light press on shutter release |
| Exposure compensation | Plus or minus three stops in half-stop increments, using lever on left side of the eyepiece |
| Film speed range | Automatic DX coding ISO 25 through 5000; manual ISO 6 through 12,800 |
| Metering range | 0.007–125,000 cd/m³ (EV −4 through EV 20) |
| Electrical power | 6 volts (2 × CR2 lithium battery) |
| Flash synchronisation | Hotshoe center contact or external synch socket; first or second curtain sync, as well as strobe (multiple flashes)View |
| Flash X-sync | 1/250 second or slower |
| TTL flash metering compatibility | Leica dedicated units and Metz units with Metz SCA 3501 adapter |
| Viewfinder coverage | 93% |
| Viewfinder magnification | 0.75× with 50 mm lens |
| Self timer | 2 sec or 12 sec |
| Mirror pre-release | Selectable via switch; first shutter release press activates mirror, second activates shutter |
| Frame counter | In viewfinder and on rear cover LCD |
| Multiple exposures | Unlimited, with multiple exposure switch on body |
| Construction | Cast zinc top plate, aluminum frame, synthetic base, rubber bottom |
| Dimensions | Width: 158 mm; Height: 101 mm; Depth: 62 mm |
| Weight | 890 g |

== See also ==
Media related to Leica R8 at Wikimedia Commons Media related to Leica R9 at Wikimedia Commons

- Leica R3
- Leica R4–R7
- Leica R
- Leica R bayonet

| Model | 1960s | | | | | | | | | | 1970s | | | | | | | | | | 1980s | | | | | | | | | | 1990s | | | | | | | | | | 2000s | | | | | | | | | |
| Model | 60 | 61 | 62 | 63 | 64 | 65 | 66 | 67 | 68 | 69 | 70 | 71 | 72 | 73 | 74 | 75 | 76 | 77 | 78 | 79 | 80 | 81 | 82 | 83 | 84 | 85 | 86 | 87 | 88 | 89 | 90 | 91 | 92 | 93 | 94 | 95 | 96 | 97 | 98 | 99 | 00 | 01 | 02 | 03 | 04 | 05 | 06 | 07 | 08 | 09 |
| Leicaflex | | | | | Leicaflex | | | | SL | | | | | SL2 | | | | | | | | | | | | | | | | | | | | | | | | | | | | | | | | | | | | |
| Leica R | | | | | | | | | | | | | | | | | R3 | | | | R4 | | | | | | R5 | R6 | | | | R7 | | | | | R8 | | | | | | R9 | | | | | | | |
