= Leica R4–R7 =

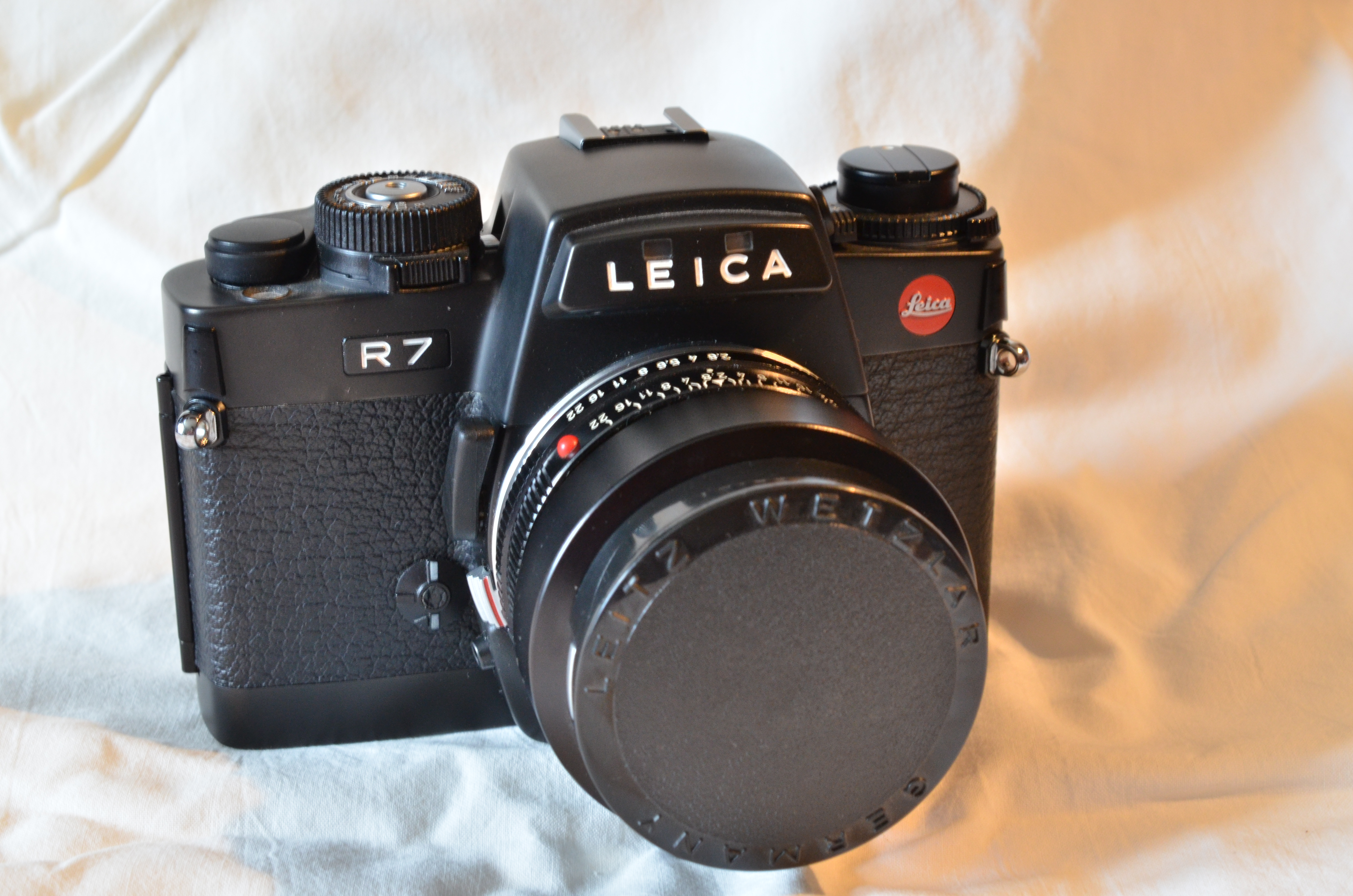
- Black Leica R7

Overview
- Maker: Leica
- Type: 35 mm SLR
- Released: 1980 Leica R4; 1987 Leica R5; 1988 Leica R6; 1992 Leica R7.
- Production: 1980–1997

Lens
- Lens mount: Leica R mount

Sensor/medium
- Film format: 35 mm
- Film size: 36 mm × 24 mm

Focusing
- Focus: Manual focus

Exposure/metering
- Exposure: Shutter, Aperture priority autoexposure; manual

Flash
- Flash: Hot shoe and PC terminal

General
- Dimensions: 51 × 86 × 136 mm, 560 g
- Made in: Germany, Portugal

Chronology
- Predecessor: Leica R3
- Successor: Leica R8–R9

Leica R4, R5, R6, R7 were 35 mm SLR cameras manufactured by Leica between 1980 and 1997 and belonged to the manual focusing R-System, which was offered from 1976 to 2009.

Following the success of the Leica R3 the company, in continuing cooperation with Minolta, produced the R4–R7 series all based on the same chassis.

== History ==
=== R4 / R4s /R4sp ===
The Leica R4 was made from 1980 to 1986.

Based on Minolta XD-7 (sold as XD in Japan and XD-11 in the USA) but with Leica developed exposure metering, mirror box, and newly designed body, the R4 followed the trend setting Olympus OM-1 and was much smaller and lighter than all earlier Leica SLR cameras. Like previous models the R4 offered selective metering and viewfinder information was comprehensive showing metering / exposure mode, shutter and aperture settings, exposure level, and flash ready.

The R4S (S stood for Simplified) and the R4SP (SP stood for Simplifed Professional) were simplified versions of the R4.

Five exposure / metering modes were available:

- Manual exposure / selective metering;
- Aperture priority semi automatic exposure / selective metering with exposure lock;
- Aperture priority semi automatic exposure / integrated (centre weighted) metering;
- Shutter priority semi automatic exposure / integrated (centre weighted) metering;
- Program automatic exposure / integrated (centre weighted) metering.

A rotary dial selected the mode, changing between integrated & selective metering was effected by a small lens moving in front of the meter cell which was mounted in the camera base like previous models, but moved forward and angled towards the film plane. This was to allow the same cell to measure both selective and full field for which the secondary mirror was larger than earlier cameras. Selective metering measured from the central focussing area only, a circle about seven mm of the viewfinder image.

Offered from 1983 the R4s was a lower cost model with reduced features lacking shutter priority and program modes, however incorporating some improvements to the controls.

Automated flash control was not provided but flash ready was indicated in the viewfinder by suitable flash units which also selected flash synchronisation speed 1/100 s.

The camera was assembled by the Leica factory in Portugal. Early production R4 cameras suffered from electronic failures which marred the reputation of Leica for reliability.

=== R5 / RE ===
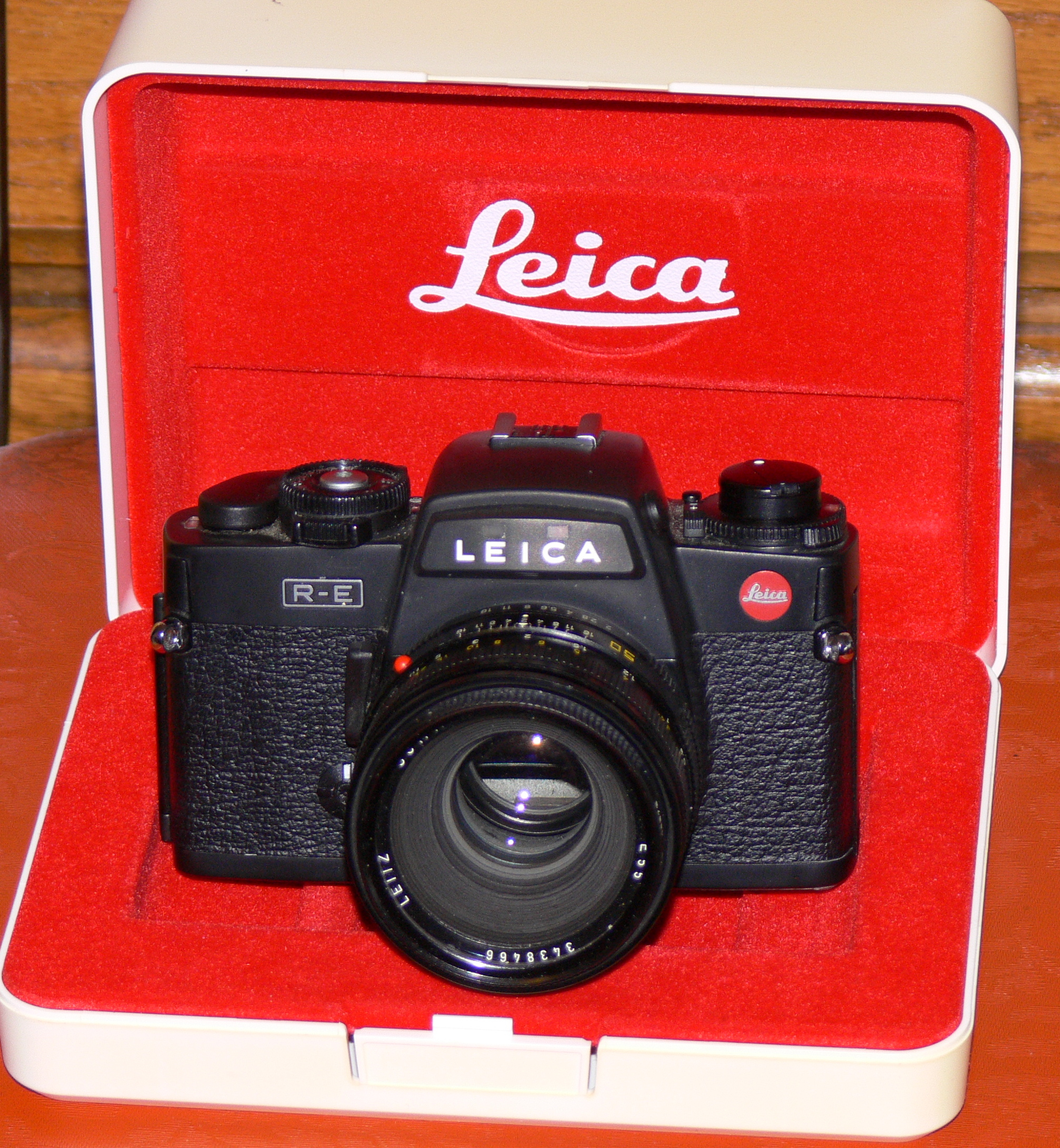
Leica R-E

Introduced in 1987 the R5 offered variable program mode and, more importantly, automatic TTL flash exposure measurement for the first time in a Leica camera along with control improvements of the R4s. Flash metering required a second light receptor in the base and measured full field only off the film itself during exposure. Other improvements included a faster shutter speed of 1/2000 s (compared to 1/1000 s on the R4) and a true high-eyepoint viewfinder with diopter correction. The brightness of the focusing screens has also been increased significantly, to the level of Minolta's infamous "Acute Matte" screens. In comparison to the earlier models of the R4, its upgraded successor R5 proved to be a very reliable and well-received SLR camera, although manual focusing was already considered obsolete by the time it appeared, as most other SLR manufacturers switched to newly-developed autofocus systems during the late 1980s.

The R-E was, like the earlier R4s, a lower cost reduced feature version with final assembly in Solms, Germany. All subsequent R series cameras were assembled in Solms, however the factory in Portugal continued to produce sub assemblies and accessories.

== R6 / R6.2 ==
The Leica R6 was made from 1988 to 1992. It used a mechanical shutter, relied on battery power only for the built-in light meter.

The R6 is manual exposure only, with a Leica developed and manufactured mechanical shutter. Aimed at professional photographers and significantly more expensive than the R5, the R6 depended on batteries only for two functions: exposure metering and the electronic self-timer, everything else could be used without power. Meter modes were selective and integrated (centre weighted) including TTL flash exposure. Viewfinder backlighting was provided which also illuminated the aperture setting.

The R6.2 was made from 1992 to 1997 and offered a higher shutter speed (1/2000 s).

=== R7 ===
Introduced in 1992 the R7 offered complete flash automation. In program mode flash control was fully automatic, selected as necessary by the camera - full flash in dark conditions, fill in flash with ambient light, flash off in bright conditions. In any mode flash ready would select flash synchronisation shutter speed.

This was the first Leica microprocessor controlled camera, viewfinder display of shutter speed was digital with backlighting.

Additional electronics were necessary and the R7 had a deeper base plate to accommodate the extra circuit making the camera taller than the R4/R5/R6 and necessitating a special taller grip for the winder and motor drive.

== See also ==
- Leica R3
- Leica R8–R9
- Leica R
- Leica R bayonet

Model	1960s										1970s										1980s										1990s										2000s									
Model	60	61	62	63	64	65	66	67	68	69	70	71	72	73	74	75	76	77	78	79	80	81	82	83	84	85	86	87	88	89	90	91	92	93	94	95	96	97	98	99	00	01	02	03	04	05	06	07	08	09
Leicaflex					Leicaflex				SL					SL2																																				
Leica R																	R3				R4						R5	R6				R7					R8						R9							
