= Leica R bayonet =

Camera lens mount system

Leica R-mount
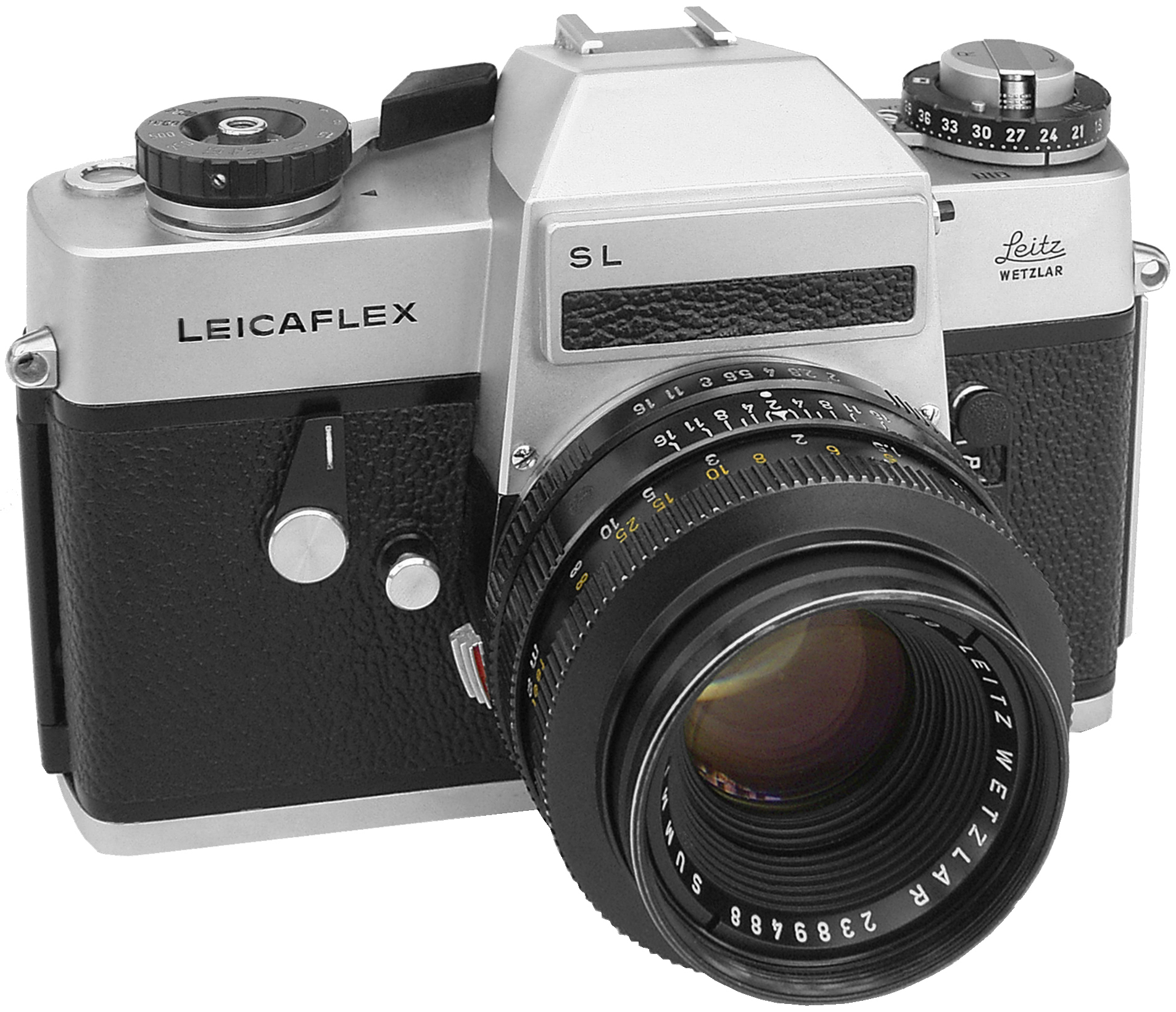
- A Leicaflex SL and R mount 50 mm lens
- Type: Bayonet
- Tabs: 3
- Flange: 47 mm
- Connectors: Electrical contacts for lens properties on later models

The Leica R bayonet mount is a camera lens mount system introduced by Leitz in 1964. The R mount is the standard method of connecting a lens to the Leica R series of 35 mm single-lens reflex cameras.

== History ==
The mount is descended from those used for the Leicaflex (1964), Leicaflex SL (1968), and Leicaflex SL2 (1974) SLR cameras, but differs in the cams used to communicate lens aperture information to the camera. 3 cam lenses are compatible with all of the Leica SLR cameras, while R-only lenses have a slightly different mount shape that will not fit on the earlier cameras.

On 5 March 2009, Leica announced plans to cease production of its R-Series manual focus SLR and lenses.

== Technical ==
Leica R bayonet mount

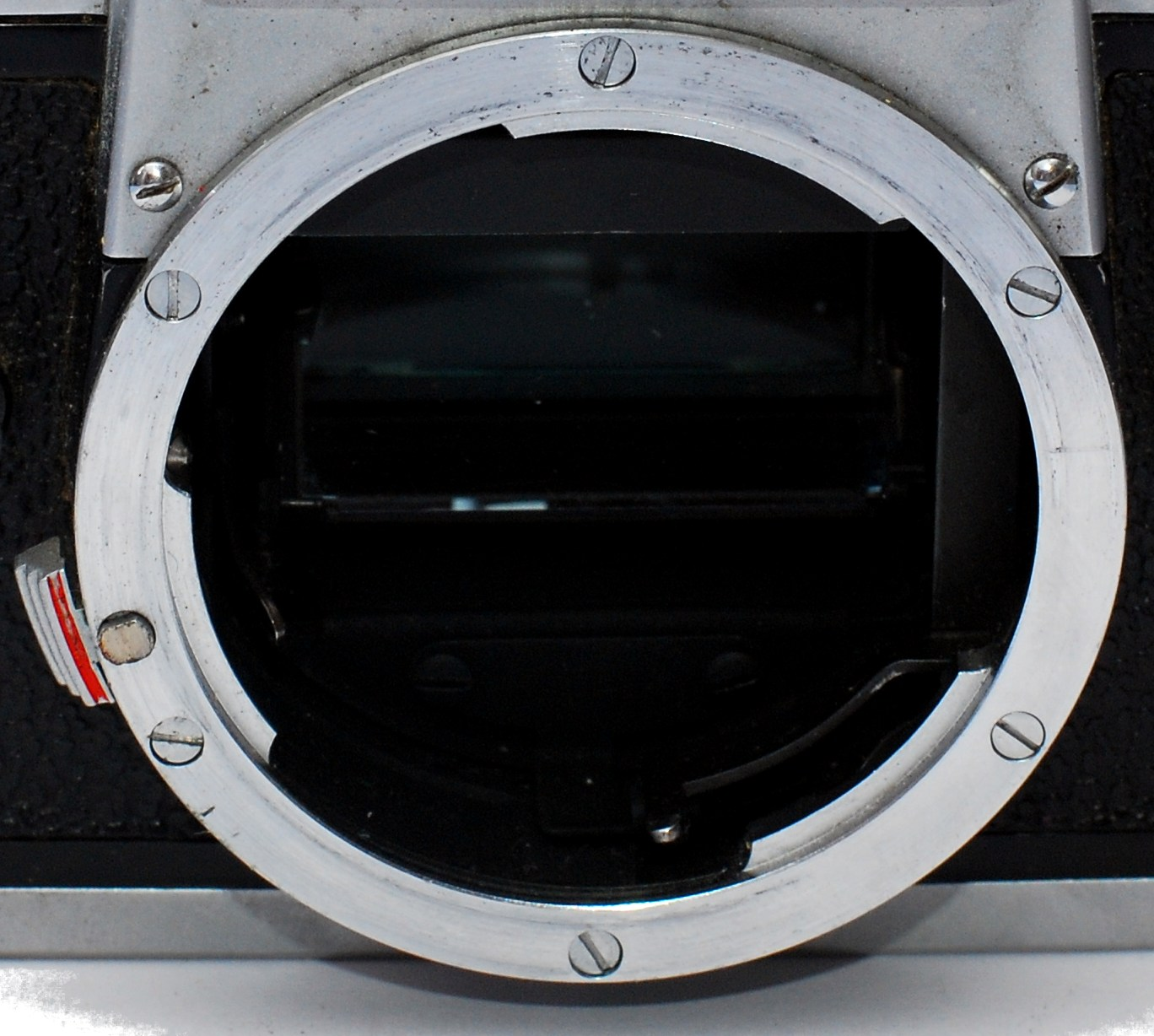
Camera-side mount (Leicaflex SL)

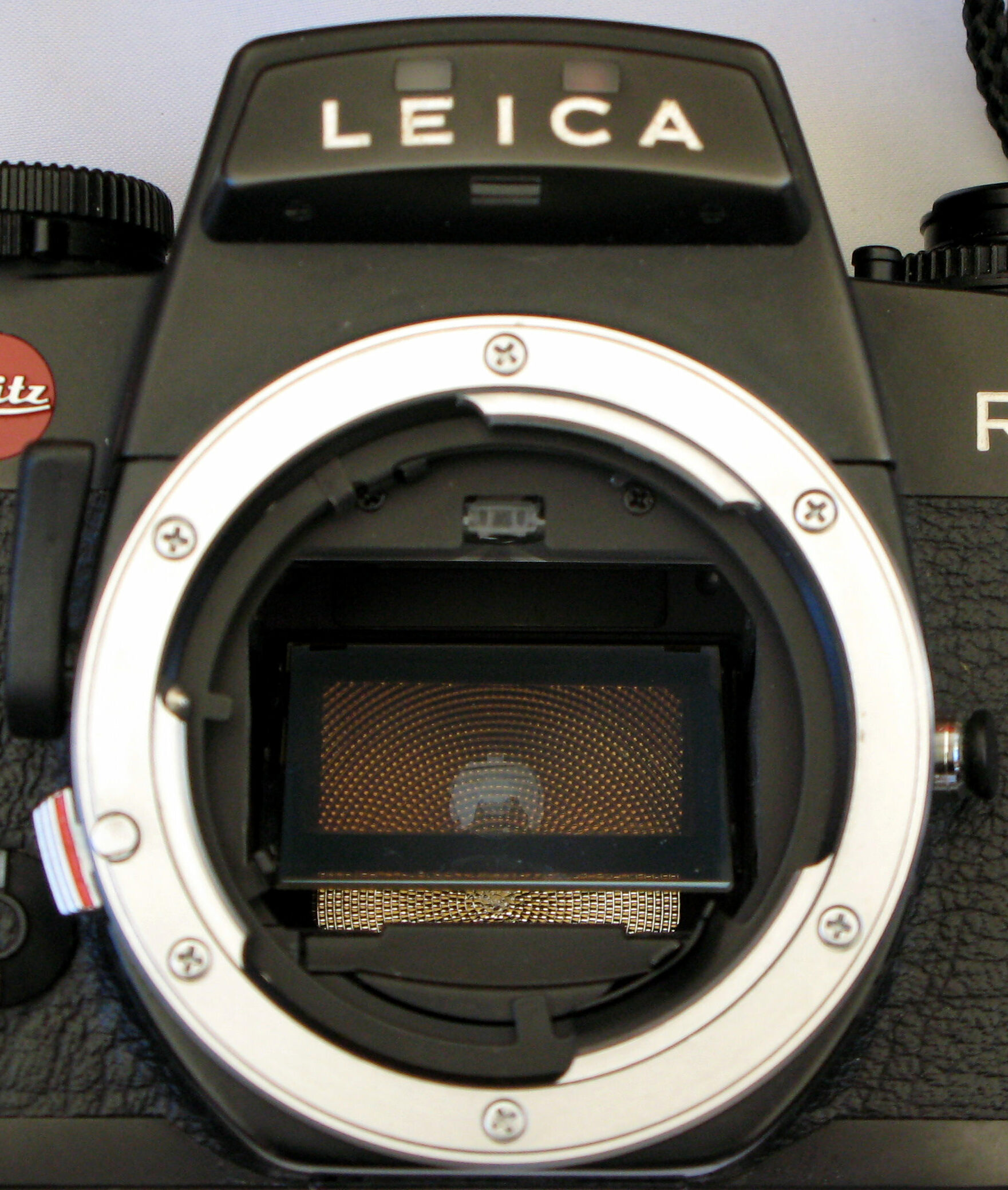
Camera-side mount (Leica R4)

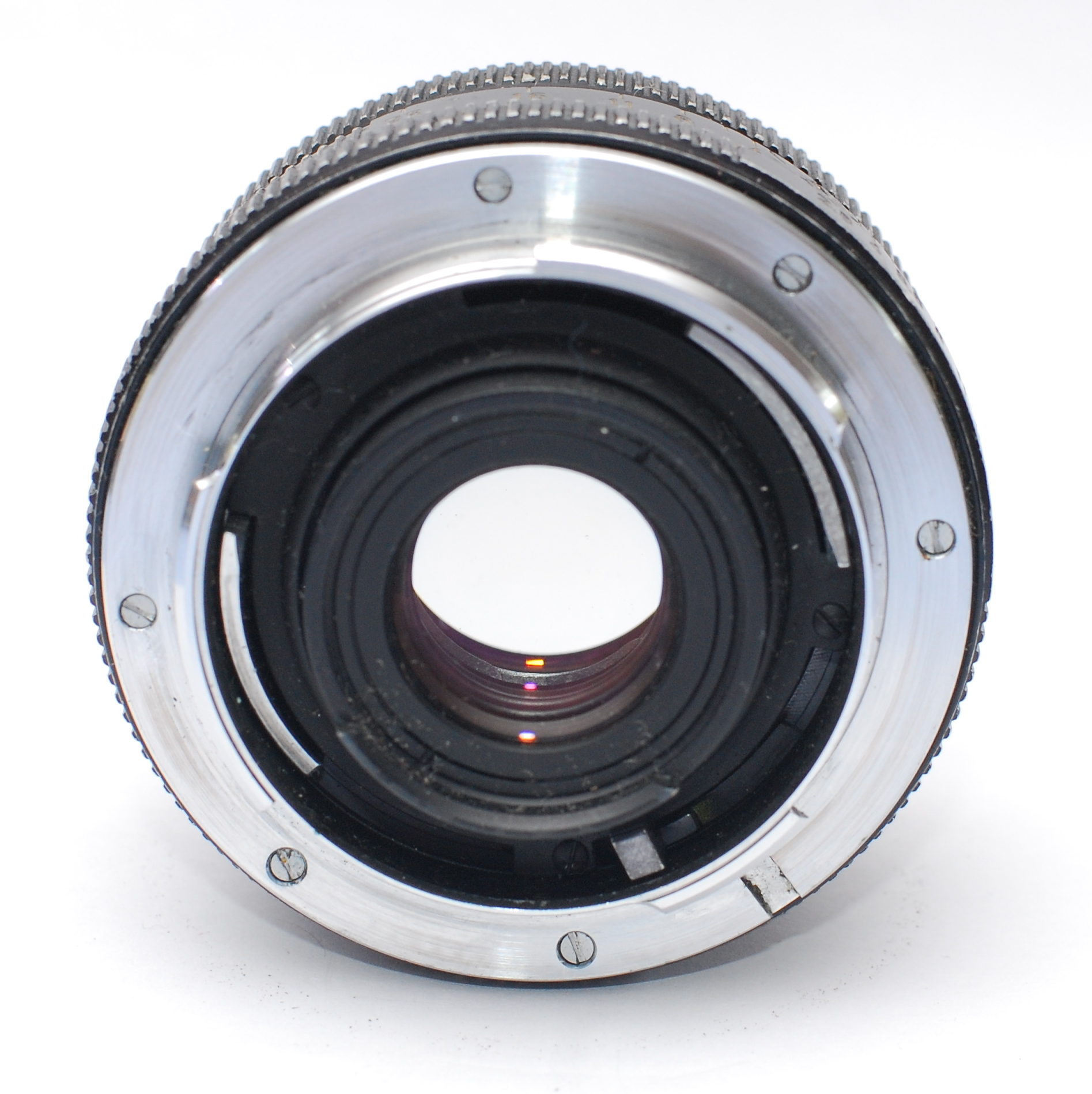
Lens-side mount (2-cam Elmarit-R 28 mm f/2.8)

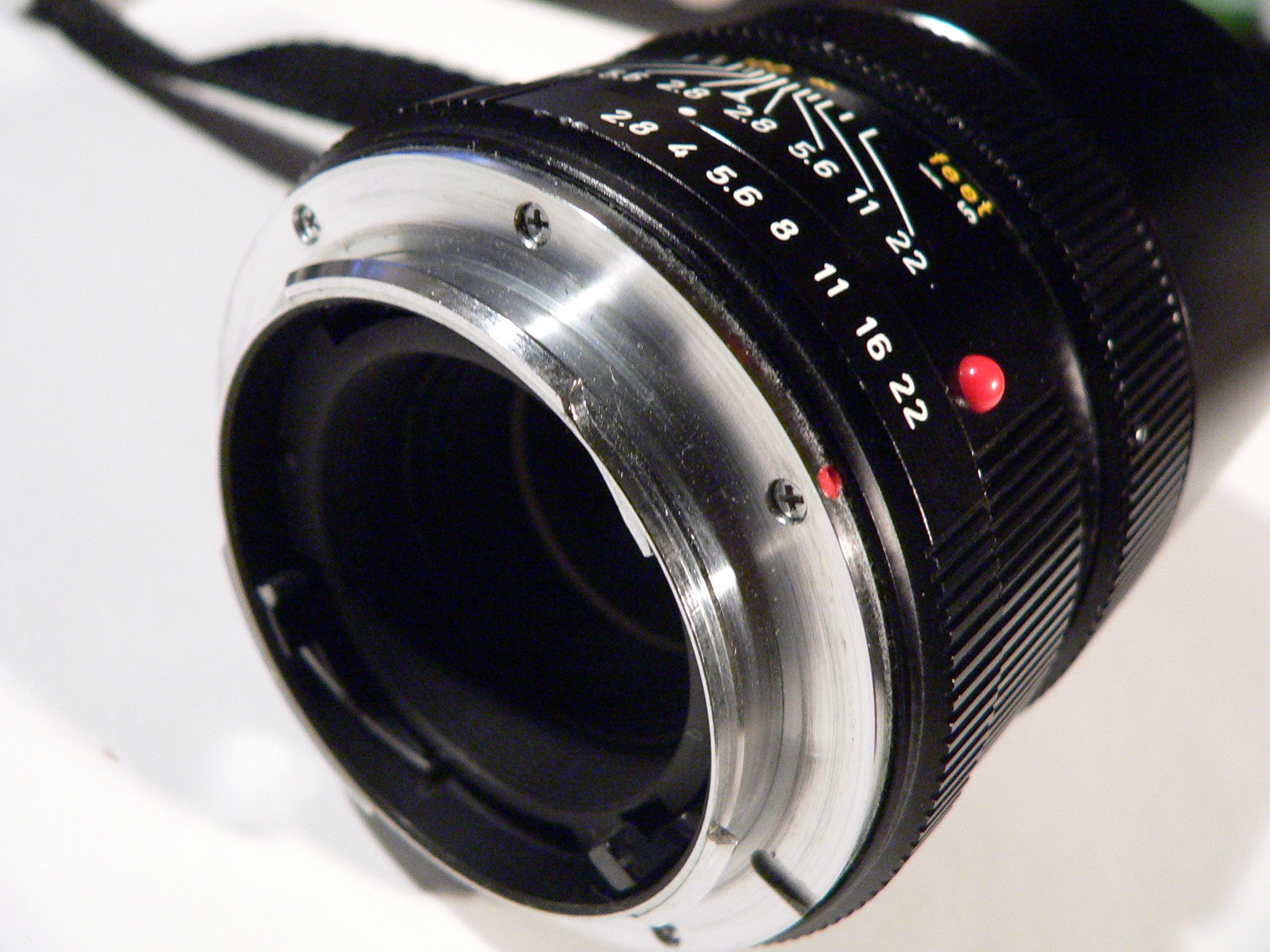
Lens-side mount (3-cam Elmarit-R 135 mm f/2.8)

The flange focal distance between mount and film is 47 mm.

Looking at the camera body from the front, the bayonet locking pin is at the 8 o'clock position alongside the stepped plunger button. At the rear of the lens, the corresponding locking slot is at the 4 o'clock position. The automatic diaphragm lever is next to the locking slot, Cam 1 is at the 12 o'clock position, and Cams 2 and 3 are at the 6 o'clock position.

== R Mount camera bodies ==
=== Leicaflex ===
Image	Name	Year	Exposure modes				Notes
Image	Name	Year	M	A	S	P	Notes
	Leicaflex	1964–1968	Yes	No	No	No	• The first R mount SLR camera
	Leicaflex SL	1968–1974	Yes, TTL	No	No	No	• "SL" standing for selective light
	Leicaflex SL2	1974–1976	Yes, TTL	No	No	No	• More sensitive exposure meter and changes to the mirror hinging for wide angle lenses

=== Leica R ===
Image	Name	Year	Exposure modes				Notes
Image	Name	Year	M	A	S	P	Notes
	Leica R3	1976–1979	Yes	Yes	No	No	• Developed in cooperation with Minolta. • Based on the Minolta XE.
	Leica R4	1980–1986	Yes	Yes	Yes	Yes	• Based on the Minolta Minolta XD-7.
	Leica R5	1986–1991	Yes	Yes	Yes	Yes	• Automatic TTL flash exposure measurement
	Leica R6	1987–1996	Yes, TTL	No	No	No	• Mechanical shutter, relied on battery power only for the built-in light meter.
	Leica R7	1991–1996	Yes	Yes	Yes	Yes	• Complete flash automation.
	Leica R8	1996–2002	Yes	Yes	Yes	Yes	• Intended as a clean break from the previous generation of Leica R cameras and designed in house. • Flash pre exposure measurement
	Leica R9	2002–2009	Yes	Yes	Yes	Yes	• Electronic changes included the ability to tune the sensitivity of matrix metering. • Flash pre exposure measurement

== R mount lenses ==
R-mount lenses feature up to three mechanical cams which engage levers in the camera body. The earliest style of lens, also known as 1-cam or single cam, uses a single sloped cam which communicates the aperture setting to the camera, which is used by the original Leicaflex. Single cam lenses were discontinued in 1968 when the SL (and later SL2) were released; a second sloped cam was added to the lenses which communicated the aperture setting to the through-the-lens meter, while the first cam served to display the aperture setting in the viewfinder. 2-cam lenses were made until 1976.

With the introduction of the R series cameras (R3, R4, etc.), a third stepped cam was introduced just inboard of the second sloped cam; usually, the lens had all three cams, but the R series cameras used only the third cam. 3-cam lenses were made until 1988, with the introduction of R-only lenses, and ROM contacts were introduced in 1996, which replaced cam 1 with a series of electrical contacts.

R mount lens variations
Lens style	Years	Features				In-camera meter compatibility				Notes
Lens style	Years	Cam 1	Cam 2	R-cam	ROM	Leicaflex	SL/SL2	R3–R7	R8/R9	Notes
1 cam	1964–1968	Yes	No	No	No	Yes, full aperture	stop-down		stop-down, may damage contacts	The original Leicaflex 1 cam lenses have a single sloped cam that communicates aperture setting to the camera. They can be used on later SL / SL2 and R-series cameras in stop-down metering mode only. Leica do not recommend that 1 cam lenses be used on R8 or R9 cameras because of possible damage to the cameras' ROM contacts. 1 cam lenses may be fitted with later 2 cams, 3 cams, or R cam + ROM contacts (replacing the sloped cams).
2 cam	1968–1976	Yes	Yes	No	No	Yes, full aperture	Yes, full aperture	stop-down	stop-down, may damage contacts	2 cam lenses have two sloped cams for the Leicaflex SL and SL2 with TTL metering and are fully compatible with the original Leicaflex. They can be used on R series cameras with the same limitation and warning as 1 cam lenses and may also be fitted with later cams.
3 cam	1976–1988	Yes	Yes	Yes	No	Yes, full aperture	Yes, full aperture	Yes, full aperture		3 cam lenses were introduced with R series cameras and have the earlier sloped cams and a third stepped "R-Cam" that communicates aperture information. They will work with all Leica SLR models since they have all three mechanical connections.
R only	1988–1996	No	No	Yes	No	No, not compatible		Yes, full aperture		These lenses only have the stepped R-cam and only work on R-series cameras. The mount is deliberately slightly incompatible with Leicaflex models and will not fit. They may be converted to ROM by a technician.
ROM	1996–	No	No	Yes	Yes	No, not compatible		Yes, full aperture	Yes, full aperture + ROM data	These only have the stepped R-cam plus electrical contacts communicating focal length to the camera. This is only supported on the R8/R9 although the lenses are fully compatible with all R-series cameras. The additional information is used in flash metering and communicated to the flash unit where it can be used to set power and flash zoom correctly and also to the optional Digital Module allowing lens focal length to be recorded with other image data. Earlier 1, 2, or 3 cam lenses may be upgraded to ROM but this entails removal of both sloped cams, meaning that the lens will no longer be compatible with Leicaflex series cameras.

=== Use with other cameras ===
The flange focal distance of 47 mm is fairly large, meaning that few other systems' lenses can be adapted to fit on a Leica R and retain infinity focus, but R lenses can be converted to other systems. The distance is only 0.5 mm larger than the Nikon F-mount, which is not sufficient to make a workable adapter, however, at least one Nikon camera has been modified with a Leica R bayonet mount to take R lenses, and at least two manufacturers make replacement mounts, allowing many Leica R lenses to be used directly on various camera systems, such as Nikon F mount cameras. For this purpose, the cams need to be removed, which is not always possible (e.g. early Elmarit-R f/2.8 35mm). The mounting flange may then need to be machined to allow free movement of the remaining cam. Sometimes, it is wise to refit the inner black anti-reflection ring, to avoid reflections within the focus mechanism (e.g. Elmarit-R f/2.8 90mm or Elmarit-R f/2.8 135mm). A further point of consideration is whether the protrusion on the rear lens block will engage with the mirror of the target SLR. For some Nikon cameras, this may be an issue.

Chips can also be attached to provide focal length and maximum aperture recognition in the camera body, which provides Exif in digital cameras.

A number of manufacturers have produced adapters to allow Canon EOS cameras to take R lenses, these operate only in stop-down metering mode but function well when rapid operation is not required.

Leica R mount lenses
Name	FL	Ap.	Const.	Min. focus	Angle	Filter	Years	Φ×L	Wgt.	Code	Notes
Fisheye and ultra wide angle lenses
Super-Elmar-R	15	f/3.5–22	13e/12g	0.16 m (6.3 in)	111°	built-in	1980−1996	83.5×92.5 mm (3.29×3.64 in)	910 g (32 oz)	11213 11315-ROM	Zeiss design
Fisheye-Elmarit-R	16	f/2.8–16	11e/8g	0.3 m (1 ft 0 in)	180°	built-in	1974−2009	71×60 mm (2.8×2.4 in)	460 g (16 oz)	11222 11327-ROM	Minolta design
Elmarit-R	19	f/2.8–16	9e/7g	0.5 m (1 ft 8 in)	97°	82	1975−1990	88×60 mm (3.5×2.4 in)	500 g (18 oz)	11225	Retrofocus
Elmarit-R	19	f/2.8–22	12e/10g	0.3 m (1 ft 0 in)	97°	built-in	1991−2009	71×60 mm (2.8×2.4 in)	560 g (20 oz)	11258 11329-ROM	
Super-Angulon-R	21	f/3.4–22	8e/4g	0.2 m (7.9 in)	92°	Ser.8	1964−1968	1×22 mm (0.039×0.866 in)	230 g (8.1 oz)	11803	Schneider design, Leicaflex only (requires mirror lock-up)
Super-Angulon-R	21	f/4–22	10e/8g	0.2 m (7.9 in)	92°	Ser.8.5	1968−1994	78×43.5 mm (3.07×1.71 in)	410 g (14 oz)	11813	Schneider design, retrofocus
Wide-angle lenses
Elmarit-R	24	f/2.8–22	9e/7g	0.3 m (1 ft 0 in)	84°	Ser.8	1974−2009	67×48.5 mm (2.64×1.91 in)	400 g (14 oz)	11221 11257 11331-ROM 11333-ROM	Minolta design
Elmarit-R	28	f/2.8–22	8e/8g	0.3 m (1 ft 0 in)	75°	48	1970−1994	63×40 mm (2.5×1.6 in)	275 g (9.7 oz)	11204 11247	
Elmarit-R	28	f/2.8–22	8e/7g	0.3 m (1 ft 0 in)	75°	55	1994−2009	63×40 mm (2.5×1.6 in)	310 g (11 oz)	11259 11333-ROM	
PC-Super-Angulon-R	28	f/2.8–22	12e/10g	0.3 m (1 ft 0 in)	75°	67EW	1988−2009	75×84 mm (3.0×3.3 in)	565 g (19.9 oz)	11812	Schneider design
Vario-Elmar-R	28~70	f/3.5~4.5–22	11e/8g	0.5 m (1 ft 8 in)	34~75°	60	1990−2009	74.8×74.5 mm (2.94×2.93 in)	468 g (16.5 oz)	11265 11364-ROM	Sigma design
Summilux-R	35	f/1.4–16	10e/9g	0.5 m (1 ft 8 in)	63°	67	1984−2009	75×76 mm (3.0×3.0 in)	690 g (24 oz)	11143 11144 11337-ROM	
Summicron-R	35	f/2.0–16	9e/7g	0.3 m (1 ft 0 in)	63°	E48/ Ser.7	1972−1976	66×61 mm (2.6×2.4 in)	525 g (18.5 oz)	11227	
Summicron-R	35	f/2.0–16	6e/6g	0.3 m (1 ft 0 in)	63°	55	1977−2009	66×54 mm (2.6×2.1 in)	430 g (15 oz)	11115	
Summicron-R	35	f/2.0–16	6e/6g	0.3 m (1 ft 0 in)	63°	60	1997−2009	66×54 mm (2.6×2.1 in)	430 g (15 oz)	11339-ROM	
Elmarit-R	35	f/2.8–22	7e/6g	0.3 m (1 ft 0 in)	63°	Ser.6	1964−1974	63×41 mm (2.5×1.6 in)	400 g (14 oz)	11101	
Elmarit-R	35	f/2.8–22	7e/6g	0.3 m (1 ft 0 in)	63°	48/ Ser.7	1974−1979	63×40 mm (2.5×1.6 in)	410 g (14 oz)	11201	
Elmarit-R	35	f/2.8–22	7e/6g	0.3 m (1 ft 0 in)	63°	55	1979−1996	66×41.5 mm (2.60×1.63 in)	305 g (10.8 oz)	11231 11251	
PC-Curtagon-R	35	f/4.0–22	7e/6g	0.3 m (1 ft 0 in)	63°	Ser.8	1969−1996	70×51 mm (2.8×2.0 in)	290 g (10 oz)	11202	Schneider design
Vario-Elmarit-R Asph	35~70	f/2.8–22	11e/9g	0.7 m (2 ft 4 in)	34~63°	77	1998−2001	88×133 mm (3.5×5.2 in)	1,050 g (37 oz)	11275-ROM	
Vario-Elmar-R	35~70	f/3.5–22	8e/7g	1.0 m (3 ft 3 in)	34~63°	60	1983−1988	76.5×66.5 mm (3.01×2.62 in)	450 g (16 oz)	11244	Minolta design
Vario-Elmar-R	35~70	f/3.5–22	8e/7g	1.0 m (3 ft 3 in)	34~63°	67	1988−1997	76.5×66.5 mm (3.01×2.62 in)	450 g (16 oz)	11248	Minolta design
Vario-Elmar-R	35~70	f/4.0–22	8e/7g	0.6 m (2 ft 0 in)	34~63°	60	1997−2009	62×79 mm (2.4×3.1 in)	505 g (17.8 oz)	11277-ROM	
Normal lenses
Angenieux-Zoom-R	45~90	f/2.8–22	15e/12g	1.0 m (3 ft 3 in)	27~51°	67/ Ser.8	1969−1982	69×122 mm (2.7×4.8 in)	774 g (27.3 oz)	98000	Angenieux design
Summilux-R	50	f/1.4–16	7e/6g	0.5 m (1 ft 8 in)	47°	Ser.7	1969−1978	67×47 mm (2.6×1.9 in)	460 g (16 oz)	11875	
Summilux-R	50	f/1.4–16	7e/6g	0.5 m (1 ft 8 in)	47°	55	1978−1998	66.5×50.6 mm (2.62×1.99 in)	400 g (14 oz)	11778 11777	Also sold as R-only
Summilux-R	50	f/1.4–16	8e/7g	0.5 m (1 ft 8 in)	47°	60	1998−2009	70×51 mm (2.8×2.0 in)	490 g (17 oz)	11344-ROM	
Summicron-R	50	f/2.0–16	6e/5g	0.5 m (1 ft 8 in)	47°	Ser.6	1964−1976	67×38.5 mm (2.64×1.52 in)	340 g (12 oz)	11228	
Summicron-R	50	f/2.0–16	6e/4g	0.5 m (1 ft 8 in)	47°	55	1976−2009	66×41 mm (2.6×1.6 in)	290 g (10 oz)	11215 11216 11345-ROM	
Macro-Elmarit-R	60	f/2.8–22	6e/5g	0.27 m (11 in)	40°	Ser.7	1972−1980	67.5×67 mm (2.66×2.64 in)	450 g (16 oz)	11203	
Macro-Elmarit-R	60	f/2.8–22	6e/5g	0.27 m (11 in)	40°	55	1980−2009	67.5×62.3 mm (2.66×2.45 in)	400 g (14 oz)	11212 11253 11347-ROM	
Portrait lenses
Vario-APO-Elmarit-R	70~180	f/2.8–22	13e/10g	1.7 m (5 ft 7 in)	14~34°	77	1995−2009	89×189.5 mm (3.50×7.46 in)	1,870 g (66 oz)	11279-ROM	
Vario-Elmar-R	70~210	f/4.0–22	12e/9g	1.1 m (3 ft 7 in)	12~34°	60	1984−1996	73.5×157 mm (2.89×6.18 in)	720 g (25 oz)	11246	Minolta design
Vario-Elmar-R	75~200	f/4.5–22	15e/11g	1.2 m (3 ft 11 in)	12~32°	55	1978−1984	70×157 mm (2.8×6.2 in)	725 g (25.6 oz)	11226	Minolta design
Summilux-R	80	f/1.4–16	7e/5g	0.8 m (2 ft 7 in)	30°	67	1980−2009	75×69 mm (3.0×2.7 in)	700 g (25 oz)	11880 11881 11349-ROM	
Vario-Elmar-R	80~200	f/4.0–22	12e/8g	1.1 m (3 ft 7 in)	12~30°	60	1996−2009	71×165 mm (2.8×6.5 in)	1,020 g (36 oz)	11280 11281-ROM	
Vario-Elmar-R	80~200	f/4.5–22	14e/10g	1.8 m (5 ft 11 in)	12~30°	55	1974−1978	71×157 mm (2.8×6.2 in)	710 g (25 oz)	11224	Minolta design
Summicron-R	90	f/2.0–16	5e/4g	0.7 m (2 ft 4 in)	27°	Ser.7	1969−1987	75×62.5 mm (2.95×2.46 in)	560 g (20 oz)	11219	
Summicron-R	90	f/2.0–16	5e/4g	0.7 m (2 ft 4 in)	27°	55	1987−2009	69×61 mm (2.7×2.4 in)	560 g (20 oz)	11254	
Elmarit-R	90	f/2.8–22	5e/4g	0.7 m (2 ft 4 in)	27°	Ser.7	1964−1983	75×72 mm (3.0×2.8 in)	515 g (18.2 oz)	11229 11239	
Elmarit-R	90	f/2.8–22	4e/4g	0.7 m (2 ft 4 in)	27°	55	1980−2009	67×57 mm (2.6×2.2 in)	475 g (16.8 oz)	11806 11154	
Apo-Macro-Elmarit-R	100	f/2.8–22	8e/6g	0.45 m (1 ft 6 in)	24°	60	1987−2009	73×104.5 mm (2.87×4.11 in)	760 g (27 oz)	11210 11352-ROM	
Macro-Elmar-R	100	f/4.0–22	4e/3g	0.27 m (11 in)	24°	55	1978−1995	67.5×90 mm (2.66×3.54 in)	540 g (19 oz)	11232	
Macro-Elmar	100	f/4.0–22	4e/3g	—N/a	24°	55	1969−1997	68×62.5 mm (2.68×2.46 in)	365 g (12.9 oz)	11230 11270	Requires bellows
Vario-Elmar-R	105~280	f/4.2–22	13e/10g	1.1 m (3 ft 7 in)	8.8~23°	77	1996−2009	89×238 mm (3.5×9.4 in)	1,950 g (69 oz)	11268-ROM	
Elmarit-R	135	f/2.8–22	5e/4g	1.5 m (4 ft 11 in)	18°	Ser.7	1964−1968	67×91 mm (2.6×3.6 in)	730 g (26 oz)	11111	
Elmarit-R	135	f/2.8–22	5e/4g	1.5 m (4 ft 11 in)	18°	55	1968−1999	67×93 mm (2.6×3.7 in)	730 g (26 oz)	11211	
Telephoto lenses
Apo-Summicron-R	180	f/2.0–16	9e/6g	1.50 m (4 ft 11 in)	14°	Ser.6 (slot)	1994−2009	116×176 mm (4.6×6.9 in)	2,500 g (88 oz)	11271 11354-ROM	
Elmarit-R	180	f/2.8–16	5e/4g	2.00 m (6 ft 7 in)	14°	72/ Ser.8	1968−1979	75×134 mm (3.0×5.3 in)	1,325 g (46.7 oz)	11919	
Elmarit-R	180	f/2.8–22	5e/4g	1.80 m (5 ft 11 in)	14°	67	1979−1998	75×121 mm (3.0×4.8 in)	825 g (29.1 oz)	11923	
Apo-Elmarit-R	180	f/2.8–22	7e/5g	1.50 m (4 ft 11 in)	14°	67	1998−2009	76×132 mm (3.0×5.2 in)	972 g (34.3 oz)	11273-ROM	
Apo-Telyt-R	180	f/3.4–22	7e/4g	2.50 m (8 ft 2 in)	14°	60	1975−1998	68×135 mm (2.7×5.3 in)	750 g (26 oz)	11240 11242	Early lenses take Ser.7.5 filters
Elmar-R	180	f/4.0–22	5e/4g	1.80 m (5 ft 11 in)	14°	55	1976−1995	65.5×100 mm (2.58×3.94 in)	540 g (19 oz)	11922	
Telyt-R	250	f/4.0–22	6e/5g	4.50 m (14.8 ft)	10°	72/ Ser.8	1970−1979	75×154 mm (3.0×6.1 in)	1,410 g (50 oz)	11920	
Telyt-R	250	f/4.0–22	7e/6g	1.70 m (5 ft 7 in)	10°	67	1980−1994	75×195 mm (3.0×7.7 in)	1,230 g (43 oz)	11925	
Apo-Telyt-R	280	f/2.8–22	7e/4g	2.50 m (8 ft 2 in)	8.8°	112	1984−1992	125×261 mm (4.9×10.3 in)	2,750 g (97 oz)	11245	
Apo-Telyt-R	280	f/2.8–22	7e/4g	2.50 m (8 ft 2 in)	8.8°	Ser.5.5	1992−1996	125×261 mm (4.9×10.3 in)	2,800 g (99 oz)	11263	
Apo-Telyt-R	280	f/2.8–22	8e/7g	2.00 m (6 ft 7 in)	8.8°	Ser.6	1996−2009	125×276 mm (4.9×10.9 in)	3,700 g (130 oz)	11846	Modular system
Apo-Telyt-R	280	f/4.0–22	7e/6g	1.70 m (5 ft 7 in)	8.8°	77/ Ser.5	1993−2009	90×208 mm (3.5×8.2 in)	1,875 g (66.1 oz)	11261 11360-ROM	
Telyt-R	350	f/4.8–22	6e/5g	3.00 m (9.84 ft)	7.1°	77	1980−1994	83.5×286 mm (3.29×11.26 in)	1,820 g (64 oz)	11915	
Apo-Telyt-R	400	f/2.8–22	11e/9g	4.50 m (14.8 ft)	6.2°	Ser.5.5	1992−1996	80×365 mm (3.1×14.4 in)	5,500 g (190 oz)	11260	
Apo-Telyt-R	400	f/2.8–22	10e/8g	3.70 m (12.1 ft)	6.2°	Ser.6	1996−2009	157×344 mm (6.2×13.5 in)	5,900 g (210 oz)	11847	Modular system
Apo-Telyt-R	400	f/4.0–22	9e/7g	2.15 m (7 ft 1 in)	6.2°	Ser.6	1996−2009	125×314 mm (4.9×12.4 in)	3,800 g (130 oz)	11857	Modular system
Telyt-R	400	f/5.6–32	2e/1g	3.60 m (11.8 ft)	6.2°	Ser.7	1968−1971	80×390 mm (3.1×15.4 in)	2,350 g (83 oz)	14154	
Telyt-R	400	f/6.8–32	2e/1g	3.60 m (11.8 ft)	6.2°	Ser.7	1971−1990	78×384 mm (3.1×15.1 in)	1,830 g (65 oz)	11960 11969	
Telyt-R	400	f/6.8–32	2e/1g	2.40 m (7 ft 10 in)	6.2°	—N/a	1990−1996	80×406 mm (3.1×16.0 in)	2,930 g (103 oz)	11926	
MR-Telyt-R	500	f/8 (fixed)	6e/5g	4.0 m (13.1 ft)	5°	77	X	87×121 mm (3.4×4.8 in)	750 g (26 oz)	11243	Minolta design
Apo-Telyt-R	560	f/4.0–22	11e/8g	3.90 m (12.8 ft)	4.4°	Ser.6	1996−2009	157×382 mm (6.2×15.0 in)	6,000 g (210 oz)	11848	Modular system
Apo-Telyt-R	560	f/5.6–22	9e/7g	2.15 m (7 ft 1 in)	4.4°	Ser.6	1996−2009	125×374 mm (4.9×14.7 in)	3,950 g (139 oz)	11858	Modular system
Telyt-R	560	f/5.6–32	2e/1g	6.60 m (21.7 ft)	4.4°	Ser.7	1968−1971	98×536 mm (3.9×21.1 in)	3,455 g (121.9 oz)	14155	
Telyt-R	560	f/6.8–32	2e/1g	6.40 m (21.0 ft)	4.4°	Ser.7	1972−1996	98×530 mm (3.9×20.9 in)	2,330 g (82 oz)	11865	
Telyt-R	560	f/6.8–32	2e/1g	4.15 m (13.6 ft)	4.4°	—N/a	1990−1996	98×534 mm (3.9×21.0 in)	3,200 g (110 oz)	11927	
Apo-Telyt-R	800	f/5.6–22	11e/8g	3.90 m (12.8 ft)	3.1°	Ser.6	1996−2009	157×442 mm (6.2×17.4 in)	6,200 g (220 oz)	11849	Modular system
Telyt-S	800	f/6.3–22	3e/1g	12.5 m (41 ft)	3.1°	Ser.7	1973−1996	152×790 mm (6.0×31.1 in)	6,860 g (242 oz)	11921	
MR-Telyt-R	800	f/8.0	8e/7g	8.0 m (26.2 ft)	3.1°	?	1976−1978	152×166.5 mm (5.98×6.56 in)	1,800 g (63 oz)		Minolta design
Teleconverters
Apo-Extender-R 1.4x	1.4×	+1	5e/4g	same	approx. ÷1.4	—N/a	—N/a	62×36 mm (2.4×1.4 in)	220 g (7.8 oz)	11249	Compatible with most lenses ≥280mm
Apo-Extender-R 2x	2×	+2	7e/5g	same	approx. ÷2	—N/a	—N/a	70×35.4 mm (2.76×1.39 in)	270 g (9.5 oz)	11269	Compatible with most lenses ≥50mm
Extender-R 2x	2×	+2	5e/4g	same	approx. ÷2	—N/a	—N/a	62×30 mm (2.4×1.2 in)	180 g (6.3 oz)	11236	Compatible with most lenses ≥50mm

Leica Apo-Telyt-R module system
Focus module Head	2.8/280/400 1×(5e/4g) Cat.11843	4.0/400/560 1.4×(6e/4g) Cat.11844	5.6/560/800 2×(6e/4g) Cat.11845
280/400/560 (3e/3g) Cat.11841	280 f/2.8 8e/7g Cat.11846	400 f/4 9e/7g Cat.11857	560 f/5.6 9e/7g Cat.11858
400/560/800 (5e/4g) Cat.11842	400 f/2.8 10e/8g Cat.11847	560 f/4 11e/8g Cat.11848	800 f/5.6 11e/8g Cat.11849

== See also ==
- Leicaflex
- Leica R3
- Leica R4-R7
- Leica R8-R9
- Leica M-mount
- Leica Camera
- Single-lens reflex camera

Model	1960s										1970s										1980s										1990s										2000s									
Model	60	61	62	63	64	65	66	67	68	69	70	71	72	73	74	75	76	77	78	79	80	81	82	83	84	85	86	87	88	89	90	91	92	93	94	95	96	97	98	99	00	01	02	03	04	05	06	07	08	09
Leicaflex					Leicaflex				SL					SL2																																				
Leica R																	R3				R4						R5	R6				R7					R8						R9							
