= Leica R3 =

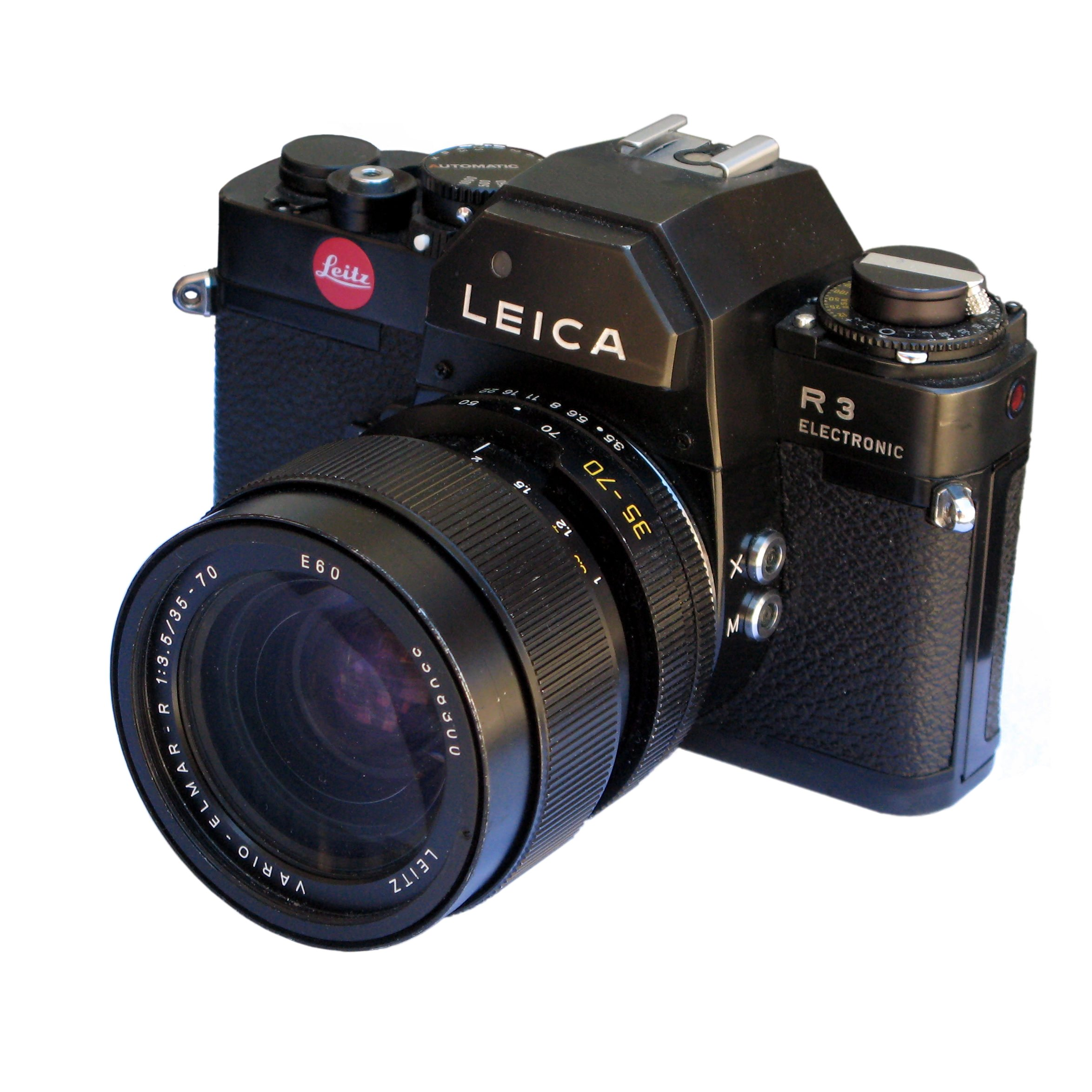

Overview
- Type: 35mm SLR camera

Lens
- Lens mount: Leica R-mount

Focusing
- Focus: manual

Exposure/metering
- Exposure: Aperture priority or manual

Flash
- Flash: hot shoe

General
- Made in: Germany, Portugal

Chronology
- Predecessor: Leicaflex
- Successor: Leica R4–R7

The Leica R3 was a 35mm SLR camera by Leica and the first model of their R series.

Leica launched the Leica R3 in 1976. It was the successor of the Leicaflex SL2, and was developed in cooperation with Minolta, together with the Minolta XE bodies.

It was a 35mm SLR with a Copal CLS electronic focal plane shutter, which was produced for Leica and Minolta only.

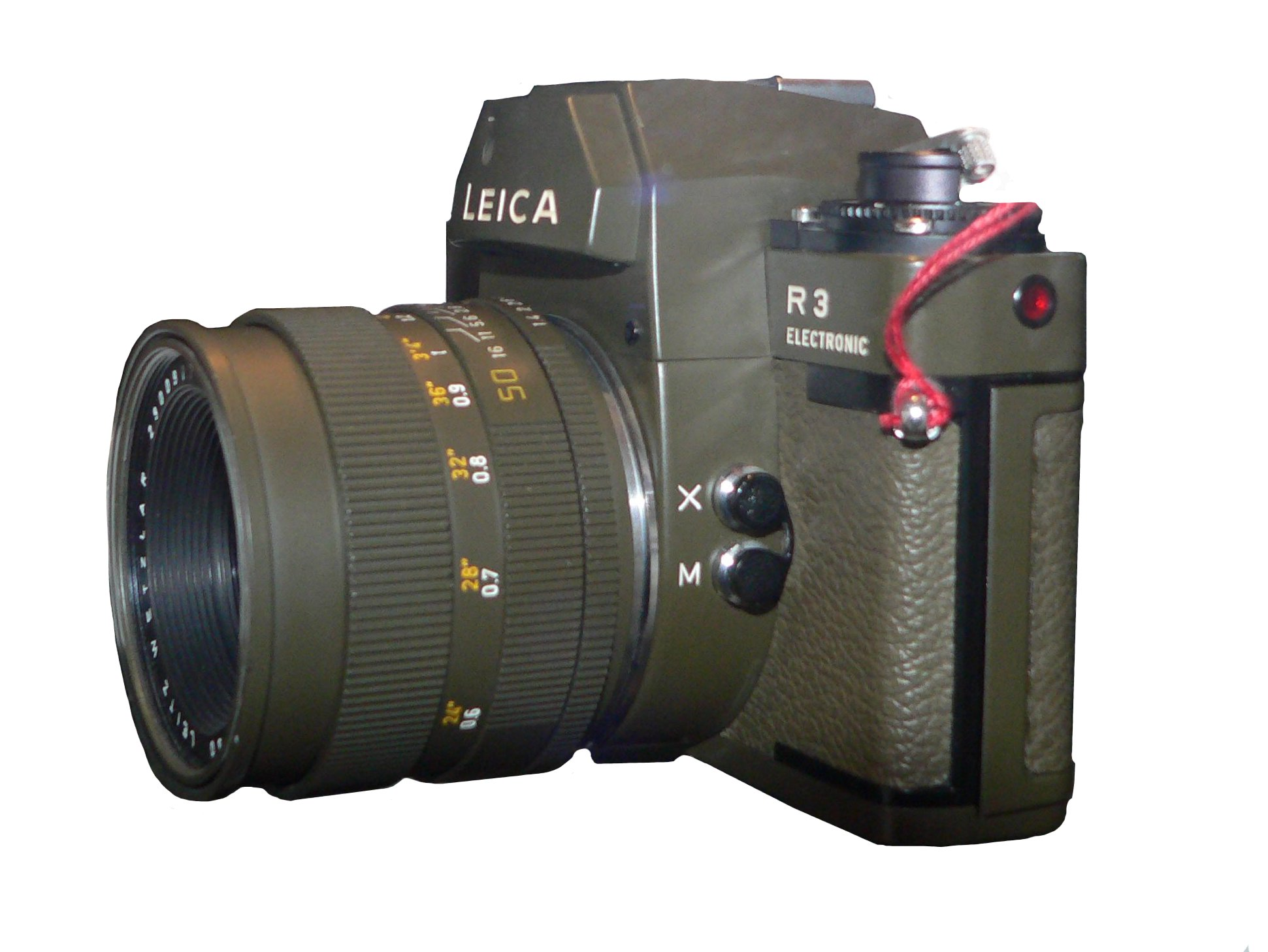
The Leica Safari, a tropicalised version of the R3

== Development ==
Following the Leicaflex series Leica took a totally new approach; the R3 was developed in cooperation with Minolta and closely based on their XE. Initially manufactured in Wetzlar, Germany, production was later moved to the new Leica plant in Portugal.

In appearance very similar to the Minolta XE using the same electronics, the camera incorporated a Leica developed shutter and modifications to the metering system offering Leica's traditional facility of selective metering in addition to integrated (centre weighted) metering. It was the first Leica SLR camera to offer automatic exposure. At its back the R3 has a window to show the type of film which is currently used. In 1978 the R3 MOT with the possibility to use a winder came into the market.

The camera was a commercial success at a very difficult time for the company, sales of the latest rangefinder Leica M5 had been very poor and the previous Leicaflex series had made little or no profit leaving the company in a precarious financial state, the R3's success seemed to indicate a new direction.

=== Light Measurement ===
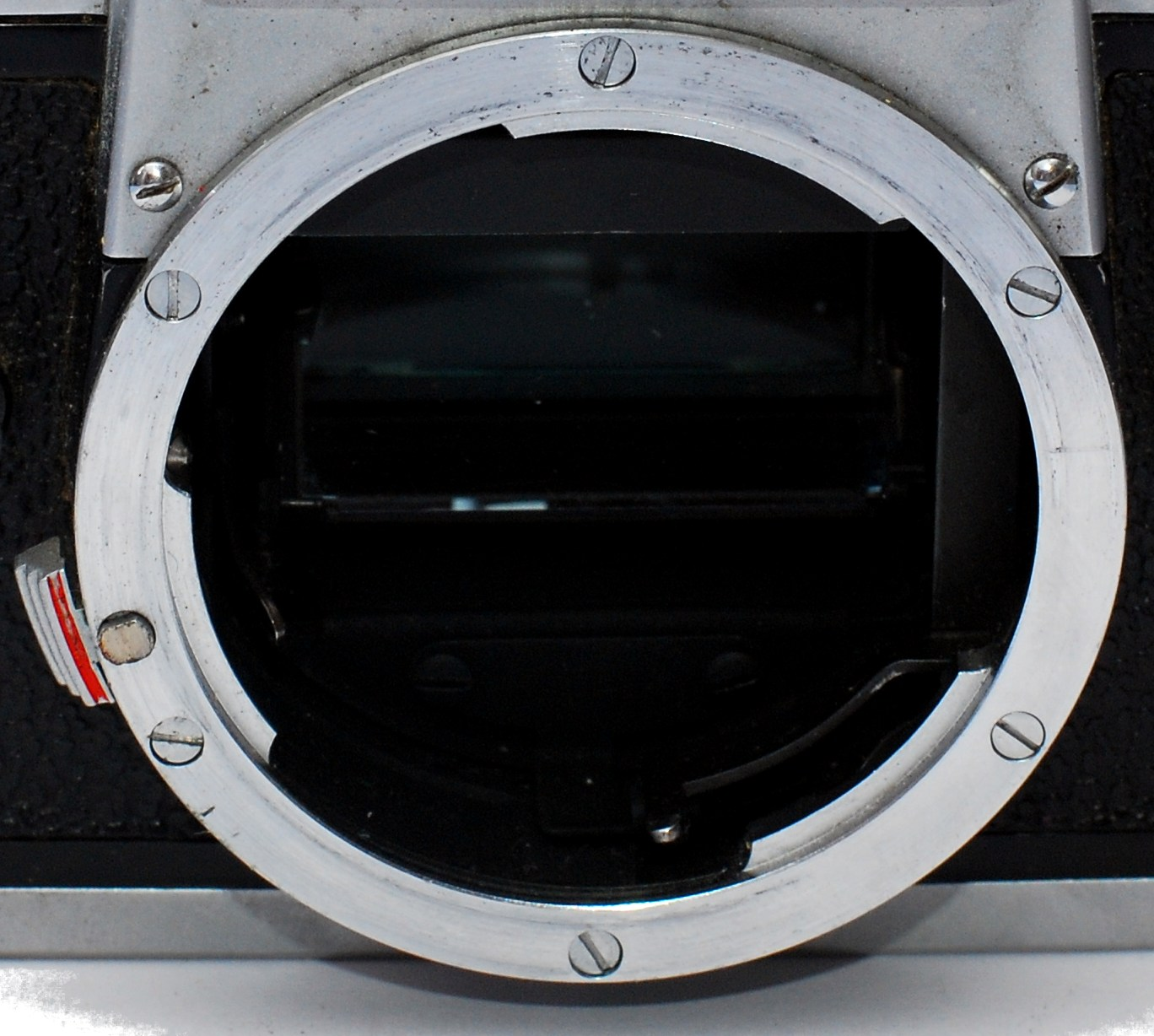
R-mount in a Leicaflex SL

For selective measurement the R3 used a secondary mirror with light cell in the base just like the Leicaflex SL. For integrated measurement two light cells were mounted on the viewfinder prism; switching between selective and integrated was electronic.

=== Leica R-mount ===
The Leicaflex camera lenses had either one or two sloping cams for aperture connection. The R3 replaced these with a single "stepped cam" conveying, in addition, the maximum aperture. From then on most lenses were made with all three cams but a few, especially those supplied with R cameras, had only the third stepped cam and were marked "Leica R Only". These lenses had a very small modification to the original bayonet making it impossible to mount them on earlier cameras.

== See also ==
- Leica R4-R7
- Leica R8–R9
- Leica R
- Leica R bayonet

| Model | 1960s | | | | | | | | | | 1970s | | | | | | | | | | 1980s | | | | | | | | | | 1990s | | | | | | | | | | 2000s | | | | | | | | | |
| Model | 60 | 61 | 62 | 63 | 64 | 65 | 66 | 67 | 68 | 69 | 70 | 71 | 72 | 73 | 74 | 75 | 76 | 77 | 78 | 79 | 80 | 81 | 82 | 83 | 84 | 85 | 86 | 87 | 88 | 89 | 90 | 91 | 92 | 93 | 94 | 95 | 96 | 97 | 98 | 99 | 00 | 01 | 02 | 03 | 04 | 05 | 06 | 07 | 08 | 09 |
| Leicaflex | | | | | Leicaflex | | | | SL | | | | | SL2 | | | | | | | | | | | | | | | | | | | | | | | | | | | | | | | | | | | | |
| Leica R | | | | | | | | | | | | | | | | | R3 | | | | R4 | | | | | | R5 | R6 | | | | R7 | | | | | R8 | | | | | | R9 | | | | | | | |
