= Nidec Copal Corporation =

Japanese manufacturer

Coordinates: 35°46′33.1″N 139°41′18.2″E

Nidec logo

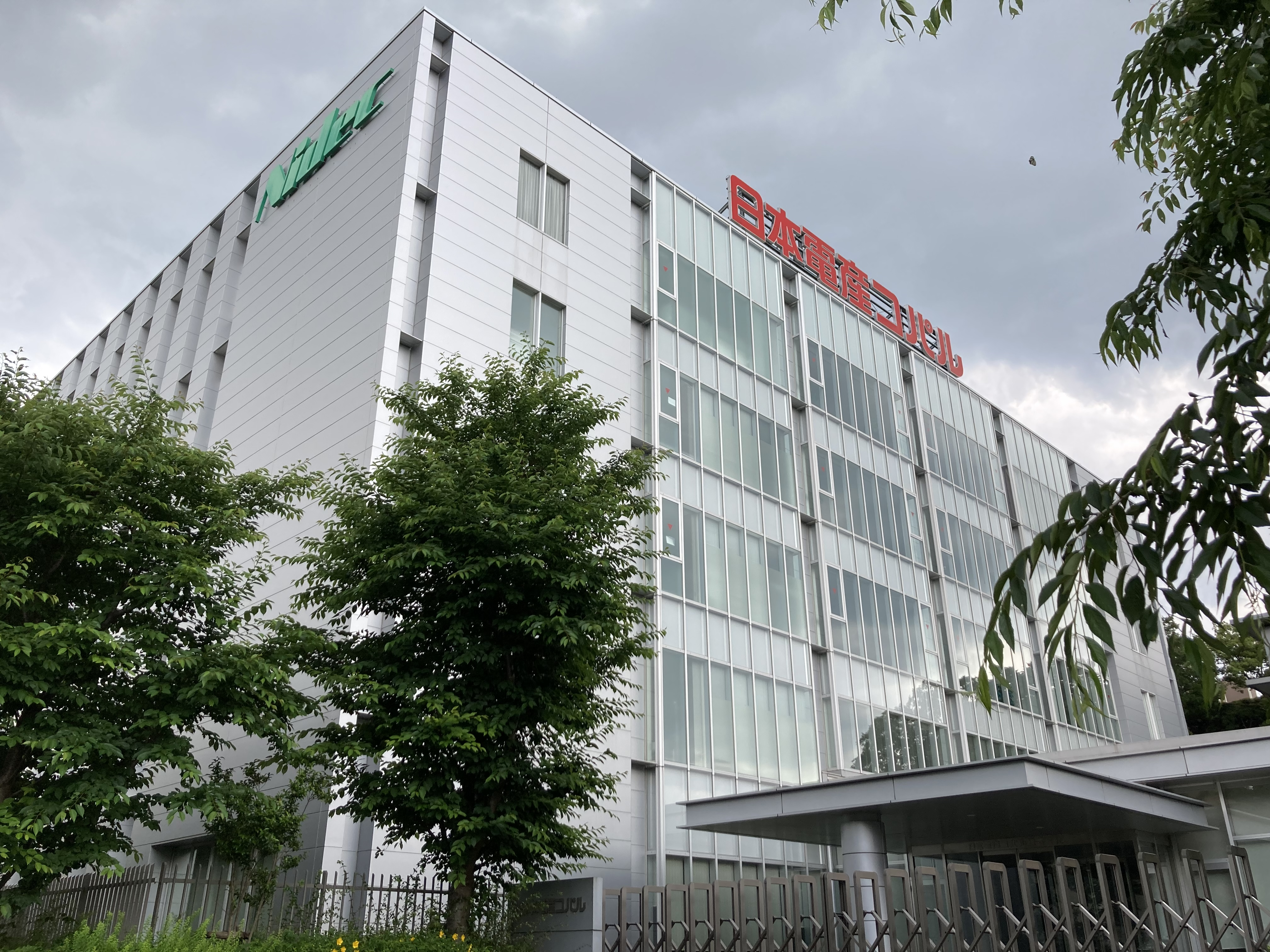
Head office of Nidec Precision (Copal) in Tokyo

The Nidec Precision Corporation (ニデックプレシジョン株式会社, Nidekku Pureshijon Kabushiki-gaisha), or The ex. Nidec Copal Corporation (日本電産コパル株式会社, Nihon Densan Koparu Kabushiki-gaisha), or Copal, is a Japanese manufacturer of optical, electronic and mechanical equipment, primarily for the photographic industry. It has been a subsidiary of Nidec Corporation since 1998, and was formerly known as the Copal Corporation. The company began operation in 1946, with small-scale production of photographic shutters; these are still one of the company's best-known products.

In the 1960s the company began producing the well-known Copal Square vertically travelling metal blade focal plane shutter, which was very successful and was used in cameras by many prominent manufacturers.

The Copal Square-S, for example used in the Konica T3s (1973-1978) and the Nikkormat FT, is very reliable. It works over a wide temperature range. The electronically controlled Copal Square E (1968) was used in the Yashica TL Electro X, the Canon EF, the Nikkormat EL. For Minolta XE and the Leica R3 the Copal-Leitz Shutter CLS was developed in 1972. For the professional Nikon F4 built 1988 until 1996 the Copal Square was developed and reached 1/8000 s and 1/250 s with flash.

In 2020 Nidec Copal has round about 6,450 employees and manufactures devices, that are used in automobiles, optical products and Tablets beside shutters for digital cameras.
