= Leicaflex =

Range of high-end Leica SLR cameras during the late 60s and early 70s

The Leicaflex was sold by Leitz from 1964 to 1976. The company changed its name to Leica in 1986.

The Leicaflex series of high-end single-lens reflex 35 mm format film cameras were introduced by Leitz Camera in 1964. The first camera body was paired with the new R bayonet series of lenses. Three model of the cameras were sold by Leitz; the Leicaflex Standard, the Leicaflex SL and the Leicaflex SL2.

Late into the market with high prices and limited range of lenses and accessories, Leicaflex sales were below expectations and production ended in 1976. However, the production of the R mount lenses continued and were paired with the new Leica R3 that was developed in cooperation with Minolta, together with the Minolta XE bodies.

== Leicaflex ==
Leicaflex
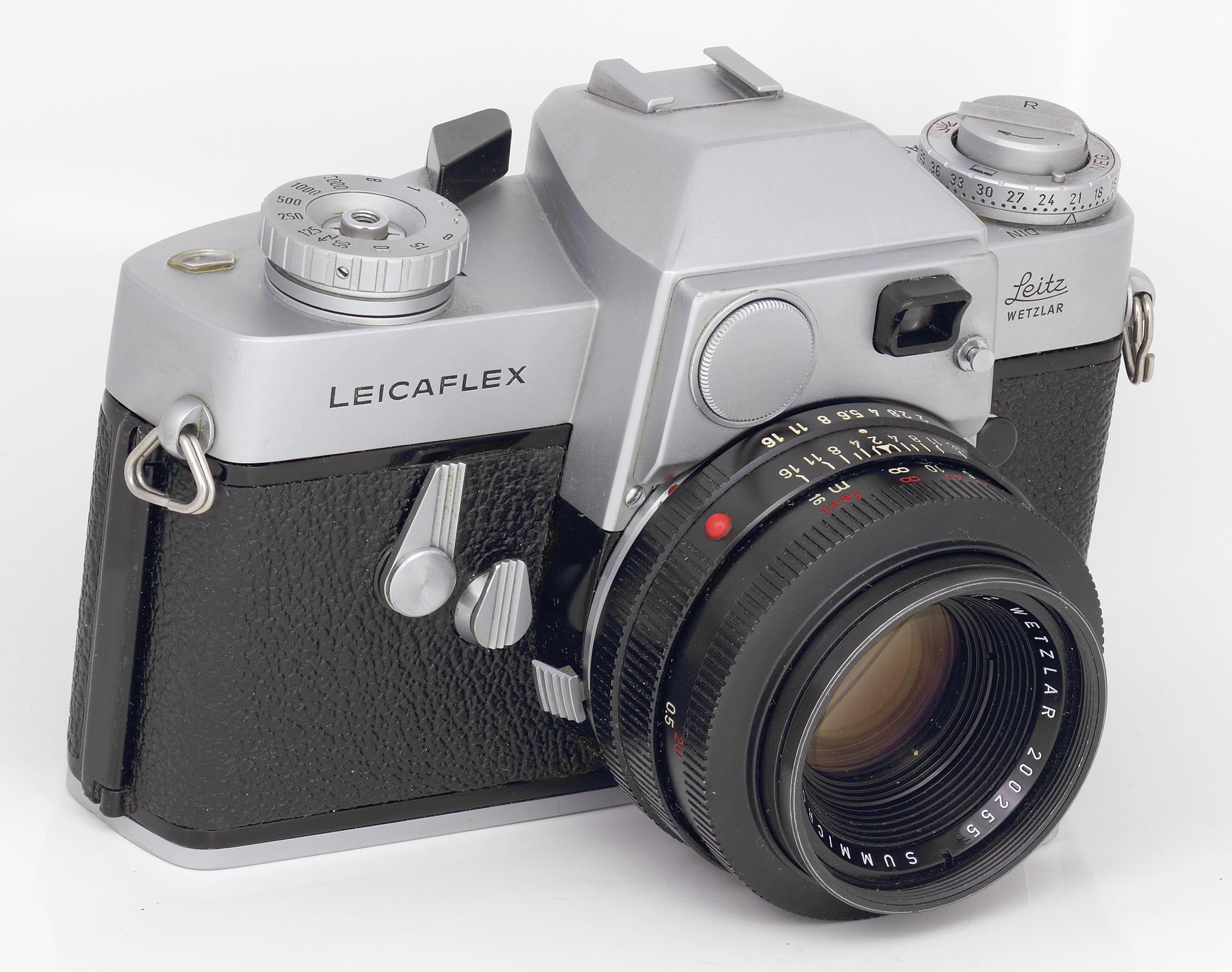

Overview
- Maker: Leitz
- Type: 35 mm SLR camera
- Released: 1964
- Production: 1964-1968

Lens
- Lens mount: R bayonet

Sensor/medium
- Film advance: Manual

Focusing
- Focus: Manual

General
- Dimensions: 148×97×50 mm (5.8×3.8×2.0 in)
- Weight: 770 g (27 oz)
- Made in: Germany

Chronology
- Successor: Leicaflex SL

In 1964 Leitz introduced its first single-lens reflex camera, the Leicaflex also known as the Leicaflex Standard. This was a response, albeit reluctantly, to the rising popularity of the SLR format. Ludwig Leitz, head of the company was urged to begin development by photographer Walther Benser back in 1955. This was due to Benser's opinion that the SLR camera system would soon rise in popularity. Development of the Leicaflex began in 1958 and the first prototype was shown in 1963. A year later the camera was released.

The Leicaflex featured a shutter speed range of 1 second to 1/2000 a second, a CdS exposure light meter (but not through-the-lens metering) and a new range of lenses with quick change bayonet (the R bayonet). The design was minimal, and the camera body was based on the Leica M. The viewfinder featured display indicators for the shutter speed setting and the light meter reading. Correct exposure is obtained by matching the needles displayed in the viewfinder. The shutter speed dial, film crank, film rewind and film count are all located on the top plate.

Due to its complicated mechanical construction the camera was extremely costly to manufacture. Its high price and lack of through-the-lens metering led to disappointing sales and only 37,500 units were made (mostly in silver chrome and about 1,000 units in black paint). Production of this camera ended in 1968.

== Leicaflex SL ==
Leicaflex SL
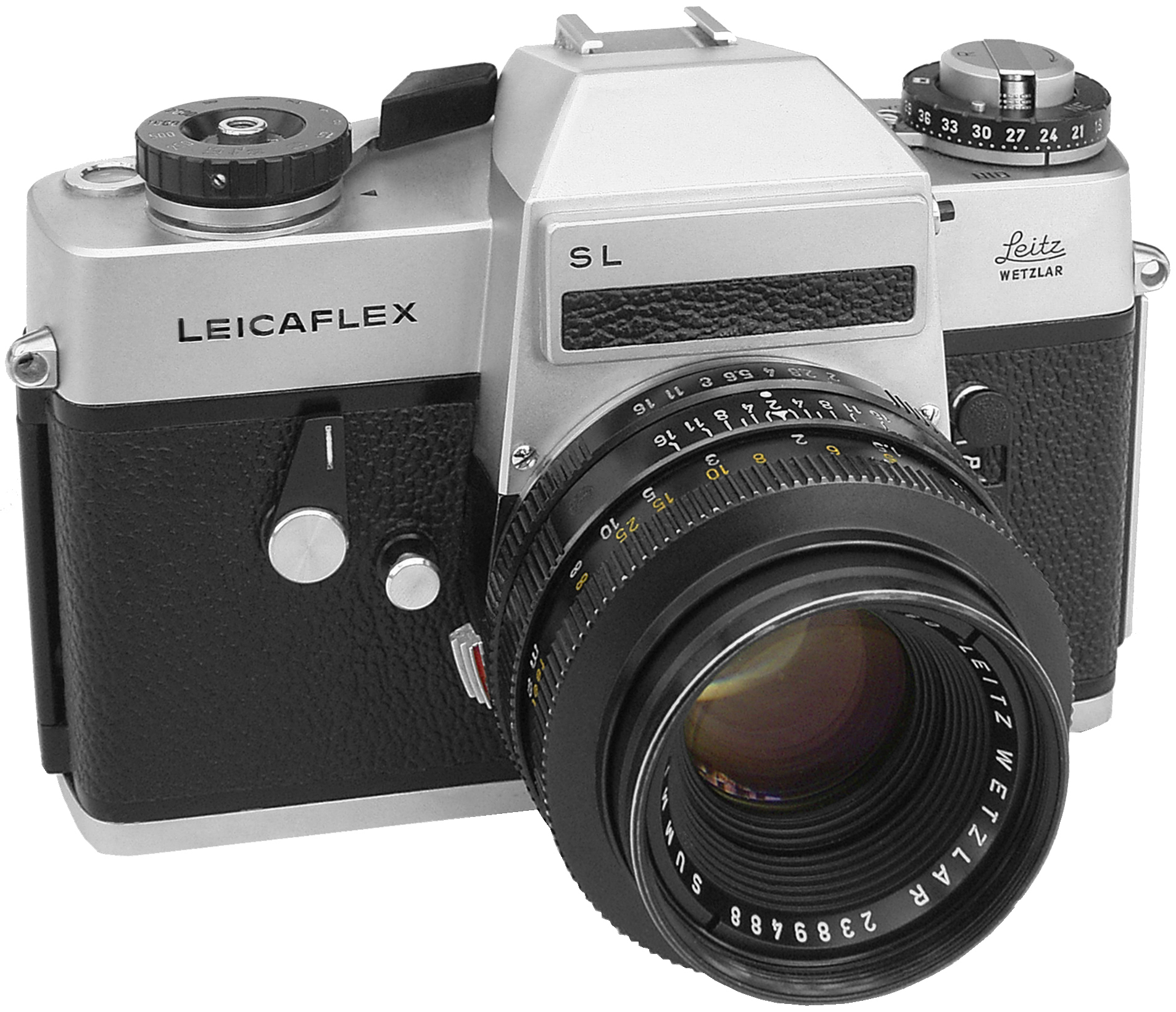

Overview
- Maker: Leitz
- Type: 35 mm SLR camera
- Released: 1968
- Production: 1968-1974

Lens
- Lens mount: R bayonet

Sensor/medium
- Film advance: Manual

Focusing
- Focus: Manual

General
- Dimensions: 148×97×50 mm (5.8×3.8×2.0 in)
- Weight: 770 g (27 oz)
- Made in: Germany

Chronology
- Predecessor: Leicaflex Standard
- Successor: Leicaflex SL2

In 1968 the Leicaflex SL was introduced, with the SL standing for selective light. The Leicaflex SL featured open-aperture TTL metering with a 5% selective measurement of the subject field, corresponding with the diameter of the circle of the micro prism. This meant that the Leicaflex SL was the first SLR camera with selective TTL metering. This was considered theoretically superior to other systems that relied on the average reading of the whole prism.

This model also featured a depth-of-field preview button. There were a few cosmetic revisions including the change of the colour of the shutter dial from silver to black and the relocation of the batteries to the camera's base plate. Models were produced in silver chrome and black paint. In 1972 a special edition was produced to commemorate the 1972 Summer Olympics, held in Munich, West Germany. The Olympic rings and the number 72 were engraved on the top plate, only 1,200 of these were produced with special serial numbers.

From 1972 to 1974 a small number of Leicaflex SL MOT were produced in black, and a few in silver chrome, with 'MOT' engraved on the top plate. These models have an internal drive shaft, which allowed an external motor to be attached for fast film winding. Furthermore, all contacts and controls were mounted externally on its base plate, thus allowing for quick mounting of the motor without the need to remove the base plate. The SL MOT, however lacked the self-timer and the meter switch in the advance lever of the ordinary models.

The Leicaflex SL (including the SL MOT) sold over 70,000 units. Production of this camera ended in 1974.

Because of the open-arpeture metering of the Leicflex SL, the Leica R-mount lenses produced from 1968 onward got a second cam lever attached to transmit the set aperture opening to the camera (so called 2-cam lenses). Older Leicaflex lenses with only one cam lever could still be used with stop-down metering.

== Leicaflex SL2 ==
Leicaflex SL2
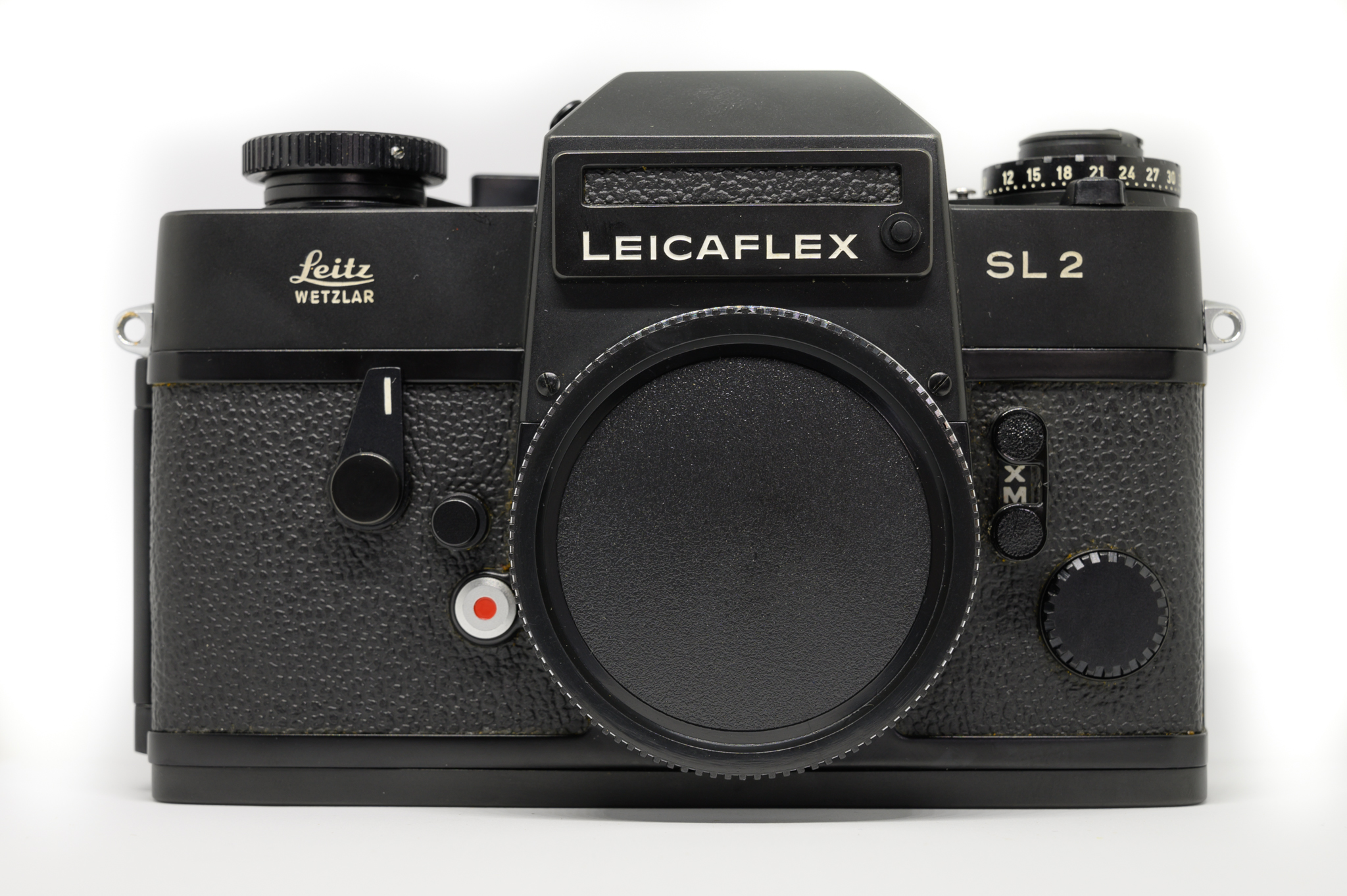

Overview
- Maker: Leitz
- Type: 35 mm SLR camera
- Released: 1974
- Production: 1974-1976

Lens
- Lens mount: R bayonet

Sensor/medium
- Film advance: Manual

Focusing
- Focus: Manual

General
- Dimensions: 148×97×50 mm (5.8×3.8×2.0 in)
- Weight: 770 g (27 oz)
- Made in: Germany

Chronology
- Predecessor: Leicaflex SL
- Successor: Leica R3

The Leicaflex SL2 was introduced in 1974. The new model contained several new features, but also some cost-cutting measures. Improvements included an increase in meter sensitivity (3 stops more than the previous model). The aperture indicator was added to the viewfinder, which could be illuminated by pressing a separate button (with added extra battery compartment). A redesigned mirror in the body allowed the camera to accept new wide-angle lenses (such as the 16 mm and 19 mm focal length).

Cosmetically the camera shape was squarer and was less curved than its predecessor. Models were produced in silver chrome and in black chrome. A switch from black paint to black chrome plating was chosen as the former process was more expensive due to the fact that the layer of paint was thicker than the chrome plating as a result different dimensions had to be made for the different parts in order for the final result to be of the same size. More non-metal components were also added to reduce the cost of manufacturing.

In 1975 a special edition model was produced for the 50th anniversary of the production of the first Leica. These models were engraved with '50 JAHRE' surrounded by oak leaves, only 1,750 were made.

A Leicaflex SL2 MOT was also introduced, all in black paint. Two models of the motors were produced to go with the camera. The earlier motor was for a continuous run for film rewinding, while the later model had a control marked 'E' (Einzel or 'single') for using the motor as a power winder for single shots.

Production of this camera ended in 1976, which meant that the camera was on the catalogue for only two years. During this period over 26,000 units were sold (25,000 SL2 and 10,000 SL2 MOT). By 1976 due to limited success, high cost of production and other financial constraints, Leitz discontinued the Leicaflex series. In fact, Leitz was losing money on each Leicaflex SL2 sold, due to the high-cost manufacture. The sales of the R bayonet lenses were not able to compensate for this loss and the entire product line became unsustainable for the company.

Furthermore, in 1973 the Leitz family transferred the ownership and management of the company over to Wild Heerbrugg, which had little interest in the photographic division of the company. However, a fortunate partnership back in 1971 with Minolta was able to save the R bayonet lens system. In 1976 the Leica R3 was introduced (designed and produced in conjunction with Minolta). The Leica R3 started a new series of camera, which on the whole were a lot cheaper and more electronically innovative than the Leicaflex series, whilst maintaining the R bayonet lenses. Leica did not return to the SLR market until 1997, with the introduction of the digital Leica S-System.

Model	1960s										1970s										1980s										1990s										2000s									
Model	60	61	62	63	64	65	66	67	68	69	70	71	72	73	74	75	76	77	78	79	80	81	82	83	84	85	86	87	88	89	90	91	92	93	94	95	96	97	98	99	00	01	02	03	04	05	06	07	08	09
Leicaflex					Leicaflex				SL					SL2																																				
Leica R																	R3				R4						R5	R6				R7					R8						R9							
