= MDRA =

MDRA may refer to:

- Democratic Movement for Algerian Renewal, a political party in Algeria
- Mid Delta Regional Airport
- Malta Drag Racing Association, drag racing in Malta
- Minnesota Distance Running Association, in distance running
- Motorcycle Drag Racing Association, in motorcycle drag racing

== See also ==
- MDMA
- MARA (disambiguation)
- MDR (disambiguation)
- MDA (disambiguation)
- MRA (disambiguation)
- DRA (disambiguation)
