= Konica Hexar RF =

35 mm rangefinder camera

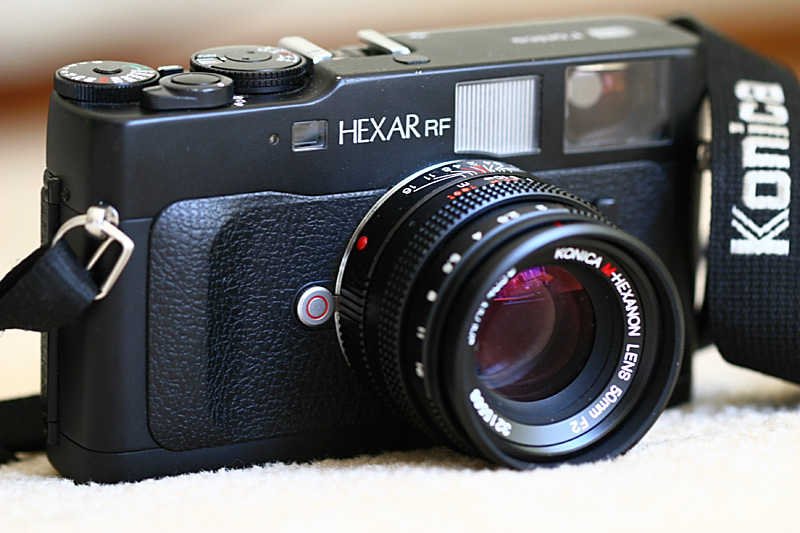

Overview
- Maker: Konica
- Type: 35 mm rangefinder camera

Lens
- Lens mount: Konica KM-mount (the same as or similar to the Leica M-mount)

Focusing
- Focus: manual

Exposure/metering
- Exposure: Aperture Priority AE or manual

Flash
- Flash: hot shoe electronic flash with direct X contact

Shutter
- Frame rate: 2.5frame/s in continuous mode

General
- Dimensions: 139.5×80×35 mm (5.49×3.15×1.38 in), 560g w/o batteries

The Konica Hexar RF is a 35 mm rangefinder camera which was sold by Konica. It was introduced to the market on 13 October 1999. and subsequently discontinued (apparently without official notice) some time before the end of 2003. The camera used the "Bayonet Konica KM-mount", a copy of the Leica M-mount, thus sharing interchangeable lenses with those designed for Leica cameras and others compatible with them. The Hexar RF has a combined rangefinder/viewfinder modeled on that of Leica cameras, a similar body shape and size - and so is similar to Leica M-mount cameras in many aspects of operation.

== Lens mount ==
The Konica Hexar RF accepts lenses designed for the "Bayonet Konica KM-mount" a copy of the Leica M-mount. Because of this, the Hexar RF can mount and focus lenses designed for the Leica and other compatible M-mount cameras or, when used with an adapter, the earlier Leica thread mount lenses (note that due to physical constraints there is no adapter to allow bayonet mount lenses to be fitted to a Leica screw-mount camera).

When first released there was some controversy and discussion about whether the "Bayonet Konica KM-mount" of the Hexar RF was, in fact, fully compatible with the Leica M-mount. Some earlier testers reported problems using Leica lenses on Hexar RF cameras. Konica made no comment on the issue, and continued to refer to their lens mount by their own name, with no reference to Leica.

Other testers found no problems, and suggested that early reports may have related problems with early-production samples or to cameras at one end of a tolerance range matched with lenses at the other, and so claimed there was no systemic problem. The latter seems to have become the consensus view. Many users report using Leica and Konica lenses and cameras interchangeably with good results, including lenses of longer focal length or wider maximum aperture where problems are more likely to be encountered.

== Viewfinder/Rangefinder ==
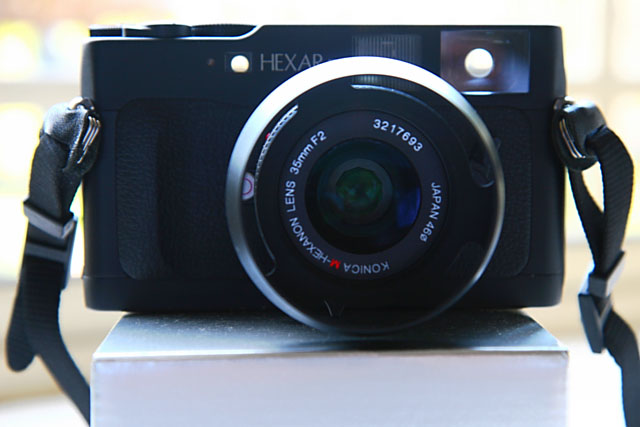
Hexar RF with 35mm lens, showing viewfinder (on right) and second window for split image rangefinder

The Konica Hexar RF camera uses a viewfinder combined with a lens-coupled "split-image and double image rangefinder" with illuminated, parallax-corrected, brightline framelines. As such it is very similar to the viewfinder/rangefinder of Leica M-mount cameras (if, perhaps, not as bright).

The brightline framelines that show in the viewfinder are selected from one of three frameline pairings, depending on the lens (or lens adapter) mounted on the camera:

- 50 mm and 75 mm
- 28 mm and 90 mm
- 35 mm and 135 mm

These pairings are the same as those used for later Leica M series camera viewfinders (Leica M4-P and subsequent models) and use the same frameline selection mechanism at the lens mount. A frameline preview lever on the front of the camera allows for temporary selection of a frameline pair other than the one selected by the mounted lens. The .60x magnification used in the Hexar RF viewfinder allows for all framelines to be easily seen, including by those wearing eyeglasses - even the 28 mm frameline (the largest). This also allows for generous amounts of "outside the frame" space in the viewfinder for other focal lengths, which can aid photographic composition. However, the reduced apparent size of the viewfinder image can make composing and accurate focus more difficult when using longer focal length lenses. (Note, by way of contrast, that the "standard" Leica viewfinder magnification has been .72x from the Leica M2 onwards, with .58x and .85x as options on more recent models including the current M7 and MP models.)

== Camera body ==
The Konica Hexar RF is similar in form-factor to Leica M-mount cameras, being slightly larger than the archetypal Leica M3 design in all dimensions, and just slightly heavier when batteries are fitted. Body construction is a cast-aluminium chassis with titanium top and bottom plates, finished in flat black, with a rubberised cover and slightly raised hand-grip. The chassis of the Hexar RF appears to be identical to that used by the Contax G2, with different top and bottom plates and similar but not identical film transport and shutter mechanisms. While the Hexar RF appears in some ways similar to the earlier auto-focus Konica Hexar camera, it seems to share few if any components with that camera.

Major controls, including shutter release button, surrounding off/mode switch, film-speed/exposure-compensation dial and shutter speed dial are located on the right-hand side of the top plate, as seen from the rear, as is the LCD displaying the current frame count. The viewfinder is located on the upper left-hand side of the camera. The manual rewind button, release catch for the camera back and cable release socket are on the left-hand side of the camera. The lens mount release and frameline preview lever are located on the front of the camera. The bottom plate has the cover for the batteries and a tripod socket.

== Film transport ==
The Konica Hexar RF has a hinged, swing-open, camera back with cut-out view window to show the film loaded in the camera. Film loading, advance and rewind is motorised and automatic. A button to manually trigger film rewind is also provided. Film sensitivity can be detected via standard DX encoding or the ISO value can be selected manually.

Film is automatically advanced to the next frame (and the shutter cocked) after each shutter activation. Shutter release and film advance are as described under shutter below. When the end of a film is reached (or the manual rewind button pressed), the film is wound back into the film canister, with a brief pause to allow the film to be removed "leader out" if desired.

Film transport is very different from Leica M-mount film cameras, which require manual film handling through a removable bottom plate and flip-up camera back, with film advance and rewind using manual levers and rewind cranks.

== Shutter ==
The Konica Hexar RF has a metal, vertical travel, focal plane shutter with digital electronic control of shutter speed. There is no provision for non-electronic shutter release: charged batteries are always required for shutter operation.

Shutter speeds between 16 seconds and 1/4000th of a second (continuous) are supported in aperture priority auto-exposure metering mode. Shutter speeds from one second to 1/4000th of a second (in discrete steps) may be selected in manual exposure mode. A bulb (B) mode is also supported (the shutter remains open while shutter release is activated).

Shutter release modes (and film advance) are controlled by a 4-position switch surrounding the top-mounted shutter release button. Positions are:

- off the camera is off (the LCD frame counter remains on while batteries are present, giving an indication that batteries are charged).
- single-shot the shutter is released and one frame advanced each time the shutter release is activated
- continuous the shutter is released and film advanced for as long as the shutter release is activated, at approximately 2.5 frames per second
- self-timer the shutter is released, and one frame advanced, 10 seconds after shutter release is activated

Shutter release is activated by pressing the top-mounted shutter release button or by a cable release inserted in a standard socket located on the side of the camera.

== Exposure metering ==
The Konica Hexar RF meters for exposure either by aperture priority auto-exposure (with AE lock and +/-2EV exposure compensation) or in metered-manual mode. Aperture priority is selected by setting the shutter speed dial to either the AE or AE lock position. Manual exposure is set by selecting a specific shutter speed on the shutter speed dial (there is a central interlock button to prevent accidentally moving the dial from the AE modes to a manually selected shutter speed).

Exposure metering is through-the-lens (TTL) and thus accounts for the aperture set on the lens in use. (Unlike SLR lenses, where the diaphragm controlling lens aperture is generally closed only at the time of shutter release, rangefinder camera lenses close or open the diaphragm directly as the aperture control is applied).

== Electronic flash ==
The Konica Hexar RF has an ISO 518-compatible hot shoe with X flash synchronisation for an electronic flash. Flash operation is manual-only: more modern TTL flash metering is not supported. Flash synchronisation speed is 1/125th of a second. The default flash is the Konica HX-18W.

== Packaging ==
The Konica Hexar RF was sold either "body only" or as a set in a presentation box containing the Konica Hexar RF camera, an M-Hexanon 50 mm f2 lens and an HX-18 electronic flash unit (along with a manual and accessories including a camera strap, body cap and front and rear lens caps).

== Konica M-Hexanon lenses ==
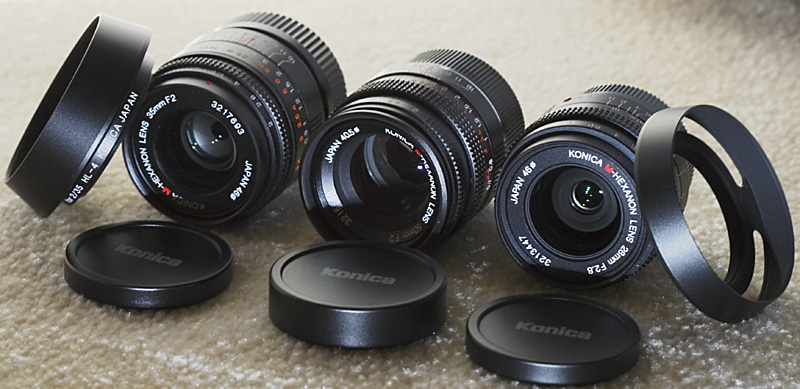
Konica 28mm, 35mm and 50mm M-Hexanon lenses

The original release of the Konica Hexar RF camera was accompanied by the release of three "Konica KM-bayonet mount" lenses for use on Konica RF cameras and others, such as Leica, with compatible lens mounts. These lenses were in 50 mm, 28mm and 90 mm focal lengths.

Subsequently, in 2001, an M-Hexanon 35 mm f2 lens was released, and a new-model 50 mm f1.2 lens was produced, for release only with a 2001-release limited-edition version of the Hexar RF camera.

In 2002 a dual focal length lens, the "M-Hexanon Dual Lens 21-35mm/F3.4-4" was introduced. Altogether, the range of "Bayonet Konica KM-mount" lenses produced consists of:

- M-Hexanon 28mm f/2.8 (1999)
- M-Hexanon 35mm f/2 (1999)
- M-Hexanon 50mm f/1.2 (2001)
- M-Hexanon 50mm f/2 (1999)
- M-Hexanon 90mm f/2.8 (1999)
- M-Hexanon Dual 21-35mm f/3.4-4 (2002)

Konica's Leica-mount Hexanon lenses (whether Leica M-mount or Leica thread mount) are considered to have optical and build qualities of a high standard: not dissimilar to those produced by Leica and Carl Zeiss. Konica's lenses were even used as a reference for the Japanese Ministry of Industry as the benchmark against other manufacturers' lenses. Production of M-Hexanon lenses seems to have ceased around the same time as Konica's Hexar RF production was terminated (2003).

== Other Konica rangefinder lenses ==
Konica produced rangefinder lenses for the Leica mount in the 1950s and produced a series of so-called "L-mount" lenses, in limited quantities, for the same mount in the late 1990s through 2001.

The range of Leica thread mount lenses produced by Konica includes:

1950s

- 50/3.5 Hexar collapsible
- 50 mm f/1.9 Hexanon
- 60/1.2 Hexanon

1990s - 2001

- 35/2 L Hexanon (1996)
- 35/2 L UC-Hexanon (2001)
- 50/2.4 L Hexanon collapsible (1997)
- 60/1.2 L Hexanon (1999)

== 2001 Limited Edition ==
Konica produced a chrome-finish Hexar RF Limited camera, targeted for the year 2001 (the new millennium) in a limited release of 2001 units, supplied in a boxed set including a new M-Hexanon 50 mm f1.2 lens and HX-18 flash. The lens was only manufactured for this set, so examples are unavailable except in conjunction with the limited-edition kit or the (apparently few) occasions where components of the kit have been separated. This means that most are held by collectors or those willing to pay "collectible" prices.

== Hexar RF Half-Frame ==
At some phase of the production of the Hexar RF, Konica made 50 units of a half-frame variant of the camera named Hexar 72.

== Successors ==
Production of the Konica Hexar RF camera was discontinued, without official announcement, some time before the end of 2003. Konica and Minolta (who had previously manufactured the Leitz/Minolta CL and Minolta CLE M-mount cameras) merged to form Konica Minolta in 2003. In 2006 Sony acquired photographic assets from Konica Minolta, with the latter company withdrawing from all photography-related activity. The targets of the acquisition by Sony were the designs and tooling for Minolta/Konica Minolta SLR cameras and accessories. It is not known whether Sony acquired other photographic assets such as rangefinder camera designs or whether those are retained by Konica Minolta. Whatever the case, none of the involved companies has expressed any interest in renewed production of rangefinder cameras or lenses.

Konica Minolta has since announced "Konica Minolta ceased the entire customer services for Konica Minolta cameras and related products, as of 31 December 2010." It appears that services such as downloads for camera manuals were withdrawn at roughly the time of this announcement.

Type	1950s										1960s										1970s										1980s										1990s										2000s										2010s										2020s									
Type	50	51	52	53	54	55	56	57	58	59	60	61	62	63	64	65	66	67	68	69	70	71	72	73	74	75	76	77	78	79	80	81	82	83	84	85	86	87	88	89	90	91	92	93	94	95	96	97	98	99	00	01	02	03	04	05	06	07	08	09	10	11	12	13	14	15	16	17	18	19	20	21	22	23	24	25	26	27	28	29
Leica					M3																																																																											
Leica								M2																																																																								
Leica																	M4							M4		M4-2				M4-P			M6															M6 TTL						MP																										
Leica																						M5																															M7																				M6							
Leica										M1														Leica CL																																									M-A (127)															
Non-Leica	Konica Hexar RF • 35mm Bessa • Cosina Voigtländer • Minolta CLE • Rollei 35 RF • Zeiss Ikon																																																																															
