= Konica mount =

Konica mount may refer to:

- Konica F-mount, 35mm SLR lens mount between 1960 and 1965
- Konica AR-mount, 35mm SLR lens mount between 1965 and 1988
- Konica KM-mount, 35mm Leica M-compatible rangefinder lens mount between 1999 and 2002
- Konica L-mount, 35mm Leica L-compatible screw lens mount (M39×26tpi)

== See also ==
- Konica Minolta A-mount
