= MDR =

MDR may refer to:

== Biology ==
- MDR1, an ATP-dependent cellular efflux pump affording multiple drug resistance
- Mammalian diving reflex
- Medical device reporting
- Multiple drug resistance, when a microorganism has become resistant to multiple drugs

== Technology ==
- Managed detection and response, a type of computer managed security service
- Massive Data Repository, a data storage facility for the United States' Intelligence Community
- Sony MDR-V6, a line of studio headphones designed by Sony
- Medical device reprocessing
- Memory data register, a hardware register where data to be transferred to/from memory are temporarily stored
- Mental dead reckoning
- Merchant discount rate, dues, fees, assessments, network charges and mark-ups that merchants are required to pay for accepting credit and debit cards
- Metadata registry, a central location in an organization where metadata definitions are stored and maintained in a controlled method
- Metadata repository, a database created to store metadata
- Mini D ribbon, a cable connector type
- Motion detection radar
- Multifactor dimensionality reduction, an algorithm for detecting interactions
- Desert Tech MDR, a bullpup rifle
- MDR, programming language

== Other ==
- Moldavian Democratic Republic, a state existing between 1917 and 1918, predecessor of modern Moldova
- mdr is the ISO 639 language code for the Mandar language
- M. D. Ramanathan (1923–1984), Indian singer known as MDR
- Mandatory declassification review, part of the process of removing the classification of a document
- Makati Diamond Residences, a hotel in Makati, Philippines
- Medical Device Regulation (EU2017/745), a 2017 European Union regulation covering medical devices
- Mitteldeutscher Rundfunk, German public broadcaster
- Mort de rire, a French expression for 'dead of laughing' (equivalent to English LOL)
- Mouvement démocratique républicain (Republican Democratic Movement), former political party of Rwanda
- Major district road in the state of Andhra Pradesh, India
- Movement for Democracy and Reconstruction, political party in Liberia
- Main development region, the area of the Atlantic Ocean in which the majority of its tropical cyclones form

== See also ==
- MD (disambiguation)
- MDRA (disambiguation)
- MRD (disambiguation)
