= MRA =

MRA may refer to:

== Medicine and science ==
- Magnetic resonance angiography
- Mineralocorticoid receptor antagonist
- Monoamine releasing agent
- Multiresolution analysis

== Organisations ==
- Madison-Ridgeland Academy
- Maharashtra Rationalist Association, an organisation in India
- Marketing Research Association
- Mauritius Revenue Authority
- Metal Roofing Alliance
- Metropolitan Redevelopment Authority of Western Australia
- Microcredit Regulatory Authority
- Monland Restoration Army
- Moral Re-Armament
- Motorcycle Roadracing Association
- Mountain Rescue Association
- Mugi Rekso Abadi, a media company in Indonesia
- Myanmar Restaurant Association
- Royal Museum of the Armed Forces and Military History (abbreviated MRA in French), a museum in Belgium

== Other ==
- Mail retrieval agent
- Market reduction approach
- Members' Representational Allowance in the United States House of Representatives
- Men's rights activist (or men's rights activism)
- Minimum reception altitude
- Mutant registration acts (comics)
- Mutual recognition agreement
- Northern Mariana Islands, US territory, ITU country code
