= MDA =

MDA, mda or variants may refer to:

== Businesses and organizations ==
=== Political parties ===
- Meghalaya Democratic Alliance (2003–2008), in India
- Meghalaya Democratic Alliance (2018–present), in India
- Movement for Democracy in Africa, in Burkina Faso

=== Businesses and other organizations ===
- MDA (company), a Canadian space technology company
- Magen David Adom, Israel's emergency medical, disaster, ambulance and blood bank service
- Malaysia Design Archive, a non-profit private organization
- Mecca Defence Alliance, an intergovernmental defence alliance
- Media Development Authority, in Singapore
- Medical Devices Agency, now part of Medicines and Healthcare products Regulatory Agency, in the UK
- Minnesota Department of Agriculture, in the U.S.
- Missile Defense Agency, an agency of the U.S. Department of Defense
- Muscular Dystrophy Association, an American organization
- Museum Documentation Association, now Collections Trust, a British charity
- Myanmar Dental Association, a professional association

== People ==
- A. P. Mda (1916-1993) South African political activist
- Zakes Mda (born 1948) South African author

== Science and technology ==
=== Computing and electronics ===
- MDA framework (Mechanics-Dynamics-Aesthetics), a tool used to analyze games
- Message delivery agent, software to route e-mails
- Mechanical design automation, a branch of computer-aided design
- Microconnect distributed antenna, a kind of transmitter/receiver
- T-Mobile MDA (Mobile Digital Assistant), a mobile phone
- Model-driven architecture, a software design approach
- IBM Monochrome Display Adapter, a video display card and computer display standard

=== Chemistry ===
- 3,4-Methylenedioxyamphetamine, known as MDA, a recreational drug
- 4,4'-Methylenedianiline, an industrial chemical
- Malondialdehyde, an organic compound
- Medium-density amorphous ice, a phase of ice
- Metal deactivator or metal deactivating agent, stabilising fuel additive

=== Other uses in science and technology ===
- MDa, mega Dalton (unit), a non-SI unit of mass
- Mass drug administration
- Mean directional accuracy, a measure of prediction accuracy of a forecasting method in statistics
- Mesocyclone detection algorithm
- Minimum detectable activity, in whole-body counting measuring radioactivity
- Multiple discriminant analysis, a multivariate dimensionality reduction technique
- Multiple displacement amplification, a DNA amplification technique

== Other uses ==
- Moldova, a country in Europe, ISO 3166-1 country code MDA
- MDA (TV series), an Australian TV show
- MD&A, management discussion and analysis, part of a financial statement
- Maritime domain awareness, understanding the maritime domain that could impact security, safety, economy, or environment
- Master of Defence Administration, a degree awarded by Cranfield School of Management
- Methods, data, analyses, academic journal for survey methodology
- Minimum descent altitude in an instrument approach in aviation
- Mada language, ISO 939-3 language code mda
- Leica MDa, a variant of the Leica M1 camera

== See also ==
- Misuse of Drugs Act (disambiguation)
- Missionary Diocese of All Saints (MDAS)
- MDA5, melanoma differentiation-associated protein 5
- 2,3-Methylenedioxyamphetamine (2,3-MDA), an amphetamine drug
