= Leica M5 =

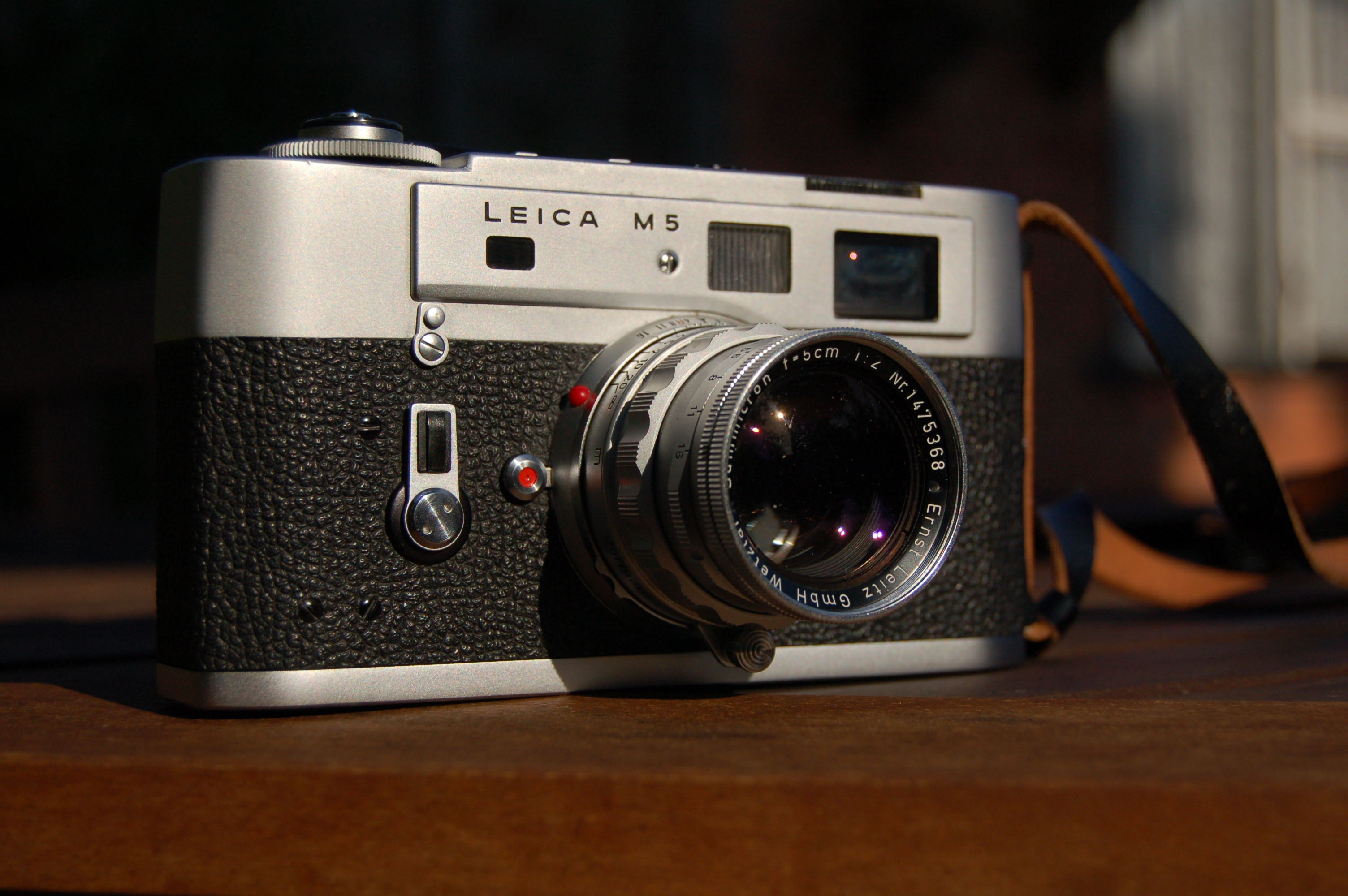
- Leica M5 with 50 mm f/2 Summicron

Overview
- Maker: Leica Camera
- Type: 35 mm rangefinder camera

Lens
- Lens: Interchangeable lens, Leica M-mount

Sensor/medium
- Film format: 35 mm
- Film size: 36 mm x 24 mm
- Film advance: Manual
- Film rewind: Manual

Focusing
- Focus modes: Split and superposed-image rangefinder

Exposure/metering
- Exposure modes: Manual (M), and Bulb (B)
- Exposure metering: 8 mm circular CDS cell
- Metering modes: Spotmeter (TTL Metering)

Flash
- Flash: X synchro hot-shoe with X synchro electronic flash and M synchro contacts
- Flash synchronization: 1/50s

Shutter
- Shutter: Mechanically timed horizontal running cloth shutter
- Shutter speed range: 1/2 - 1/1000 seconds

Viewfinder
- Viewfinder: Brightline frame viewfinder with automatic parallax-compensation
- Viewfinder magnification: 0.72x

General
- Battery: 625 mercury cell
- Dimensions: 155 mm × 84 mm × 36 mm (6.1 in × 3.3 in × 1.4 in)
- Made in: Germany

The Leica M5 is a 35 mm camera by Leica Camera AG, introduced in 1971. It was the first Leica rangefinder camera to feature through-the-lens (TTL) metering and the last to be made entirely in Wetzlar by hand using the traditional "adjust and fit" method.

== Design ==
The M5 departed from the traditional silhouette of Leica rangefinders that had few changes since the M3 (1954). The height and width of the body were larger (H 84 mm x W 150 mm x D 36 mm), and the body heavier (ca. 50 g more than other M cameras). The film rewinding crank is recessed into the bottom plate. The self-timer arm and the field-of-view preselector (now on the M5 additionally with battery test function) are of the same design as the Leica M4 (1967). The M5 was the last M to feature a mechanical self-timer (duration 5–10 seconds). The M5 incorporates an improved rapid film loading spool design over the M4. The M5 has a rapid transport lever which winds the shutter and advances the film and the frame counter in one single motion, or in a series of shorter motions. A marker for the film plane is engraved on the top of the camera housing. The M5's redesigned horizontal travelling cloth focal plane shutter is reported to be the quietest of the M series. The shutter curtains travel at a relatively low speed which has as a consequence the 1/50 second flash sync speed.

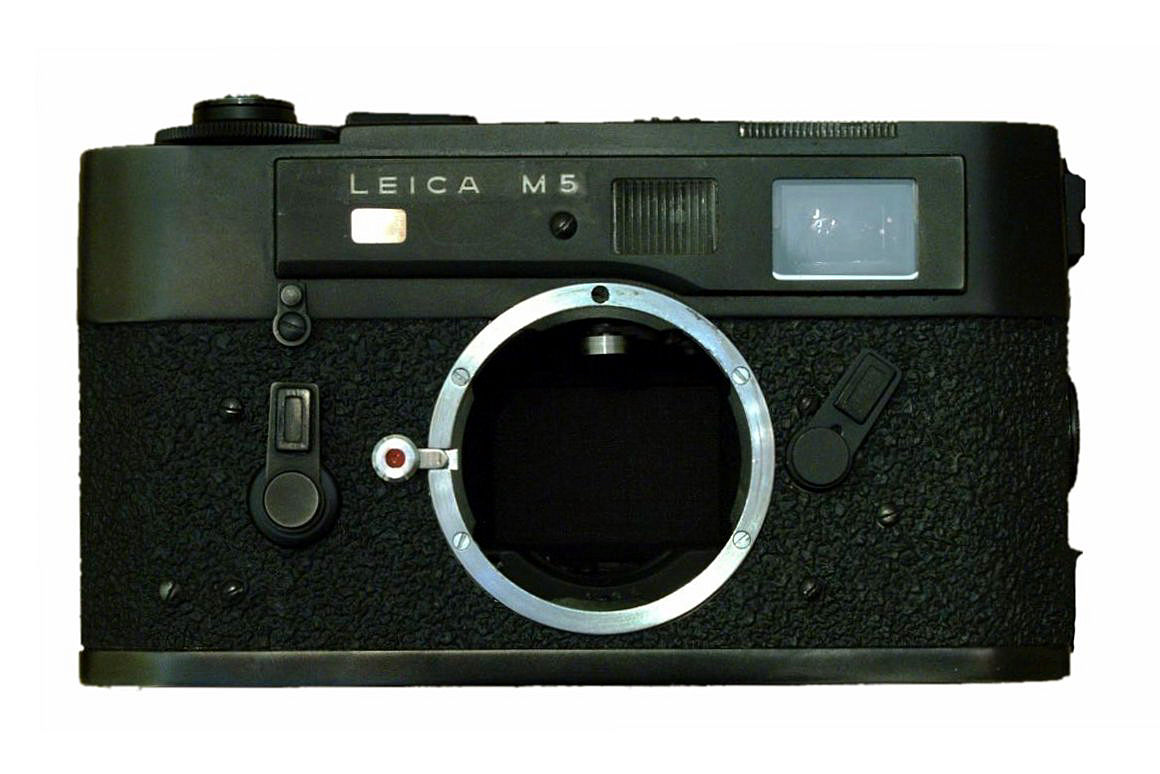
Black Chrome 2-Lug M5 Griptac Cover

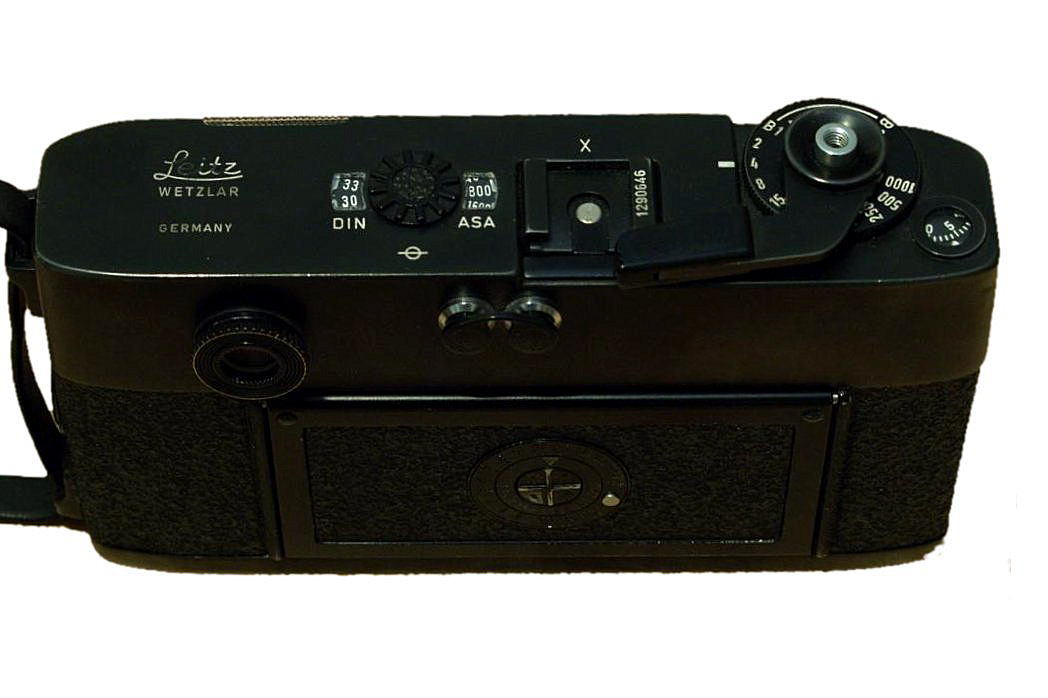
Black Chrome 2-Lug M5 Rear View with optional Astigmatic Diopter

=== Viewfinder ===
The M5's optical rangefinder / viewfinder mechanism is based on the M4 (itself based on the Leica M2 (1958). The M5 has 0.72 viewfinder magnification, with a 68.5 mm RF Base Length and 49.32 mm Effective Base Length (79% focus accuracy). No other magnifications are offered with this model. The M5 is sometimes said to have the best viewfinder of the M series (others prefer the original M3, and the current MP is perhaps even better). It is fully adjustable using setting screws, and is not glued as in the later M-series. The M5 viewfinder does not have the blue tint of the earlier M2/M3. Its lens surfaces are multicoated, reducing flare. As with other .72 magnification finders, the M5 can suffer from RF 'white-out' (where the focus patch disappears in some flare-inducing lighting conditions), but this is less pronounced than on all following M-series until the coming of the Leica MP (2003, in which Leica added condenser lens, which was previously removed from the frame masking mechanism while M4-2 was produced, with a coated glass element to rectify the flare problem. Like the M4, the M5 viewfinder features bright-line frames for 35 mm, 50 mm, 90 mm, and 135 mm lenses. The 35 mm and 135 mm frames appear together as a pair. Uniquely, its viewfinder displays both metered area and shutter speeds. Leica M4-P framelines may be optionally installed (typically the MP coated glass element will be installed at the same time; reported cost for both modifications c. US$500).

=== Exposure meter ===
The exposure meter uses a circular CdS cell 8.5 mm in diameter (coverage with 50 mm lens = 21°), and having a sensitivity of -0 (some estimates claim -1) - 20 Ev at 100 ASA (0.3-0.4 asb at f/1.4 to 200 000 asb; 0,06 to 32.000 cd/m2). Information from the exposure meter is displayed using a dual match needle system at the bottom of the viewfinder. An additional illuminator window at the top of the viewfinder illuminates the readout bar. The M5 exposure meter can be set from ISO 6/9° to ISO 3200/36°. The ASA/DIN film speed knob is designed to prevent inadvertent change. The meter's circuit is powered up by winding the camera, and shuts down when the shutter is released. The M5 exposure meter required the PX625 1.35 V mercuric oxide coin type cell which was banned because of its mercury content. The M5 continues to run on a number of alternatives including the Weincell MRB625. The battery compartment is located between the strap lugs. It is accessed by using a coin slot type threaded cap and is superior in design to that of the bayonet caps that surfaced as of the M6.

=== Shutter dial ===
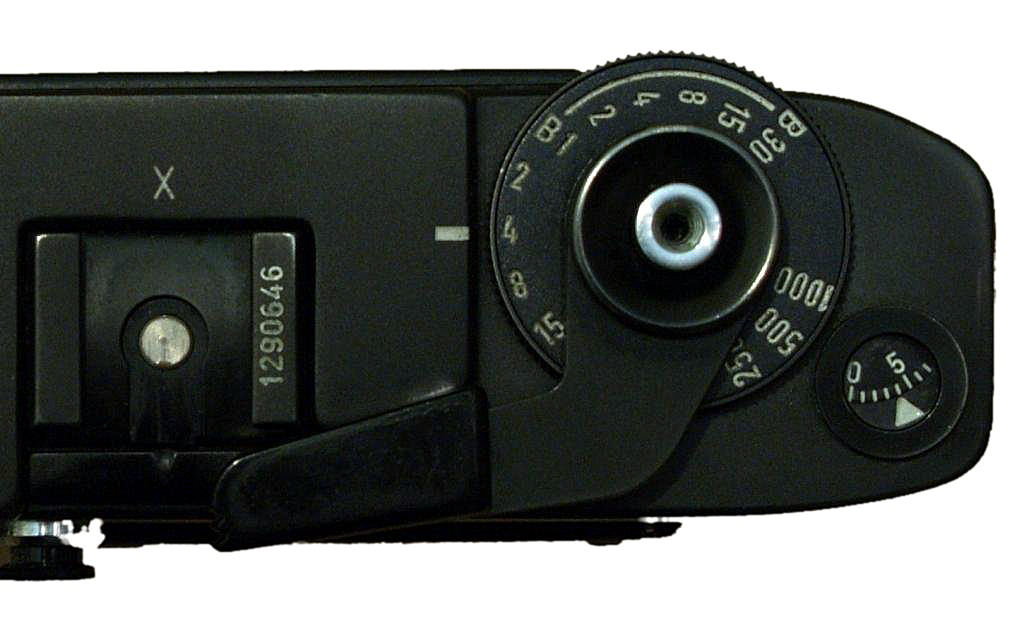
Shutter Dial Detail

The M5 has the largest M shutter speed dial. It is coaxial with the shutter button and overhangs the top plate, making for very comfortable and quick manipulation, adjustable without taking the camera from your eye. This ergonomic feature is often cited as one of the M5's paradigmatic advantages, and a non-coaxial variant was later reintroduced as of the M6 TTL (1998). The M5 is the only full-size M with shutter speeds visible in the finder. It allows reliable, linear intermediate speeds between full click stops from the 1/1000 through to the 1/2 second setting. The speed dial is additionally engraved with "B" (Bulb) speeds from 1 to 30 seconds. These settings are coupled with the light meter, but the exposure time must be manually implemented using a cable release. The camera's internal exposure timing mechanism disengages below the 1/2 second setting. The shutter release button is threaded for a standard cable release. The M5 is capable of making double exposures.

=== Vertical strap lugs ===
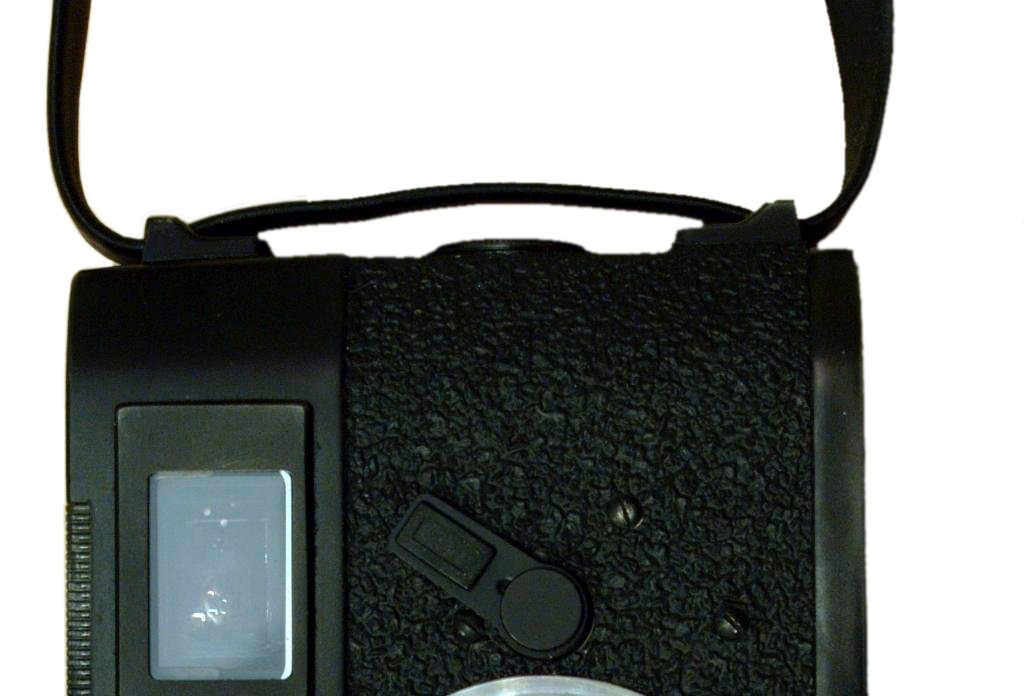
Leica M5 Vertical Hanging

Leica originally placed the strap lugs in order to hang the camera vertically. This was met by resistance by users prompting the addition of a third lug (1973, as of serial number 1355001 for chrome and 1357001 for black chrome). The installation of the third lug is available for earlier cameras. As some users have pointed out, the vertical positioning of the camera is effective when the camera strap is across the chest, allowing the M5 to be brought to eye level quickly while remaining otherwise partially hidden and protected under the arm. This necessitates the use of the proprietary Leica flat shoulder strap.

=== M5 Jubilee Special Edition ===
In 1975 a 50-year jubilee edition of 1750 units was produced.

== Reception ==
Leica M5 sales were very disappointing, and production was halted in 1975 after 33,900 units (from 1287001 to last serial number 1384000; 10750 chrome and 23150 black chrome bodies). Cost on issue for the M5 body in today's currency (Consumer Price Index Integer) is c. US$4200.

- Rangefinder camera sales were seriously undermined during this period by the predominance of mass-produced SLRs, primarily from Japan. In addition, Leica unofficially continued selling the M4, and the Leica CL was fully represented in the market by 1973.
- Often cited as also contributing to the poor sales are the larger size and weight, the departure from the classical M design, the impossibility of attaching a motor winder, as well as the incompatibility with certain deep-seated wide angle lenses and collapsible lenses (i.e. 28 mm Elmarit below serial number 2 314 920; further details contained in Older interchangeable lenses on the Leica M5, Leica Pub. 120-47 (1971)).
- The larger body dimensions also prevent the use of many M series accessories, such as external hand grips, quick release plates for tripod heads, or the Leica Lens Carrier M.

Leica reverted to the M4 and its iterations, until the coming of the Leica M6 which offered the features of the M5, albeit through the use of more electronic circuitry, while retaining the classic M design. The M5 is now a relatively uncommon type, and their price on the second-hand market is comparable to that of the M6. M5's were discovered by Japanese collectors in the late '90s and their price experienced a sharp rise at that time.

== Known issues ==
- Any precision mechanical camera like the M5 needs expert calibration and maintenance. The servicing of an M5 to factory specifications will cost typically US$500–600. This is also the case for cameras that have seen little or no use. It is not advisable to use an M5 before a qualified CLA, as the lubricants may have hardened and damage can result.
- Serial numbers above 134xxxx are usually considered more reliable as earlier problems in the production line were resolved by then (i.e. shutter speed dial clutch which was made more robust, preventing unwanted slipping of the setting).
- The CdS cell is only accurate when the camera is held horizontally; although the difference is reported to be inconsequential.
- The meter generally has been observed to have up to a 1/2 stop deviation varying over the spectrum of its performance specification (both in terms of luminosity and chromatic response).
- The exposure meter's mechanical arm is retracted by depressing the shutter release button. As a result, the exposure meter will not produce a usable reading if the shutter release button is under any pressure.
- Issues surrounding the fragility of the CdS cell affect many extant M5s; it is still available as a replacement part.
- In Leica M series cameras that have seen little use (i.e. those in pristine condition), the spring securing the lensmount bayonet lock may be weak or have its motion impaired. This can create the risk of a lens disengaging and dropping from the camera body while focusing.
- The M5 is covered in vulcanite, which can become brittle with age, and is subject to peeling and cracking. The M5 can be recovered with a variety of comparable materials such as Griptac.
- The 0.72 viewfinder magnification has the consequence that the 35 mm framelines are not easily visible for users wearing eyeglasses; an optional eyepiece diopter (available from -3 to +3, or without lens for fitting of a custom lens) may be screwed into the viewfinder to remedy this. The astigmatic custom eyepiece diopter is no longer offered by Leica.
- The cloth shutter is susceptible to getting pinholes burned in it by an uncapped lens in bright sunlight.
- The camera should always be stored uncocked. The tensions on the horizontal cloth shutter may otherwise damage it.

Type	1950s										1960s										1970s										1980s										1990s										2000s										2010s										2020s									
Type	50	51	52	53	54	55	56	57	58	59	60	61	62	63	64	65	66	67	68	69	70	71	72	73	74	75	76	77	78	79	80	81	82	83	84	85	86	87	88	89	90	91	92	93	94	95	96	97	98	99	00	01	02	03	04	05	06	07	08	09	10	11	12	13	14	15	16	17	18	19	20	21	22	23	24	25	26	27	28	29
Leica					M3																																																																											
Leica								M2																																																																								
Leica																	M4							M4		M4-2				M4-P			M6															M6 TTL						MP																										
Leica																						M5																															M7																				M6							
Leica										M1														Leica CL																																									M-A (127)															
Non-Leica	Konica Hexar RF • 35mm Bessa • Cosina Voigtländer • Minolta CLE • Rollei 35 RF • Zeiss Ikon																																																																															
