= Leica M4 =

35 mm rangefinder camera by Leica AG

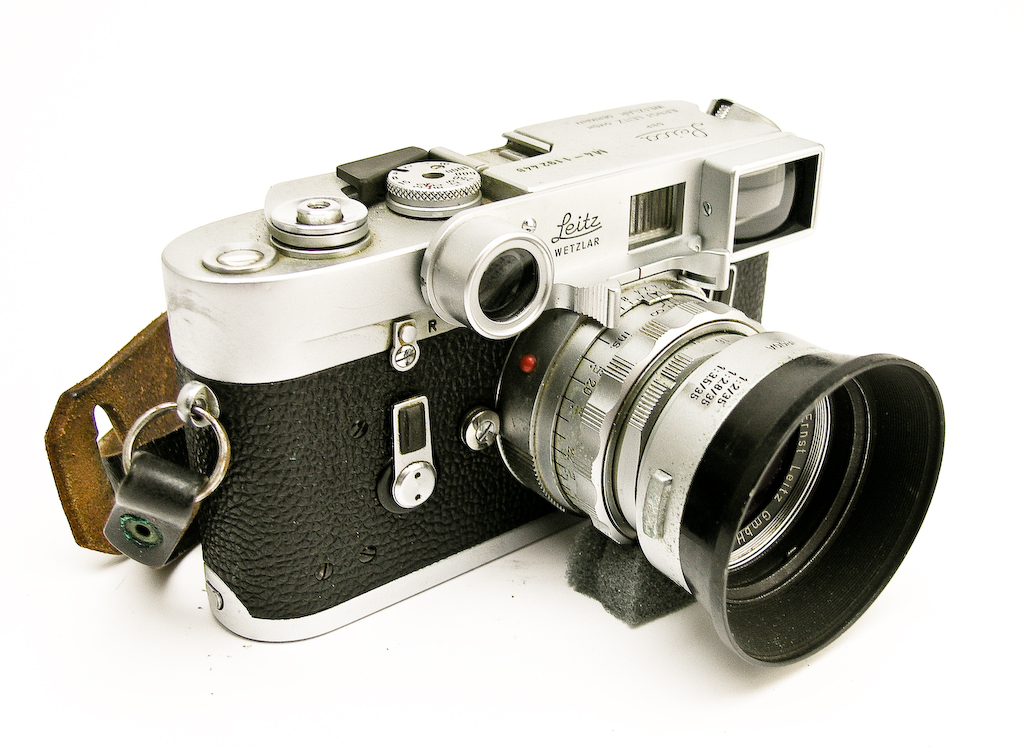
- Leica M4 with 35mm f/2 and proxiphotography glasses

Overview
- Maker: Leica Camera
- Type: 35 mm camera

Lens
- Lens mount: Leica M-mount

Focusing
- Focus: manual

Exposure/metering
- Exposure: manual

Flash
- Flash: Connectors for bulb and electronic flash

General
- Dimensions: 138×77×33.5 mm (5.43×3.03×1.32 in)
- Weight: 560 g (20 oz)

The Leica M4 is a 35 mm rangefinder camera produced by Ernst Leitz GmbH.

== Leica M4 ==
The M4 started production in November 1966, as the direct successor of the M3 and M2, featuring framelines for 35 mm, 50 mm, 90 mm and 135 mm lenses in a 0.72 magnification viewfinder. It has the frame counter of the M3, with automatic reset after reloading. The M4 was the last Leica rangefinder of this era to be predominantly hand-built.

Three ergonomic modifications were introduced in the M4:

- an articulating film advance lever, modernised self-timer and frame selection levers
- an angled crank for rewinding the film that replaced the slow to use telescopic knob of the M3
- a faster loading system that does not require use of a removable spool

Production of the Leica M4 ceased in 1975.

An olive coloured Leica M4, originally designed for the West German Army, sold at auction in 2009 for €87,600.

== Leica MDa ==
A scientific version without a viewfinder was made as the Leica MDa (similar to the Leica M1).

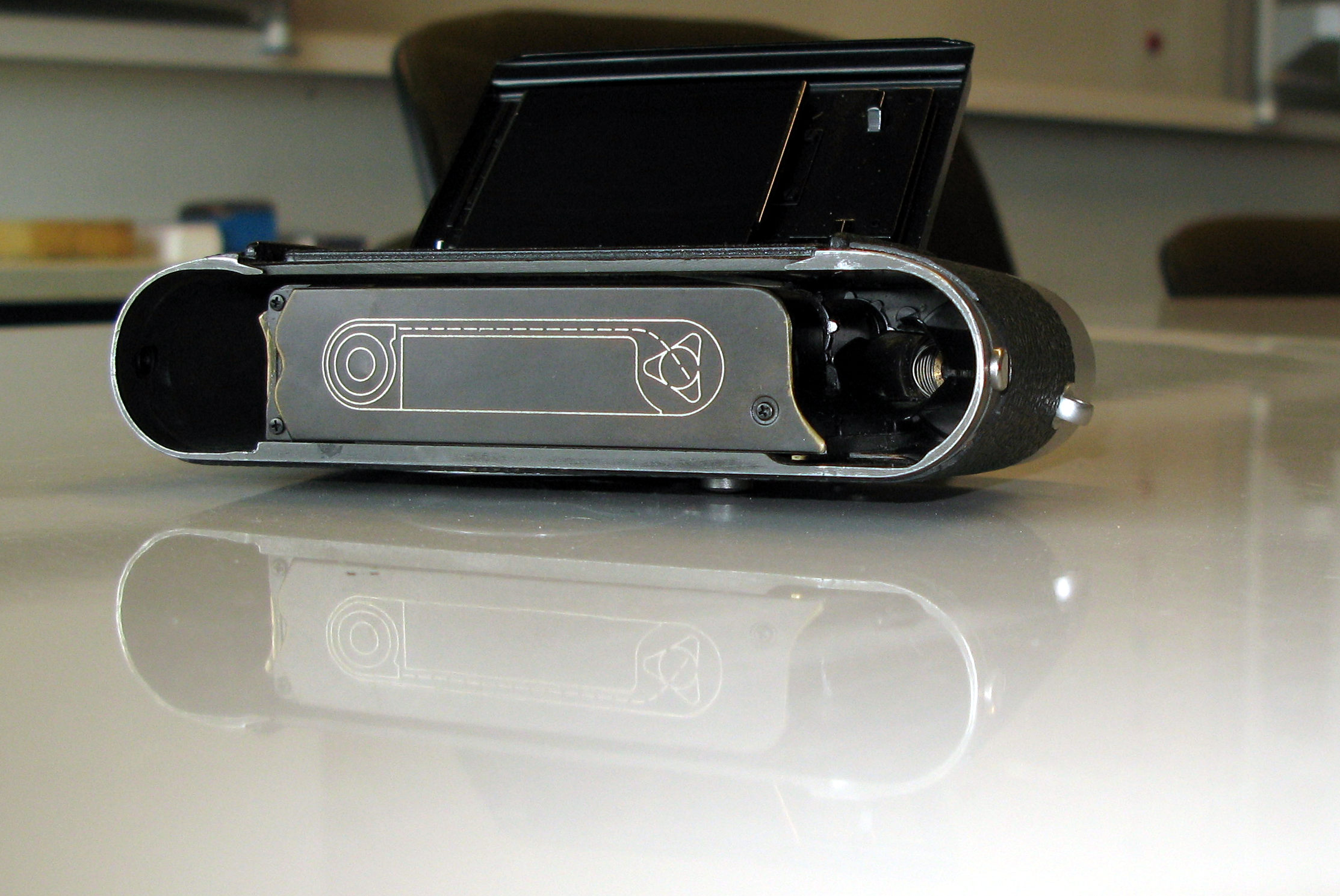
loading system of a Leica MDa

== Leica M4-2, Leica M4-P, Leica MD-2 ==
Production of the M4 stopped briefly in 1972. Its successor, the M5 had been introduced in 1971. However, the relatively bulky and expensive M5 met with a cool reception, and sales did not live up to Leica's expectations. Production of the M4 was therefore restarted quickly until 1975. In the year 1975, a special edition was made for Leica's 50th Anniversary, and in 1977 the company launched the updated M4-2, which was based on the M4's body, but with a streamlined production process that reduced manufacturing cost. The M4-2 added a hot shoe and motor drive compatibility as standard, but removed the self-timer.

The M4-2 was followed in 1981 by the M4-P, which added framelines for 28 mm and 75 mm lenses. The range continued with the Leica M6 in 1984, which was essentially an M4-P with through-the-lens (TTL) light metering. The M4-P finally ceased production in 1986.

Starting in 1980, Leica also produced a simplified derivative of the M4-2 called the MD-2.

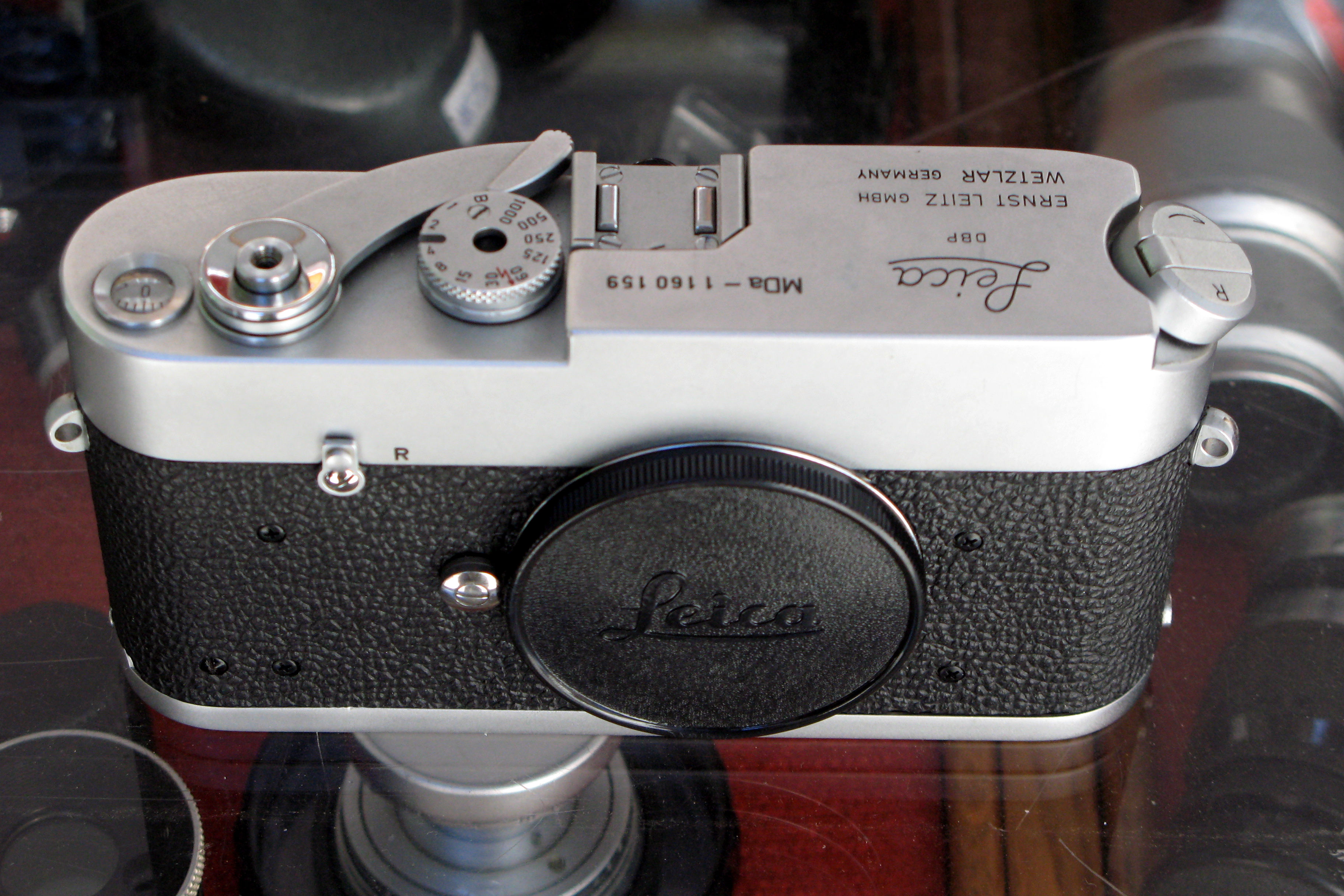
Leica MDa

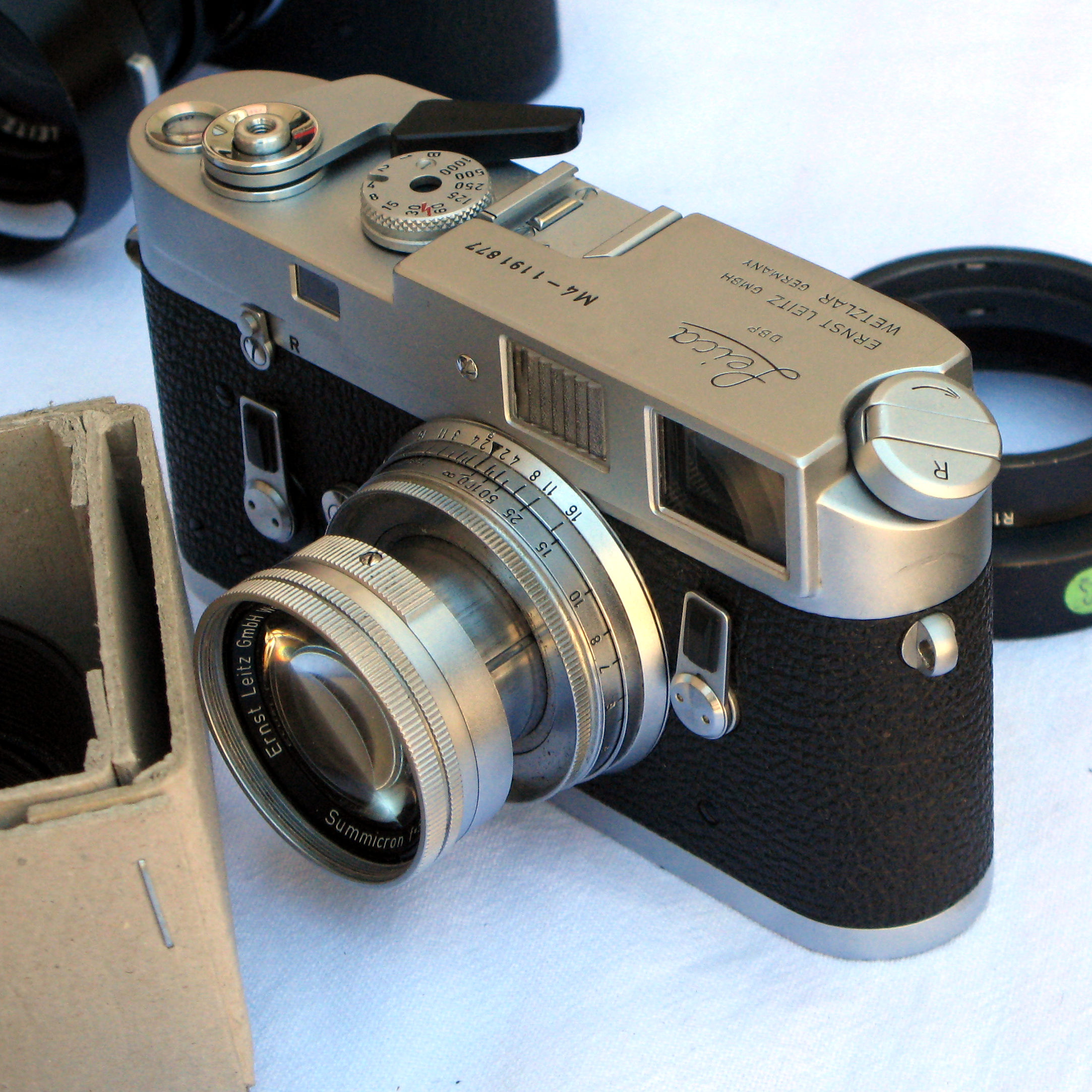
Classic M4 with the rewinding crank well visible

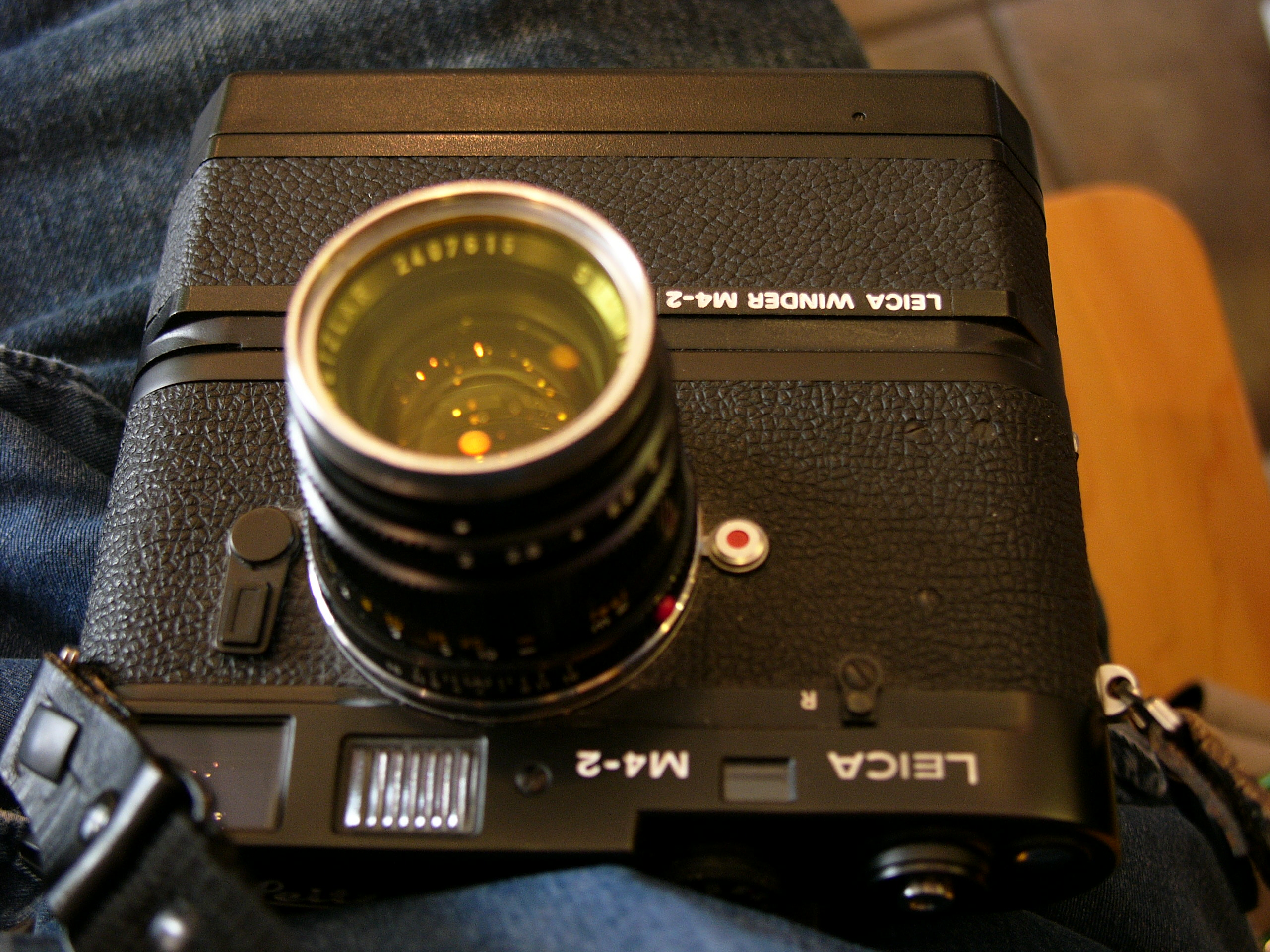
Leica M4-2 with motor drive

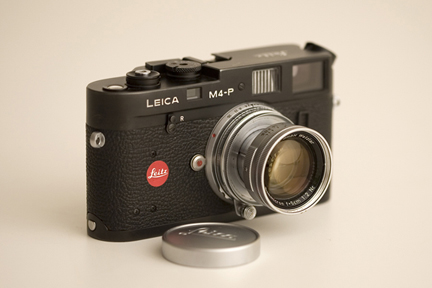
Leica M4-P

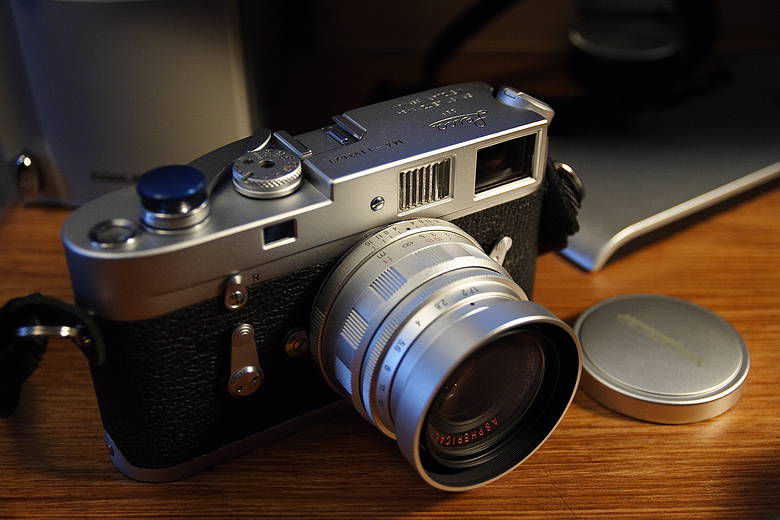
Leica M4 with M3-like levers, a popular cosmetic change

== Most known users ==
Garry Winogrand, known for his prolific street photography and his ability to capture the dynamic energy of American life in the mid-20th century, reportedly shot over a million photographs with his Leica.

Richard Kalvar is another street photographer who frequently used the Leica M4, typically with a 35 mm lens.

Type	1950s										1960s										1970s										1980s										1990s										2000s										2010s										2020s									
Type	50	51	52	53	54	55	56	57	58	59	60	61	62	63	64	65	66	67	68	69	70	71	72	73	74	75	76	77	78	79	80	81	82	83	84	85	86	87	88	89	90	91	92	93	94	95	96	97	98	99	00	01	02	03	04	05	06	07	08	09	10	11	12	13	14	15	16	17	18	19	20	21	22	23	24	25	26	27	28	29
Leica					M3																																																																											
Leica								M2																																																																								
Leica																	M4							M4		M4-2				M4-P			M6															M6 TTL						MP																										
Leica																						M5																															M7																				M6							
Leica										M1														Leica CL																																									M-A (127)															
Non-Leica	Konica Hexar RF • 35mm Bessa • Cosina Voigtländer • Minolta CLE • Rollei 35 RF • Zeiss Ikon																																																																															
