= Minolta CLE =

35 mm rangefinder camera

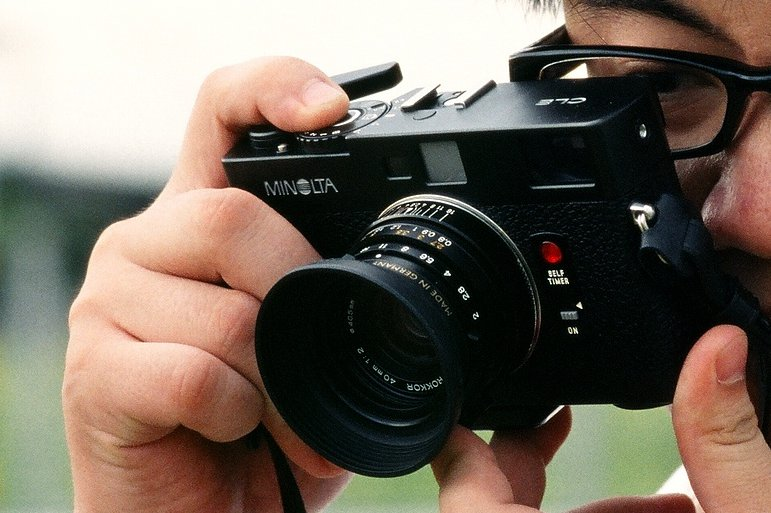

Overview
- Type: 35 mm rangefinder camera

Lens
- Lens mount: Leica M-mount

Focusing
- Focus: Manual

Exposure/metering
- Exposure: Manual + Automatic aperture priority
- Exposure metering: TTL

Flash
- Flash: Fixed hot shoe, TTL contacts

General
- Battery: 2 A76
- Body features: Plastic and black metal chrome plating over plastic.
- Dimensions: 124.5 mm × 77.5 mm × 32 mm (4.90 in × 3.05 in × 1.26 in)
- Weight: 380.1 g (13.41 oz)

The Minolta CLE is a TTL-metering manual & automatic exposure aperture-priority 35 mm rangefinder camera using Leica M lenses, introduced by Minolta in 1980.

Leica and Minolta signed a technical cooperation agreement in June 1972. One of its results was the joint development of the Leica CL, a compact rangefinder camera introduced in 1973 and discontinued a few years later. The CLE was a new rangefinder body resembling the Leica CL.

== Description ==
The Minolta CLE is based on the Minolta XG-series SLRs. The viewfinder has projected frames for 28 mm, 40 mm and 90 mm focal lengths. It had a black finish, except for run of 300 gold-plated cameras sold in the Japanese market.

The CLE has an electronic focal plane shutter to 1/1000 seconds, and a through-the-lens (TTL) silicon photodiode (SPD) exposure meter with aperture-priority automatic or manual exposure, and automated ambient and flash exposure metering system continuing to work and dynamically adjusting the shutter speed and TTL, off the film (OTF) flash during the exposure itself. The ambient metering worked in a very similar way to that employed by the then current Olympus OM-2n single-lens reflex camera(SLR) camera. Ambient light was measured by the SPD as it was reflected off a pattern on the shutter curtains. It also proved particularly useful if filters were being used. None of these features would appear on any other body for M-mount lenses until the Konica Hexar RF of 1999, which has all but TTL-OTF flash metering and dynamic exposure.

== Lenses ==
Three of Minolta's Rokkor brand of lenses were made specially for the CLE: the M-Rokkor 28 mm f/2.8 wide-angle, the M-Rokkor (-QF) 40 mm f/2 standard, and the M-Rokkor 90 mm f/4 telephoto.

The earlier Leica CL 40 mm and 90 mm lenses had single coatings, and later Minolta CL-E versions of these two lenses, plus a 28 mm, were multi-coated, with the same optical scheme. The earlier Leica CLs did not have 28 mm frame-lines.

Lens	28 mm f/2.8	40 mm f/2	90 mm f/4
Construction	7 elements in 5 groups	6 elements in 4 groups	4 elements in 4 groups
Angle of view	75°	57°	27°
Coating	Minolta Achromatic		
Min. focusing dist.	0.8 m (2 ft 7 in)		1 m (3 ft 3 in)
Aperture scale	2.8, 4, 5.6, 8, 11, 16, 22	2, 2.8, 4, 5.6, 8, 11, 16	4, 5.6, 8, 11, 16, 22
Aperture	Full and half-click stops		
Filter thread diameter	40.5 mm		
Dimensions (diameter × length)	51 mm × 35.5 mm (2.01 in × 1.40 in)	51 mm × 24.5 mm (2.01 in × 0.96 in)	51 mm × 60 mm (2.0 in × 2.4 in)
Weight	135 g (4.8 oz)	105 g (3.7 oz)	250 g (8.8 oz)

== Notes ==
Type	1950s										1960s										1970s										1980s										1990s										2000s										2010s										2020s									
Type	50	51	52	53	54	55	56	57	58	59	60	61	62	63	64	65	66	67	68	69	70	71	72	73	74	75	76	77	78	79	80	81	82	83	84	85	86	87	88	89	90	91	92	93	94	95	96	97	98	99	00	01	02	03	04	05	06	07	08	09	10	11	12	13	14	15	16	17	18	19	20	21	22	23	24	25	26	27	28	29
Leica					M3																																																																											
Leica								M2																																																																								
Leica																	M4							M4		M4-2				M4-P			M6															M6 TTL						MP																										
Leica																						M5																															M7																											
Leica										M1														Leica CL																																									M-A (127)															
Non-Leica	Konica Hexar RF • 35mm Bessa • Cosina Voigtländer • Minolta CLE • Rollei 35 RF • Zeiss Ikon																																																																															
