= Dras (disambiguation) =

Dras is a hill station in Kargil, Ladakh, Kashmir, India

Dras may also refer to:

- Dras River, Dras Valley, Kargil, Ladakh, Kashmir, India
- Dras, Dras-Leona, Alagaësia; a fictional location in The Inheritance Cycle
- Dras volcanic basalts, rocks found in the Indus-Yarlung suture zone

== See also ==
- DRA (disambiguation)
- Drass (disambiguation)
