= Drass =

Drass may refer to

== Places ==
- Drass, Ladakh; a town in India
- Drass river, Drass valley; a river in India
- Drass Field at Scott D. Miller Stadium, Wesley College, Delaware, USA

== Other uses ==
- Drass (company), an Italian submarine and swimmer delivery vehicle manufacturer
- Mike Drass (1961–2018), American football coach

== See also ==
- Dras (disambiguation)
