= Myanmar Restaurant Association =

- မြန်မာနိုင်ငံစားသောက်ဆိုင်လုပ်ငန်းရှင်များအသင်း
- Formation: 2011; 15 years ago
- Headquarters: Yangon, Myanmar
- Location: No. 40/42, Bo Sun Pat Street, Pabedan Township
- Website: myanmar-restaurantassociation.com

The Myanmar Restaurant Association (MRA; Burmese: မြန်မာနိုင်ငံစားသောက်ဆိုင်လုပ်ငန်းရှင်များအသင်း) is Myanmar's food industry association. It was established in 2011 under the supervision of the Ministry of Hotels and Tourism.
