= Malaysia Design Archive =

Archive in Kuala Lumpur, Malaysia

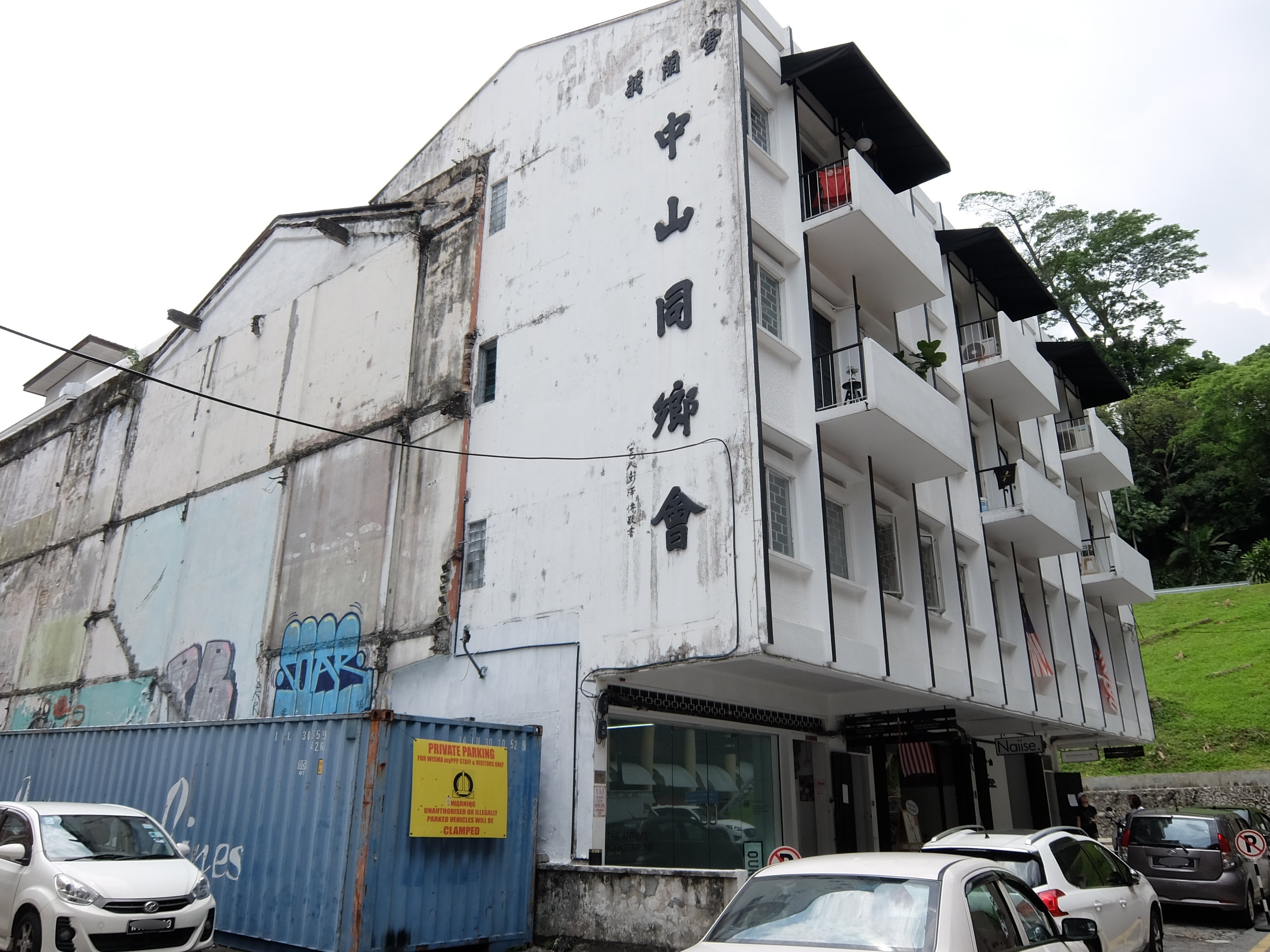
- Zhongshan Building which houses Malaysia Design Archive
- Formation: 2008
- Founder: Ezrena Marwan
- Type: archive
- Location: Kuala Lumpur, Malaysia
- Coordinates: 03°08′16.3″N 101°41′49.7″E
- Website: Official website

The Malaysia Design Archive (MDA) is a non-profit private organization based in Kuala Lumpur oriented towards various projects to document, discuss, and preserve Malaysia's visual culture. Its leading team members are Ezrena Marwan, Jac sm Kee, and Simon Soon. Their core material collection is graphic materials tracing the development of Malaysia from the period before independence (1957) until current times. The collection is housed at their office in the Zhongshan Building, Kuala Lumpur. Access to the collection on site is free and also available via their official website as well as an online database.

== See also ==
- List of tourist attractions in Malaysia
