= Motorcycle Roadracing Association =

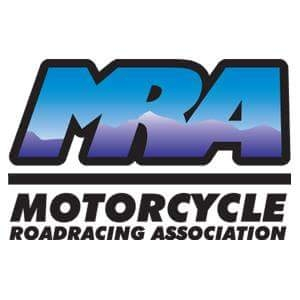

The Motorcycle Roadracing Association (MRA) is a Colorado-based motorcycle racing club operating as a not-for-profit 501(c)(7) organization scheduling and holding competitive motorcycle roadracing events in the local area. Typical membership is composed of racers and associate members. Annual membership usually numbers about 350 with the majority being active racers.

As of 2019, the MRA is an American Motorcyclist Association sanctioned organization which enables competitors to earn points toward MotoAmerica pro racing licenses.

== History ==
Founded in 1973 as the Mountain Roadracing Association, the MRA became the Motorcycle Roadracing Association around 1989 (exact date needed).

In 2013, the MRA was inducted into the Colorado Motorsports Hall of Fame

=== Woody Creek Raceway ===
Although motorcycle racing had been taking place with ad-hoc events at Woody Creek Raceway in Aspen, CO since 1966, the first organized race event was the original MRA event in 1973.

In 1985, the starting grid of the 6 Hour Endurance included (from right to left), Front Row 12 - Ricky Orlando (Yamaha FZ750), 56 - Chuck Lee (Suzuki GS750ES), 2 - Pete Hokenstad (Kawasaki GPz750), 36 - Scott Elledge (Yamaha RZ350); Second Row 5 - John Hopperstad, 714 - Mike Mangham (Kawasaki KZ750), 501 - JT Terry (Honda Interceptor); Third row ??? - Bruce Gibson; Back farther ??? - Mitch Cook, 104 - Jeff Franklin (Yamaha RZ350)

=== Steamboat Motorcycle Week ===
From 1981-1998, the MRA joined with AHRMA to hold one of the biggest combined motorcycle events in the United States through the city streets of Steamboat Springs, Colorado. The event featured historic flat track, trials, motocross, and roadracing culminating in the week ending Sunday event of MRA modern motorcycle sprint road races. The Steamboat road course wound through the streets next to businesses, houses, and condominiums enabling race fans to view the races from their rooms and favorite picnic lunch hillsides. It was the American equivalent of the internationally famous Isle of Man TT but on a smaller course.

During the final few years of Steamboat Motorcycle Week dignitaries such as Dick Mann and Lyle Lovett were seen in the paddock and stands of the races.

As late as 2007, there have been attempts to return motorcycle racing to Steamboat Springs. The MRA has held discussions with the Steamboat Springs town council but nothing has been planned as of yet.

=== Stapleton Airport Runway Racetrack ===
From 1996 - 1998, the MRA used the abandoned northern runways of Stapleton International Airport as a racetrack.

=== High Plains Raceway ===
In 2003, the MRA joined with four automobile racing organizations to form the Colorado Amateur Motorsports Association whose main purpose was to purchase property and construct a permanent road racing facility east of Byers, CO. High Plains Raceway has been in operation since 2009 with the MRA continuing to be a 20% owner of the facilities.

=== Colorado Motorsports Hall of Fame Induction ===
In 2013 the MRA was the recipient of the JC Agajanian Award for outstanding contribution to motorsports by an organization. As a result, the MRA was inducted into the Colorado Motorsports Hall Of Fame in recognition as an organization who has left an indelible mark on motorsports in Colorado and beyond.

== Racing categories ==
Many races are held each weekend and are typically separated based on three criteria.

- Engine displacement & configuration (<400cc, <600cc, unlimited; 4 cylinder, 2 cylinder)
- Motorcycle performance modifications (supersport, superbike, unlimited)
- Rider classification (novice, amateur, expert)

== Championships ==
Points are awarded based on race finishing position and accumulate through the yearly season toward season end class championships. (Seasons are typically 7 race weekends.) Annual "Top 10" number plates are awarded to racers who've accumulated sufficient points in the "Race of the Rockies" unlimited expert only races. This is so the fastest & most consistent racers in the club are recognized by their fellow competitors and fans.
