= Leica CL =

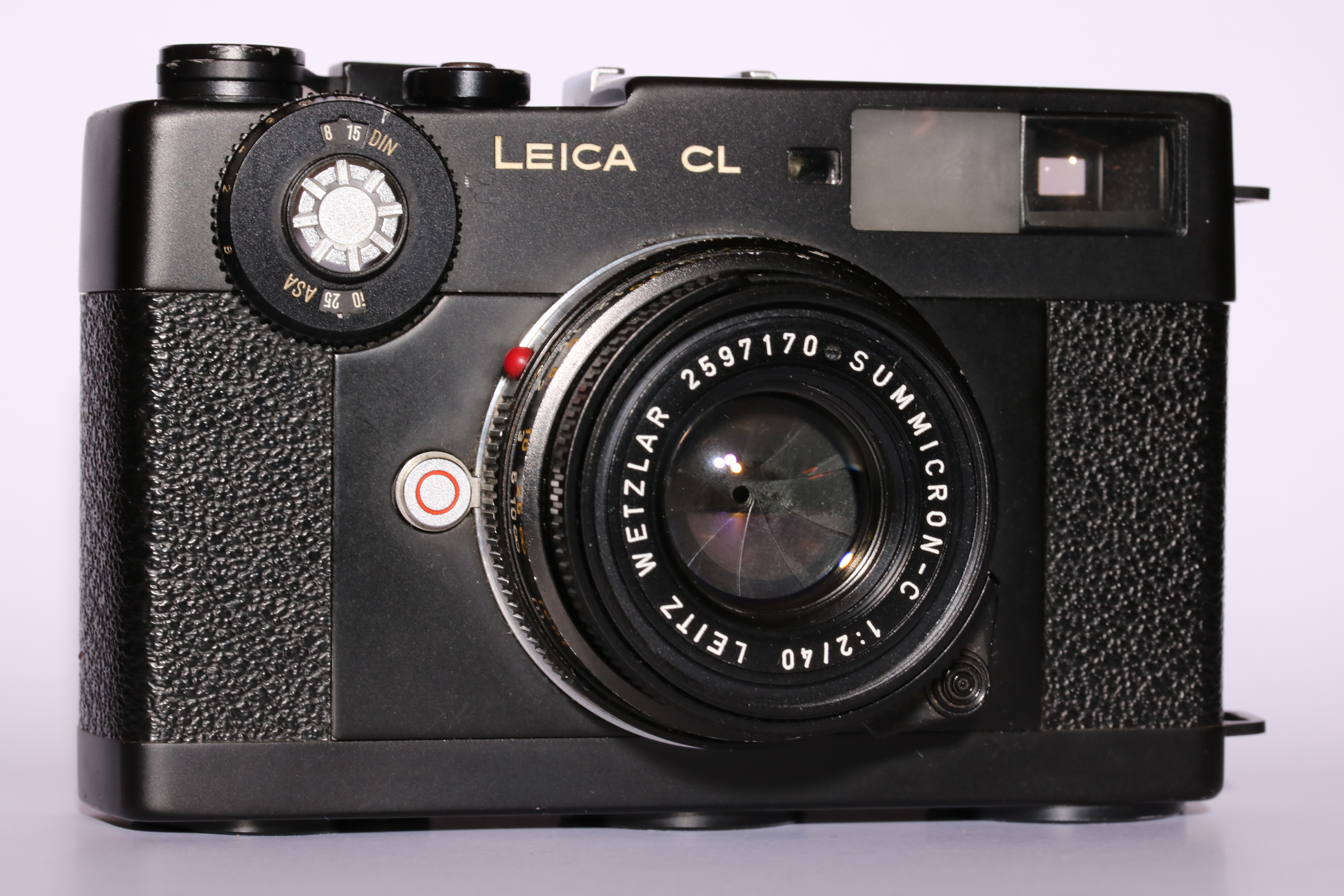
- Leica CL with 40mm Summicron-C lens.

Overview
- Type: 35mm rangefinder camera

Lens
- Lens mount: Leica M-mount

Focusing
- Focus: Manual

Exposure/metering
- Exposure: Manual. Coupled, needle-style TTL meter

Flash
- Flash: Hot shoe

General
- Dimensions: 121 mm × 76 mm × 32 mm (4.8 in × 3.0 in × 1.3 in)
- Weight: 365 g (12.9 oz)

The Leica CL is a 35mm compact rangefinder camera with interchangeable lenses in the Leica M-mount. It was developed in collaboration with Minolta who manufactured it. It first appeared in April 1973 and was released in the Japanese market in November 1973 as the Leitz Minolta CL. Both the Leica CL and Leitz Minolta CL were manufactured in a new Minolta factory in Osaka. In 2017, Leica announced a new digital mirrorless camera, again named Leica CL.

== Description ==
The Leica CL has a vertical-running focal plane shutter, with cloth curtains, giving ½ to 1/1000 speeds. There is a through-the-lens CdS exposure meter mounted on a pivoting arm just in front of the shutter, like the Leica M5. The exposure is manual and the shutter is mechanical. The shutter speeds are visible in the finder. The finder's framelines are for a 40mm, 50mm or 90mm lens. Since the 40mm Summicron-C lens has the same cams as 50mm lenses, the 40mm framelines are always present and the 90mm framelines are automatically selected upon mounting of the appropriate lens, replacing the otherwise also permanently displayed 50mm framelines.

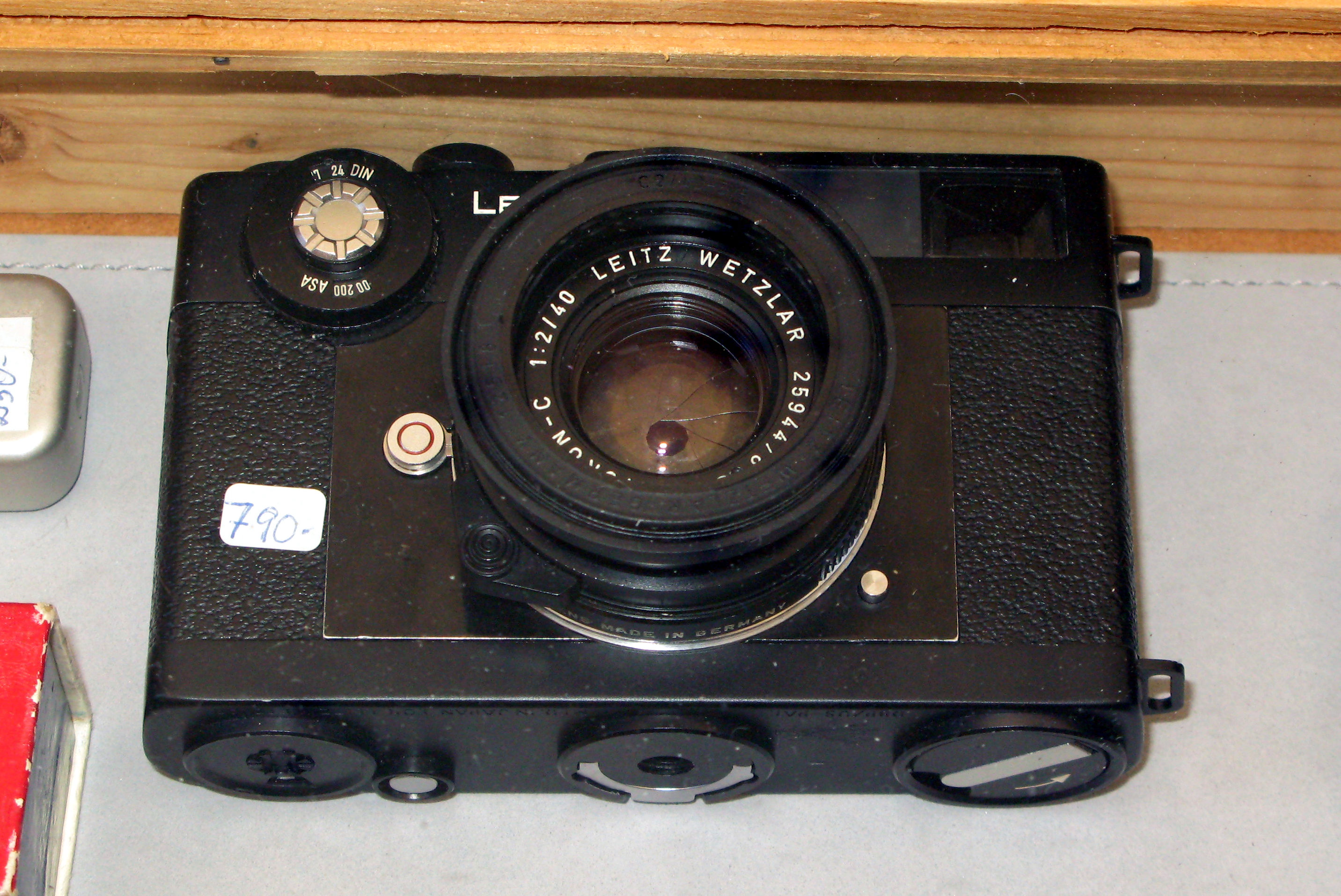
Bottom of the CL

Today the CL is a superbly compact and more affordable camera on which to mount M-mount lenses, but it does not have a rangefinder as precise as that of any Leica M body. The rangefinder base of the CL is 31.5 mm and the viewfinder magnification is 0.60, leading to a small effective rangefinder base of 18.9 mm. This is too short for accurate focusing with some lenses, including the 90mm f/2.8 Tele-Elmarit-M at wider apertures than f/4, or some fast lenses, like 50mm faster than f/2. Some users report the camera is rather fragile, especially the rangefinder alignment and meter mechanism.

== Lenses ==
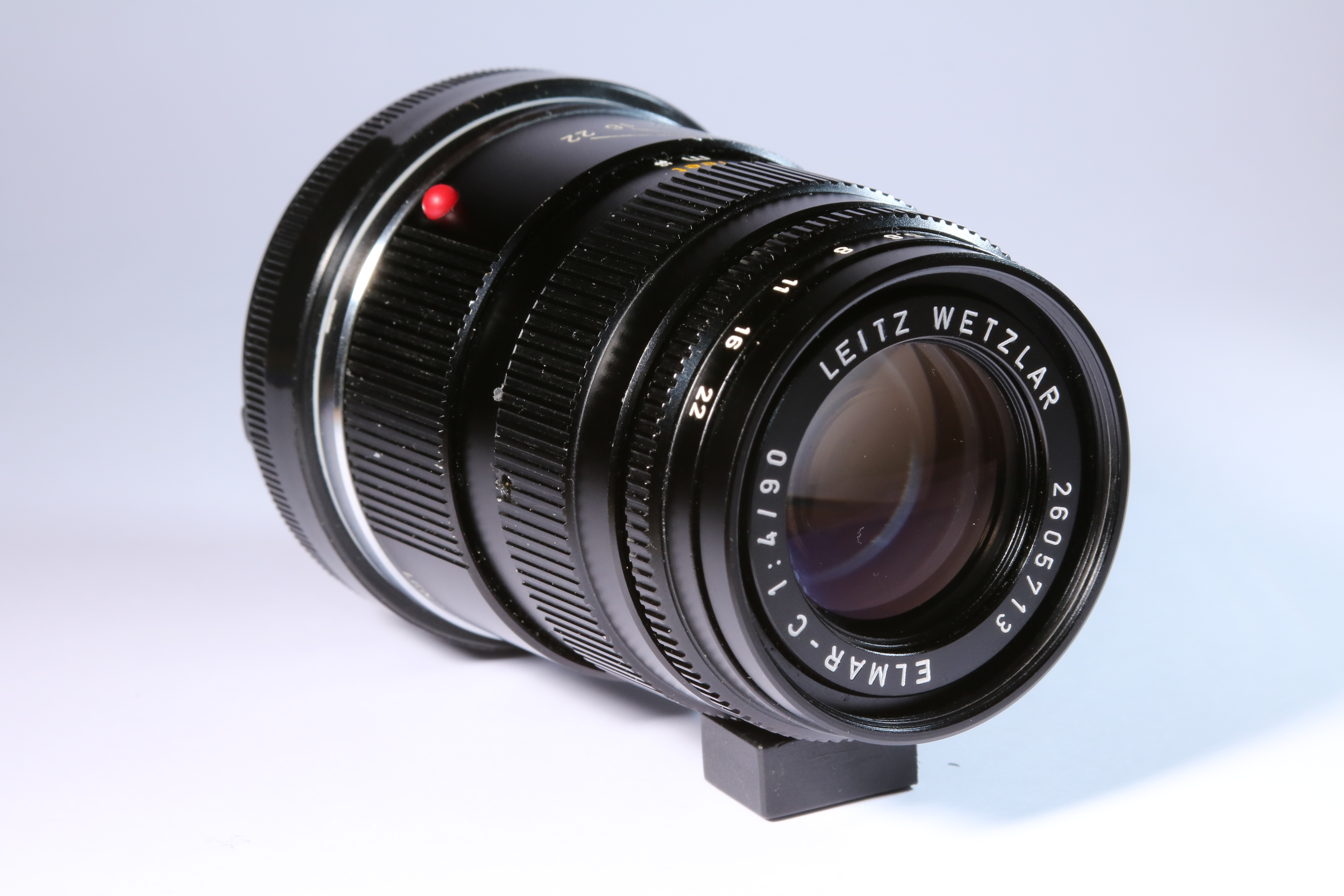
Leitz Elmar-C 90mm f:4 long lens

The CL was sold with two lenses specially designed for it: the Leitz Summicron-C 40mm f:2 sold as the normal lens, and the Leitz Elmar-C 90mm f:4 long lens. Both take the uncommon Series 5.5 filters. A Leitz Elmarit-C 40mm f:2.8 was also briefly produced but it is said that only 400 were made.

The lenses specially designed for the Leica CL can physically mount on a Leica M body, but Leica recommended not doing so because it would not give the best focusing precision, allegedly because the coupling cam of the C and M lenses is not the same. This difference however has no impact on actual focusing precision.

When sold with a Leitz Minolta CL, the lenses were called Minolta M-Rokkor 40mm f:2 (later just Minolta M-Rokkor 40mm f:2) and Minolta M-Rokkor 90mm f:4. It is said that the 40mm was made in Japan by Minolta while the 90mm was made by Leitz and is rare. With the later Minolta CLE, Minolta would produce lenses of the same name but with a different coupling system, the same as the Leica M lenses. A new Minolta M-Rokkor 28mm f:2.8 lens was introduced as well. All these lenses can be mounted on the CL too. Rokkor-branded lenses for the CL and CLE take the more easily found 40.5mm filter size.

The CL can take nearly all the Leica M lenses. Exception are some lenses that protrude deep into the body and could hurt the meter arm, these include: 15mm/8 Hologon, 21mm/4 Super Angulon, 28mm/2.8 Elmarits before serial number 2314921. The eyed lenses, including the M3 wide-angle lenses, the 135mm/2.8 Elmarit, and the 50mm/2 Dual Range Summicron, cannot be mounted either because they are incompatible with the body shape. The 90mm/2 Summicron and 135mm/4 Tele-Elmar are incompatible too. The 50mm f/1 Noctilux is too large and blocks the rangefinder window, making focusing impossible. Some of the collapsible lenses can be mounted but they must not be fully collapsed, and Leitz advised to stick to the barrel an adhesive strip of adequate width, to limit the collapsing movement. At least the 50mm f/2 Summicron (collapsible, Type 1) and 50mm f/3.5 Elmar can be fully collapsed, although, one should avoid releasing the shutter with a collapsed lens mounted. Another limitation is that the rangefinder is only coupled until 0.8m.

== Production ==
Sixty-five thousand serial numbers were allotted to the Leica CL, and this number does not include the Leitz Minolta CL. 3,500 examples of the CL received a special 50 Jahre marking in 1975, for Leica's 50th anniversary. It is also said that 50 demonstration examples were made. They are completely operational, with the top plate cut away to show the internal mechanism.

| Type | 1950s | | | | | | | | | | 1960s | | | | | | | | | | 1970s | | | | | | | | | | 1980s | | | | | | | | | | 1990s | | | | | | | | | | 2000s | | | | | | | | | | 2010s | | | | | | | | | | 2020s | | | | | | | | | |
| Type | 50 | 51 | 52 | 53 | 54 | 55 | 56 | 57 | 58 | 59 | 60 | 61 | 62 | 63 | 64 | 65 | 66 | 67 | 68 | 69 | 70 | 71 | 72 | 73 | 74 | 75 | 76 | 77 | 78 | 79 | 80 | 81 | 82 | 83 | 84 | 85 | 86 | 87 | 88 | 89 | 90 | 91 | 92 | 93 | 94 | 95 | 96 | 97 | 98 | 99 | 00 | 01 | 02 | 03 | 04 | 05 | 06 | 07 | 08 | 09 | 10 | 11 | 12 | 13 | 14 | 15 | 16 | 17 | 18 | 19 | 20 | 21 | 22 | 23 | 24 | 25 | 26 | 27 | 28 | 29 |
| Leica | | | | | M3 | | | | | | | | | | | | | | | | | | | | | | | | | | | | | | | | | | | | | | | | | | | | | | | | | | | | | | | | | | | | | | | | | | | | | | | | | | | |
| Leica | | | | | | | | M2 | | | | | | | | | | | | | | | | | | | | | | | | | | | | | | | | | | | | | | | | | | | | | | | | | | | | | | | | | | | | | | | | | | | | | | | | |
| Leica | | | | | | | | | | | | | | | | | M4 | | | | | | | M4 | | M4-2 | | | | M4-P | | | M6 | | | | | | | | | | | | | | | M6 TTL | | | | | | MP | | | | | | | | | | | | | | | | | | | | | | | | | | |
| Leica | | | | | | | | | | | | | | | | | | | | | | M5 | | | | | | | | | | | | | | | | | | | | | | | | | | | | | | | M7 | | | | | | | | | | | | | | | | | | | | M6 | | | | | | | |
| Leica | | | | | | | | | | M1 | | | | | | | | | | | | | | Leica CL | | | | | | | | | | | | | | | | | | | | | | | | | | | | | | | | | | | | | | | | | M-A (127) | | | | | | | | | | | | | | | |
| Non-Leica | Konica Hexar RF • 35mm Bessa • Cosina Voigtländer • Minolta CLE • Rollei 35 RF • Zeiss Ikon | | | | | | | | | | | | | | | | | | | | | | | | | | | | | | | | | | | | | | | | | | | | | | | | | | | | | | | | | | | | | | | | | | | | | | | | | | | | | | | |
