= DRA =

DRA or Dra may refer to:

== Places ==
- Democratic Republic of Afghanistan, 1978-1987
- Desert Rock Airport (IATA airport code DRA), Mercury, Nevada, USA
- Draco (constellation) (abbreviated Dra)

== Organizations ==
- Defence Research Agency, former UK body
- Delta Regional Authority, for the Mississippi River Delta Region, US
- Deutscher Reichsausschuss für Leibesübungen, later Nationalsozialistischer Reichsbund für Leibesübungen, a former German sports organization
- Deutsches Rundfunkarchiv, the German Broadcasting Archive

== Science and technology ==
- Dielectric resonator antenna
- Dopamine receptor antagonist, first generation antipsychotics
- Dopamine releasing agent, a class of drugs
- Downregulated-in-adenoma, an anion exchanger
- Drag reducing agent, a pipeline flow improver
- Driver's reminder appliance, a UK passenger train safety device
- Dynamic Resolution Adaptation, an audio coding standard
- Dynamic Resource Allocation, a project management tool
- Dave's Redistricting App, an online web app that allows people to draw redistricting maps

== Other uses ==
- (Dra.), feminine-form abbreviation for Doctor (title) in some languages
- Deficit Reduction Act

== See also ==
- Dras (disambiguation)
