= Single use medical device reprocessing =

Single-use medical device reprocessing is the disinfection, cleaning, remanufacturing, testing, packaging and labeling, and sterilization among other steps, of a used, (or, in some cases, a device opened from its original packaging but unused), medical device to be put in service again. All reprocessed medical devices originally labeled for single use in the United States are subject to US Food and Drug Administration (FDA) manufacturing requirements and must meet strict cleaning, functionality, and sterility specifications prior to use.

Although first regulated in the US, the reprocessing of medical devices, particularly those that are labeled "Single Use Device" (SUDs), is now a global practice conducted with regulatory oversight in 19 countries. In 2017, the EU adopted a manufacturing regulatory paradigm, like the US, whereby SUD reuse is now held to the same standards as original equipment. In Europe, SUD reprocessing is often referred to as SUD remanufacturing. Some countries in Asia, Africa, and North America are actively engaged in reprocessing as well.

Currently, approximately 2% of all SUDs on the US market are eligible for reprocessing by a qualified commercial vendor. Reprocessing industry estimates indicate the revenue saved by hospitals that use reprocessed devices to be $468 million in 2021, in addition to diverting over 20 million pounds of medical waste from landfills. Over 10,500 hospitals and surgical centers use reprocessed devices in the US, Canada, Israel, Germany, the United Kingdom, Jamaica and Japan, according to the Association of Medical Device Reprocessors (AMDR). In addition, AMDR advocates for reprocessing for benefits including reduced costs, waste, greenhouse gas (GHG) emissions and greater supply chain resilience.

== History of reprocessing ==
The practice of reusing medical devices labeled for only one use began in hospitals in the late 1970s. After a thorough review by the US FDA in 1999 and 2000, the agency released a guidance document for reprocessed SUDs that began regulating the sale of these reprocessed devices on the market, under the condition that third-party reprocessors would be treated as the manufacturer and would meet the same criteria as the original equipment manufacturers (OEMs) of the medical device. Following the implementation of FDA regulation, the US Congress codified these standards and other requirements in the Medical Device User Fee Act of 2002. Since then, the practice of reprocessing has proliferated around the world, with countries devising their own, similar, regulatory frameworks.

As researchers, regulators, and other healthcare stakeholders have started to pay increasing attention to the environmental footprint of the health sector, the number of countries that regulate reprocessing and the body of research and media supporting the practice have grown.

=== The Single Use Label ===
When a manufacturer designs and develops a product, it determines the materials used and how the device is labeled. In the US, to market a device as "reusable", a manufacturer must provide increased data requirements and invest the resources necessary to demonstrate to FDA that the product can be safely reprocessed at the hospital level. Unlike reusable devices, single-use devices are not sold with instructions on how they can be properly cleaned and sterilized nor have they been validated or tested for exposure to cleaning or sterilization processes, including chemical exposure and heat.

However, the single use label does not mean that a device cannot be safely reprocessed, and over 300 kinds of SUDs have been approved for reprocessing by the FDA and other regulatory agencies around the world.

Hospital skepticism of the single-use label was noted in a 2000 US Government Accountability Office (GAO) Report. According to the report, healthcare personnel "distrust the single-use label for some devices" because, among other things, the regulator "cannot require manufacturers to support the designation of a device as single-use," and "they perceive that manufacturers have an economic incentive to market devices as single-use that could just as well be sold as reusable."

Relatedly, Yale University research has shown that although healthcare providers and staff are interested in reprocessing, some OEMs have pursued strategies to discourage or outright prevent the practice. Health systems reported contractual stipulations by OEMs prohibiting the use of reprocessed devices as well as planned obsolescence in both the software and hardware (such as software chips or chemical coating that renders a device inoperable upon reprocessing).

== Commonly reprocessed SUDs ==
Commonly reprocessed medical devices include lower-risk, US FDA Class I non-invasive devices such as sequential compression sleeves, tourniquet cuffs, pulse oximeter sensors, infusor bags, EKC and ECG leads and cables, and fall alarms to medium-risk, FDA Class II minimally invasive surgical devices including cautery electrodes, laparoscopic graspers, scissors, forceps, scalpels, orthopedic blades, bits, burs, external fixation clamps, bolts and components, and electrophysiological cardiac catheters. To date, the FDA has not approved for reprocessing any Class III, or higher risk, SUDs.

== Safety and efficacy of reprocessed SUDs ==
The Food and Drug Administration (FDA) and the independent US Government Accountability Office (GAO) have concluded that there is no evidence of harm to patients from FDA-regulated reprocessed SUDs. A 2008 GAO report found that of the over 320,000 adverse events filed with FDA between 2000 and 2006, only 65 adverse events "actually involved or were suspected to involve a reprocessed SUD and that the reprocessed SUD was one of several possible causal factors in the adverse event. In reviewing these 65 reports, FDA found that the types of adverse events reported to be associated with the use of reprocessed SUDs were the same types of events that were reported for new devices".^{[15]} The 2008 GAO report concluded: "After reviewing the available evidence – including FDA's process for identifying and investigating device-related adverse events reported to involve reprocessed SUDs, peer-reviewed studies published since 2000, and the results of our and FDA's consultations with hospital representatives – we found no reason to question FDA's analysis indicating that no causative link has been established between reported injuries or deaths and reprocessed SUDs".

In a separate letter from FDA to Congressman Tom Davis and Harry Waxman dated January 23, 2006, FDA indicated that a total of 65,325 reports have been filed between 2003 and 2006 for the malfunction or injury associated with the first use of devices labeled for "single use". The same search produced 176 cases of apparent malfunction or injury associated with reprocessed devices. Upon analysis of the latter reports, FDA determined that these adverse events were not related to the reprocessing of the "single use" device.

Although some studies have shown that certain single use devices are not conducive to the initial cleaning required to achieve sterility via validated methods, these studies tend to be funded by the OEM which has a vested interest in sullying the reputation of reprocessed devices. The chain of custody for the reprocessed devices studied usually runs through the OEM, raising questions about the validity of the studies.

Notably, one 2015 study found that, due in part to the rigorous function testing conducted by professional reprocessing companies, reprocessed devices have lower failure rates than original, non-reprocessed or "virgin" devices.

== Benefits of reprocessing ==
=== Economic ===
FDA-regulated reprocessed devices cost between 25% and 40% of an original device. Currently, reprocessors estimate that a typical 200-bed hospital, if taking advantage of a reprocessor's full product line, can save between $600,000 and $1 million a year and divert between 5,000 and 15,000 pounds of waste from landfills. According to a study by The Commonwealth Fund with funding from the Robert Wood Johnson Foundation and Health Care Without Harm in November 2012, they estimated that from hospitals implementing a reprocessing program, cost savings over five years was about $57 per procedure, and that if hospitals nationwide adopted an SUD reprocessing intervention, cost savings would be $540 million annually, or $2.7 billion over five years. AMDR data shows that, in 2021, hospitals and surgical centers that reprocessed with AMDR member reprocessors saved more than $462 million on device costs and more than $6 million on waste disposal costs.

=== Greenhouse gas emissions ===
Research has shown that the use of reprocessed devices can significantly reduce greenhouse gas (GHG) emissions. For example, a 2021 life cycle assessment of reprocessed electrophysiology catheters found that reprocessing reduced ozone depleting emissions by nearly 90%, and climate change specific emissions by over 50% compared with using an original device. Additionally, research has examined the development of green economic models within the reprocessing industry, such as servitization.

As the healthcare sector accounts for nearly five percent (5%) of global GHG emissions, regulatory agencies including the UK's National Health Service and the US Agency for Healthcare Research and Quality and policy-makers have advocated for reprocessing as part of broader strategies to meet emissions reductions targets.

=== Waste reduction ===
Regulated medical waste (RMW), or "red bag waste", is a waste expenditure that typically costs hospitals 6 to 10 times more to dispose of than regular solid waste. Among the inventory of devices reprocessed annually, ninety-five percent (95%) are recycled at the end of their life cycle rather than sent to landfills. A variety of otherwise reprocessable raw materials that end up in a hospital's RMW include stainless steel, aluminum, titanium, gold, polycarbonate and polyurethane. Reprocessing has allowed some hospitals to divert over 8,000 pounds of RMW from landfills each year, while larger systems can divert more than 50,000 pounds. Worldwide, hospitals and surgical centers that used reprocessed devices diverted more than 20 million pounds medical waste from landfills in 2021.

=== Supply chain resilience ===
More than 33 million medical devices were sold to hospitals for reuse in 2021. These represent devices that did not need to be withdrawn from stocks of new devices. Reprocessing plants can be located nearby medical facilities, providing the latter with reliable access to medical supplies and reducing their dependence on global supply chains.

== Physician and Clinical Statements in Support ==
- American College of Cardiology (ACC) (1999)
- Association for Healthcare Resource and Materials Management (AHRMM) Reprocessing Advisory
- Association of American Medical Colleges (March 2010)
- American Hospital Association (AHA) (2000)
- American Medical Association (AMA), Report of the Council on Scientific Affairs (I-00) (2000)
- American Nursing Association (ANA), (2010)
- Association of periOperative Registered Nurses (AORN), Environmental Responsibility (2006)
- Canadian Medical Association (November 20, 2012)
- Practice Greenhealth
- The Mayo Clinic (with AAOS and AHA), August 2, 2001
- The Royal College of Surgeons of England, (October 2019)
- The Royal Society of Medicine, (February 7, 2020)

== List of Known Regulated Third-Party SUD Reprocessing Vendors ==
Regulated Vendor	Location
Device Science	Shelton, CT
Innovative Health*	Scottsdale, AZ
Mediq	Gauteng, South Africa
Medline ReNewal*	Redmond, OR
MedSalv	Christchurch, New Zealand
NEScientific	Waterbury, CT
ReNu Medical*	Everett, WA
SterilMed, Inc	Maple Grove, MN
SteriPro Canada, Inc	Toronto, Canada
Stryker Sustainability Solutions*	Tempe, AZ and Lakeland, FL
SureTek Medical	Greenville, SC
Sustainable Technologies*	Mansfield, MA
Vanguard (International)*	Berlin, Germany

*AMDR member companies.

The Association of Medical Device Reprocessors (AMDR), based in Washington, DC, is the global trade association consisting of members of the regulated, commercial single-use medical device reprocessing and remanufacturing industry. AMDR was founded in 1997 and the commercial single-use medical device reprocessors in the association now serve a majority of US hospitals, including all the country's Honor Roll hospitals, as ranked by U.S. News & World Report.

== International Regulation of "Single-Use" Medical Device Reprocessing ==
The reprocessing of SUDs is commonplace worldwide. Even in developed nations, including those that have reprocessing prohibitions in place, hospitals routinely reuse SUDs in an unregulated manner. In many cases (particularly in Africa and Asia), uncontrolled reuse of such devices is relatively common, if not the norm. In general, however, in countries where reprocessing is regulated, it is typically subjected to strict regulations to ensure that reprocessed devices meet the same standards of safety and efficacy as non-reprocessed or "virgin" devices. [NS1] The following list provides a "global overview" of regulatory standards governing reprocessed devices around the world:

=== United States ===
The Medical Device User Fee and Modernization Act of 2002 (MDUFMA), and Medical Device User Fee Stabilization Act of 2005 were signed into law on October 26, 2002, and August 1, 2005, respectively. All medical devices including reprocessed devices are subject to premarket review by the US FDA, unless the agency has, by regulation, declared the device to be exempt from premarket requirements. Unless exempt, the lower risk "Class I" and "Class II" devices, whether "original" or reprocessed, are required to have cleared premarket notification submissions ("510(k)s"). With regard to premarket review, reprocessors are subject to more stringent regulation by FDA than are OEMs because MDUFMA, require FDA to withdraw premarket notification exemptions for a significant number of previously exempt reprocessed devices, although "original" devices remain exempt from premarket review. Reprocessors must also validate the cleaning and sterilization methods they seek to use in the reprocessing of a SUD, and include in their 510(k) submissions "validation data [...] regarding cleaning, sterilization, and functional performance" to show that the reprocessed device "will remain substantially equivalent [...] after the maximum number of times the device is reprocessed as intended". Both OEMs and reprocessors are subject to establishment registration and medical device listing; medical device reporting; medical device tracking; reports of corrections and removals, the quality system regulation ("QSR"); and labeling requirements.

=== European Union ===
According to Article 17 of the Regulation (EU) 2017/745 (MDR) on medical devices, reprocessing is only possible if permitted by national law within individual Member States. EU countries have the obligation to notify the European Commission of the national laws on reprocessing of single-use devices introduced by Article 17(3) of MDR. EU countries that permit the reprocessing of single-use devices may maintain or introduce national rules under Article 17(9) of MDR that are stricter than those laid down in the MDR. These national rules have to be notified to the Commission.

Some EU countries do permit regulated reprocessing. Germany is one such example. Since 2001, Germany has had in place a regulatory framework that does not distinguish between the reprocessing of "reusable" and so-called "single-use" medical devices. The guidelines, therefore, allow for SUD reprocessing if conformance with certain standards is achieved. The German Medical Devices Law and the Medical Devices Operator Ordinance regulate the reprocessing of medical devices and in doing so refer to the mutual recommendation by the Robert Koch Institute (RKI) and the Federal Institute for Drugs and Medical Devices (BfArM) for the reprocessing of medical devices. As a result, the RKI's requirements must be observed.

Institutions, which want to reprocess single-use medical devices, must adopt and implement a quality management system according to DIN EN ISO 13485:2007. Compliance with the quality management requirements is monitored annually by "Notified Bodies" that have been accredited by the Central Authority of the Länder for Health Protection with regard to Medicinal Products and Medical Devices (ZLG).

Other Member States, such as France, discourage or prohibit SUD reprocessing.

=== Africa and the Middle East ===
The lack of resources, including medical devices and distribution channels, "necessitates the reuse of single-use devices" in much of Africa. This includes the reuse of syringes and needles that have not been sterilized, and even rubber gloves. In the Middle East, available data indicates that reuse of SUDs is common throughout Arab countries (particularly for cardiac catheters), despite the absence of a regulatory framework. Reprocessing in both Africa and the Middle East is done at the user-facility level.

==== Israel ====
Israel does not have regulations in place specific to the reprocessing of SUDs, but as a general matter, medical devices must be registered with the Ministry of Health (MOH) before they can be sold in the country. If a product is approved by the US FDA, it will generally be registered by the MOH with no further testing requirements and, therefore, may be lawfully marketed in the country. Consistent with this policy, FDA-cleared reprocessed devices have been registered with MOH and are actively imported into the country.

=== Asia/Japan ===
The reuse of SUDs in much of Asia is common, particularly for injection needles. For the most part, there are no national regulations governing reuse of SUDs and, thus, third-party reprocessors do not offer their services in Asia. Rather, most reuse in Asia is conducted in an unregulated-manner at the user-facility level. The exception to this rule would be Japan where, in 2018, SUD reprocessing was subject to the same type of manufacturer regulatory paradigm as in the US.

=== Australia ===
Australia enacted regulations regarding the reprocessing ("remanufacturing" in Australia) of SUDs in 2003. Similar to the US, in Australia, all reprocessors (third-party, hospital, and OEM) must conform to medical device manufacturer requirements as regulated by the Therapeutic Goods Administration (TGA). Prior to implementation of these requirements, hospital reprocessing of SUDs was common.

=== Canada ===
Health Canada since 2016, regulates reprocessed single-use devices from third-party companies as manufacturers, as with the US FDA, Europe and Japan. Hospital reuse of SUDs, however, not done by third-parties, is determined by the territorial and provincial health ministries as well as hospital boards. A number of provinces have adopted similar positions that allow for the reprocessing of SUDs if the third party reprocessor is regulated by the FDA.

==== British Columbia ====
British Columbia issued a policy to its health authorities stating that by January 1, 2008, all health authorities must have eliminated the reprocessing and reuse of critical contact SUDs, unless they have been reprocessed by a licensed third-party reprocessor that is certified by a national regulatory authority such as Health Canada or the US Food and Drug Administration. The policy was revised in 2011 with additional information that sharps (e.g. scalpel blades, drill bits, saw blades, shavers) and needles shall be single-use and shall not be reprocessed.

==== Manitoba ====
Manitoba does not permit hospitals to reuse SUDs in-house, but does permit hospitals to contract with an FDA regulated vendor, among other requirements.

==== Alberta ====
Alberta Health Services issued a policy in 2012 prohibiting the reuse and reprocessing of both critical and semi-critical single-use medical devices.

==== Northwest Territories ====
Since 2005, the Northwest Territories have prohibited reprocessing. Specifically, the Northwest Territories Department of Health and Social Services revised its Hospital and Health Care Facility Standards Regulations to require that "a disposable device intended to be used on a patient during a single procedure shall not be used on a patient for more than one procedure and shall not be used on another patient".

==== Ontario ====
In 2006, the Ontario Ministry of Health and Long Term Care endorsed a guidance document developed by its Provincial Infectious Diseases Advisory Committee (PIDAC) advising that critical and semi-critical SUDs must not be reprocessed and reused, unless the reprocessing is done by a licensed reprocessor.

==== Saskatchewan ====
In 2013, The Saskatchewan Ministry of Health affirmed a policy outlining requirements for hospitals that reprocess SUDs. Consistent with the policies of other provinces, Saskatchewan requires, among other things, that hospitals outsource to an FDA regulated vendor.
