= Leica M1 =

35 mm rangefinder camera by Leica AG

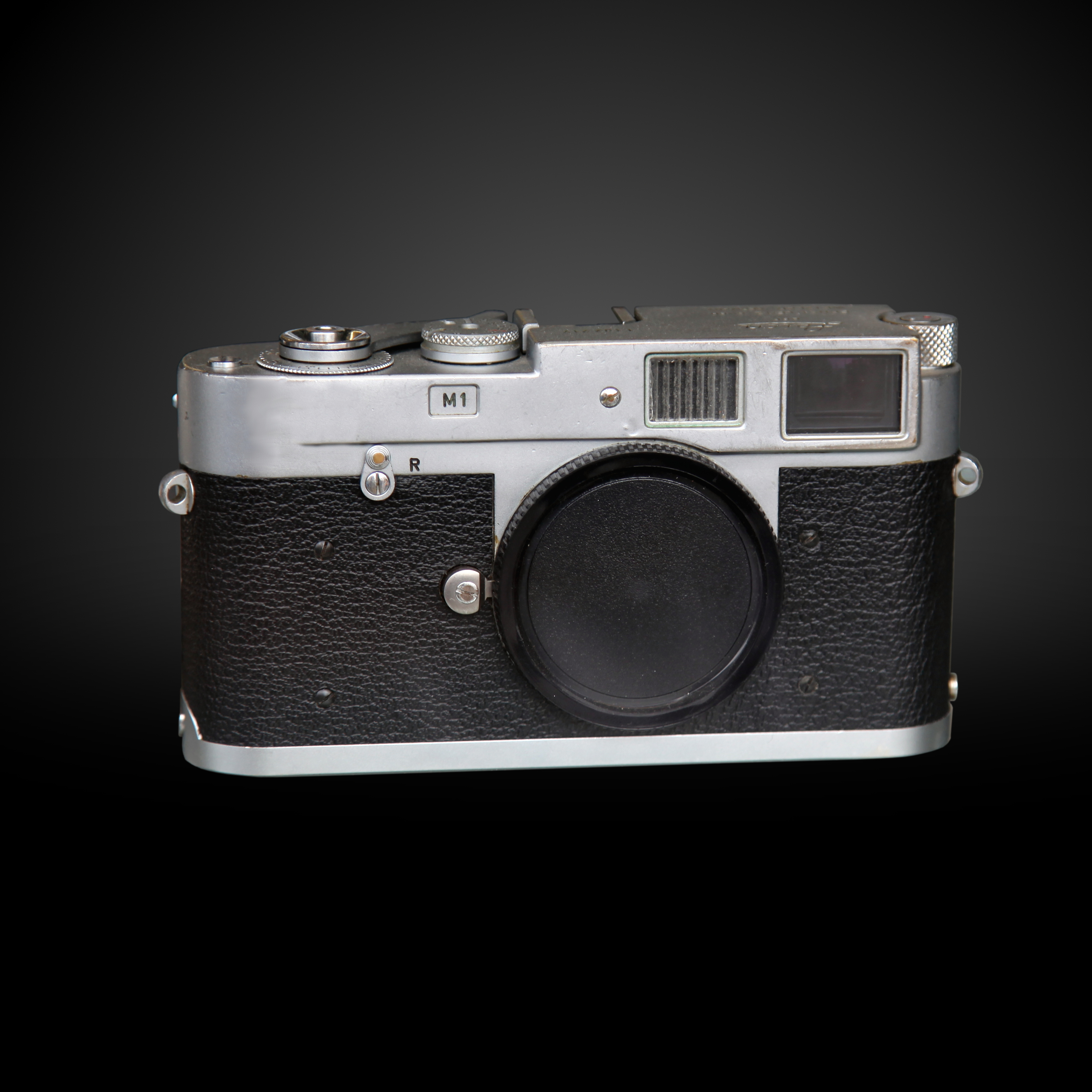
- Leica M1 body

Overview
- Maker: Leica Camera
- Type: 35 mm camera

Lens
- Lens mount: Leica M-mount

Focusing
- Focus: manual

Exposure/metering
- Exposure: manual

Flash
- Flash: none; connectors for external flashgun

General
- Dimensions: 138×77×33.5 mm (5.43×3.03×1.32 in)
- Weight: 545 g (19 oz)
- Made in: Germany

The Leica M1 is a 35 mm camera by Leica Camera AG, introduced in 1959. The M1 has a parallax-corrected viewfinder with frames for 35 and 50mm permanently displayed. It was designed for scientific and military use. 9650 units were produced between 1959 and 1964.

208 of the units were produced for the german army in multiple batches. They are olive as opposed to the standard edition and include the word "Bundeseigentum" (ger: federal property) on the back of the body.

The M1, which followed the original M3 and later M2, was the lowest-cost and simplest Leica M body, a simplified M2 without a rangefinder. It was intended to be used for technical work together with the ground-glass focussing Visoflex, a mirror reflex housing that turns a Leica M into a single-lens reflex camera.

Several similar models were made simultaneously with later M-series Leicas:

- The Leica MD, a simplified M2
- The Leica MDa, a simplified M4
- The Leica MD-2, a simplified M4-2

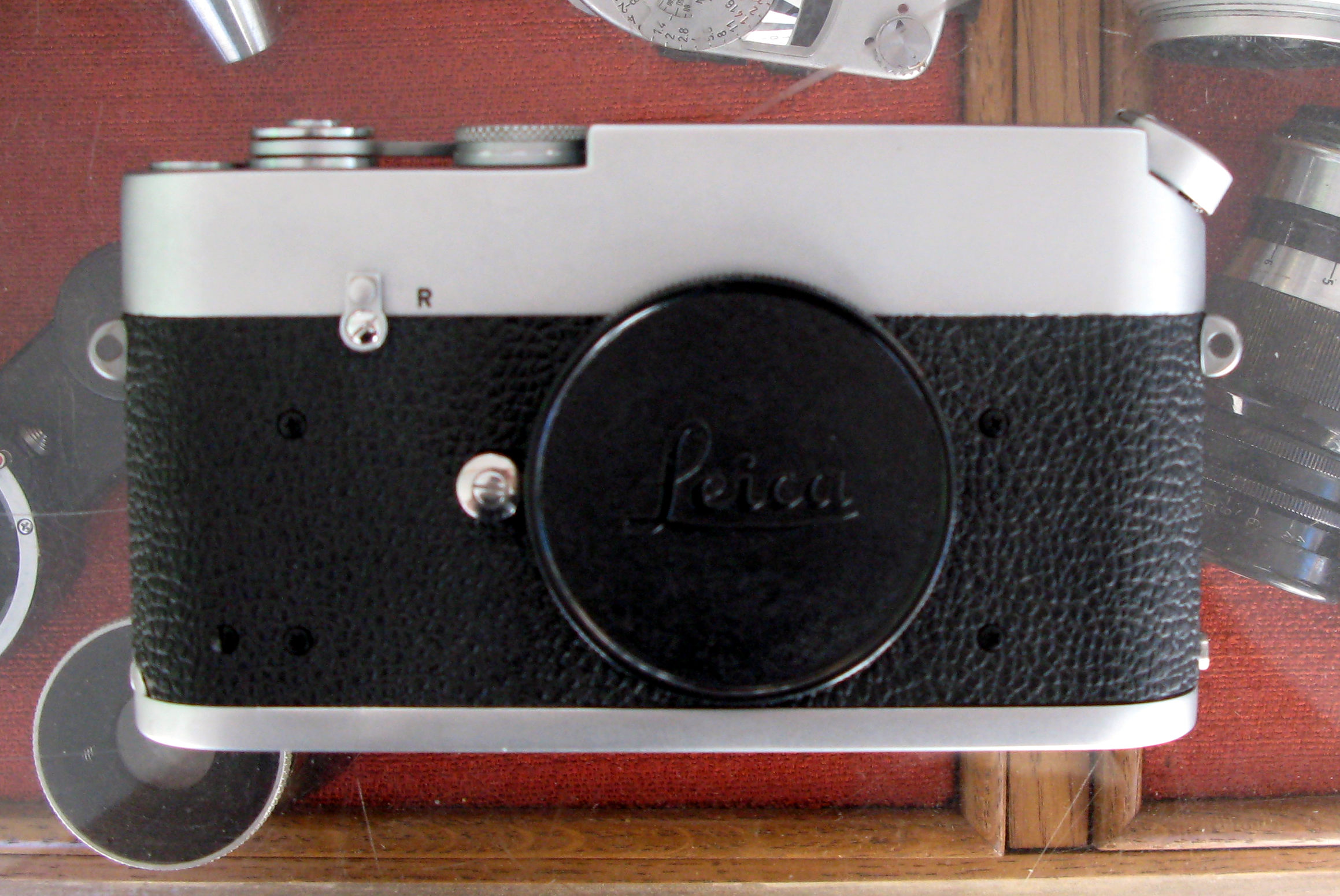
Leica MDa

Type	1950s										1960s										1970s										1980s										1990s										2000s										2010s										2020s									
Type	50	51	52	53	54	55	56	57	58	59	60	61	62	63	64	65	66	67	68	69	70	71	72	73	74	75	76	77	78	79	80	81	82	83	84	85	86	87	88	89	90	91	92	93	94	95	96	97	98	99	00	01	02	03	04	05	06	07	08	09	10	11	12	13	14	15	16	17	18	19	20	21	22	23	24	25	26	27	28	29
Leica					M3																																																																											
Leica								M2																																																																								
Leica																	M4							M4		M4-2				M4-P			M6															M6 TTL						MP																										
Leica																						M5																															M7																				M6							
Leica										M1														Leica CL																																									M-A (127)															
Non-Leica	Konica Hexar RF • 35mm Bessa • Cosina Voigtländer • Minolta CLE • Rollei 35 RF • Zeiss Ikon																																																																															
