= Leica M2 =

35 mm rangefinder camera by Leica AG

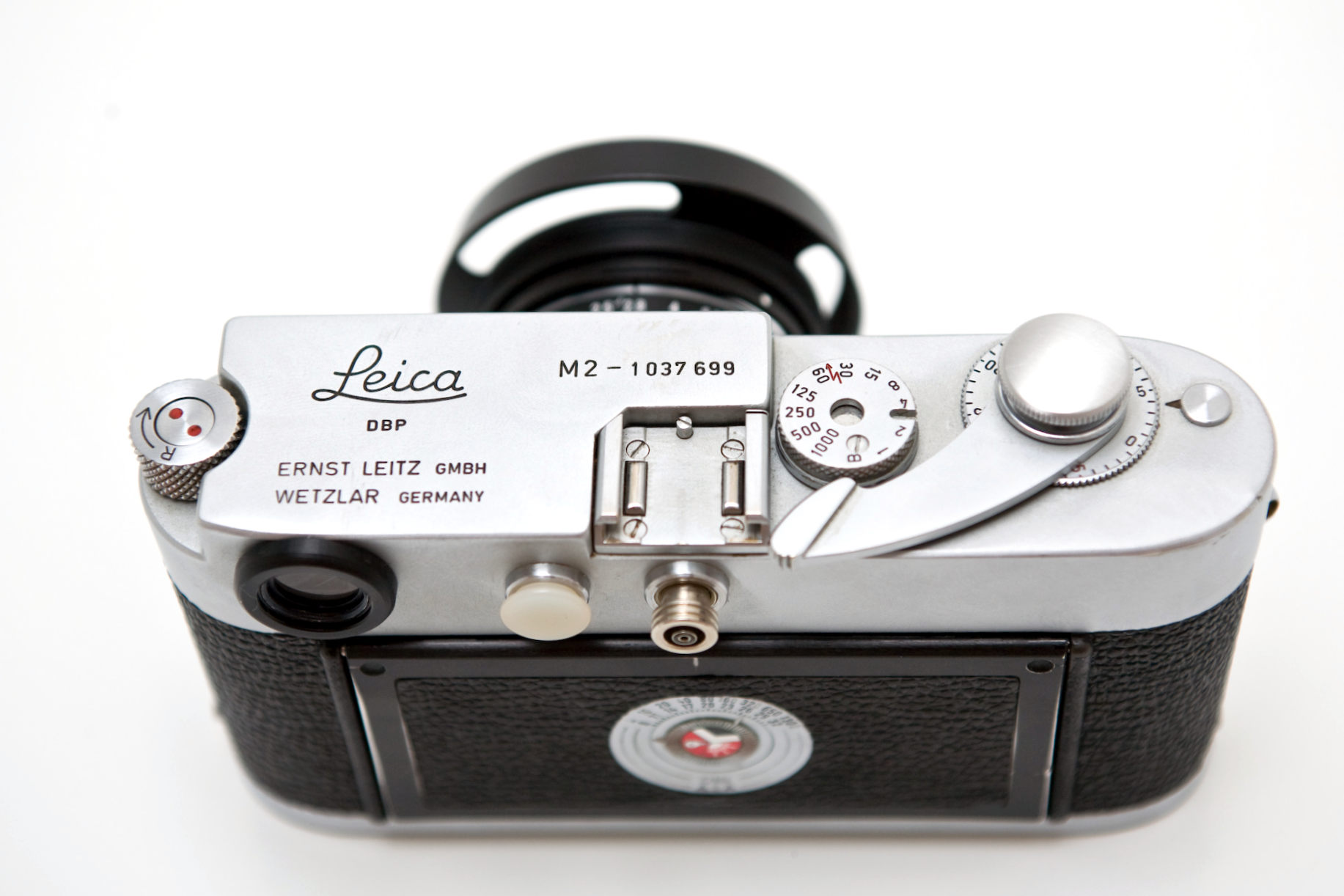

Overview
- Maker: Leica Camera
- Type: 35 mm rangefinder camera

Lens
- Lens mount: Leica M-mount

Focusing
- Focus: manual

Exposure/metering
- Exposure: manual

Flash
- Flash: standard accessory shoe with separate bulb and electronic flash connectors

General
- Dimensions: 138×77×33.5 mm (5.43×3.03×1.32 in)
- Weight: 560 g (20 oz)

The Leica M2 is a 35 mm rangefinder camera by Ernst Leitz GmbH of Wetzlar, Germany, introduced in 1957. Around 82,000 M2s were produced between 1957 and 1968. Around 1500 M2s were produced by Ernst Leitz Canada, but most of these are not marked as such on the top plate.

== Comparisons ==
The M2 was considered to be a more affordable, simplified version of the 1954 Leica M3. Notably, the frame counter of the M2 was composed of a disk plate beneath the film advance lever that had to be manually reset to zero after reloading. This system was close to that of the Leica III series, and unlike that of the M3, which is an independent frame counter, visible through a window in the top plate, that automatically resets to zero when the film take-up spool is removed.

The rangefinder system was also simplified from that of the M3 and this made it potentially more prone to rangefinder flare. The M2 has a rangefinder with a 0.72 magnification and framelines for 35, 50 and 90mm lenses instead of the 0.91 magnification and 50, 90 and 135mm framelines of the M3. This made it better suited for photojournalists who favour shorter lenses or for spectacle-wearers using a 50mm lens who sometimes find it difficult to see the framelines on the M3. The ground glass frameline illumination window of the M3 was replaced with a fresnel-type plastic lens. Finally, the ornate beveling around the various windows on the front of the M3 were flattened on the body of the M2. Unlike the M3, the widest framelines were not always visible so only one set of framelines were ever displayed at one time. All M2s are single stroke advance.

The M2 was followed by the still simpler Leica M1 and then the Leica M4, which used a similar rangefinder design but re-introduced the M3 style frame counter and added a faster loading system and a canted rewind lever.

On the present-day used market the M2, originally intended to be more "affordable", sells at prices only slightly lower than the M3. Both cameras are made to a similar level of quality, and the M2's framelines have proved to be more versatile over time, with all subsequent Leica rangefinder models having 35mm framelines included.

== Variations ==
There are a number of variations of the Leica M2. Although most models have the self-timer lever, it is absent from some earlier models. Also, some early models have a film rewind push-button instead of the typical lever. About 2400 M2s were factory-painted black, but these are relatively rare and more valued by collectors. Near the end of production, Leica also produced a number of M2-R models, which had the faster loading system of the later Leica M4.

== Gallery ==
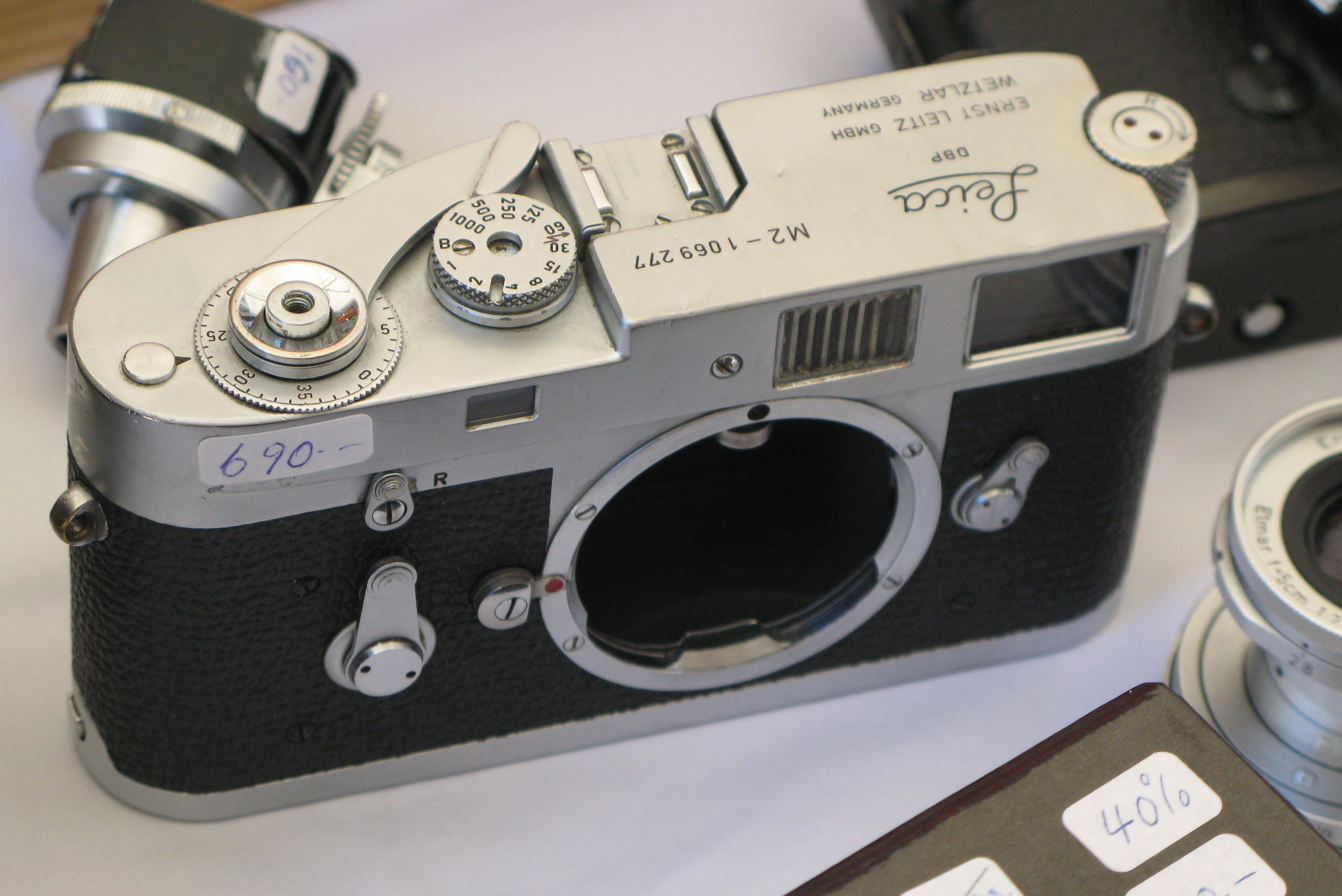
Leica M2 with the signature frame counter well visible

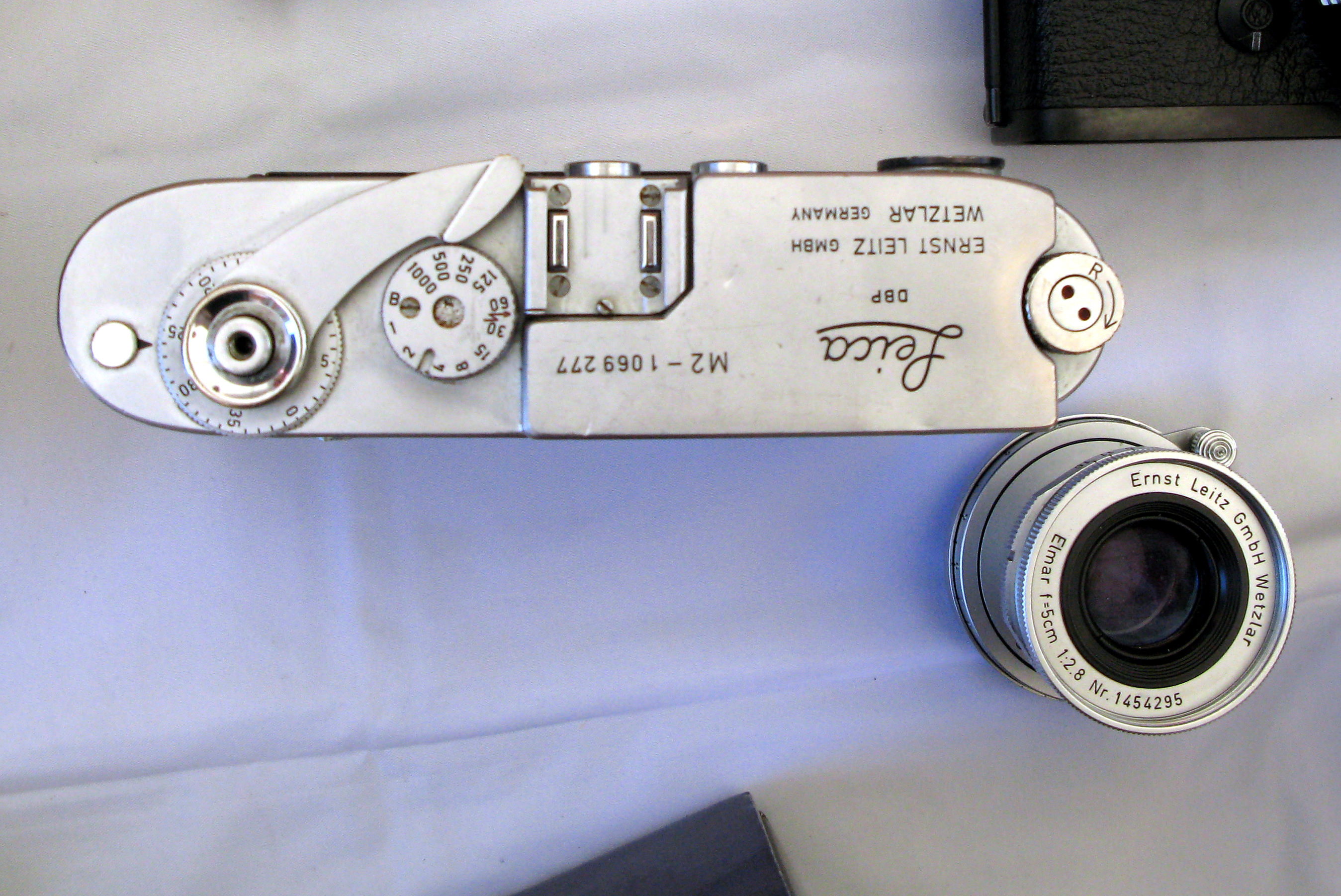

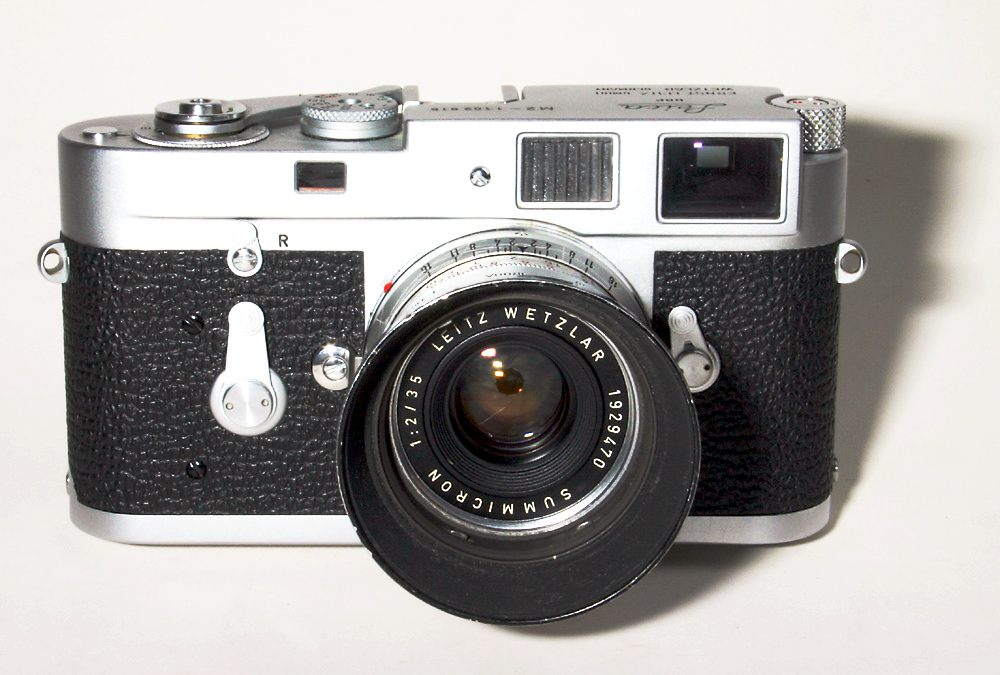

Type	1950s										1960s										1970s										1980s										1990s										2000s										2010s										2020s									
Type	50	51	52	53	54	55	56	57	58	59	60	61	62	63	64	65	66	67	68	69	70	71	72	73	74	75	76	77	78	79	80	81	82	83	84	85	86	87	88	89	90	91	92	93	94	95	96	97	98	99	00	01	02	03	04	05	06	07	08	09	10	11	12	13	14	15	16	17	18	19	20	21	22	23	24	25	26	27	28	29
Leica					M3																																																																											
Leica								M2																																																																								
Leica																	M4							M4		M4-2				M4-P			M6															M6 TTL						MP																										
Leica																						M5																															M7																				M6							
Leica										M1														Leica CL																																									M-A (127)															
Non-Leica	Konica Hexar RF • 35mm Bessa • Cosina Voigtländer • Minolta CLE • Rollei 35 RF • Zeiss Ikon																																																																															
