= RC3 =

RC3, or variants may refer to:

- RC3: River City Cycling Classic, an cycling omnium in Eastern Washington, United States.
- RC3: precision running fits, a class of engineering fit used in the United States
- Republic RC-3 Seabee, an amphibious sports aircraft
- SJ Rc3, a model of SJ Rc class electric locomotive used in Sweden
- State Highway RC-3 (Puducherry), a state highway in Puducherry, India; see List of state highways in Puducherry
- RC3, one of six RC algorithms, symmetric-key encryption algorithms invented by Ron Rivesta
- rC3 (Remote Chaos Experience), remote events of the Chaos Communication Congress in 2020 and 2021
- RC3 or Reginald Cornelius III, a fictional character in Knight Rider (season 4)
- Roberto Carlos, Brazilian former professional footballer

== See also ==
- Release candidate, a software release version with potential to be a stable product
- RC (disambiguation)
- R3 (disambiguation)
- C3 (disambiguation)
