= R2C (disambiguation) =

R2C may refer to:

- Bessa-R2C, 35mm still camera
- Curtiss R2C, racing aircraft
- Regency Systems R2C, Z80-based microcomputer

== See also ==
- RC (disambiguation)
- RRC (disambiguation)
- RCC (disambiguation)
- RC2 (disambiguation)
