= Epson R-D1 =

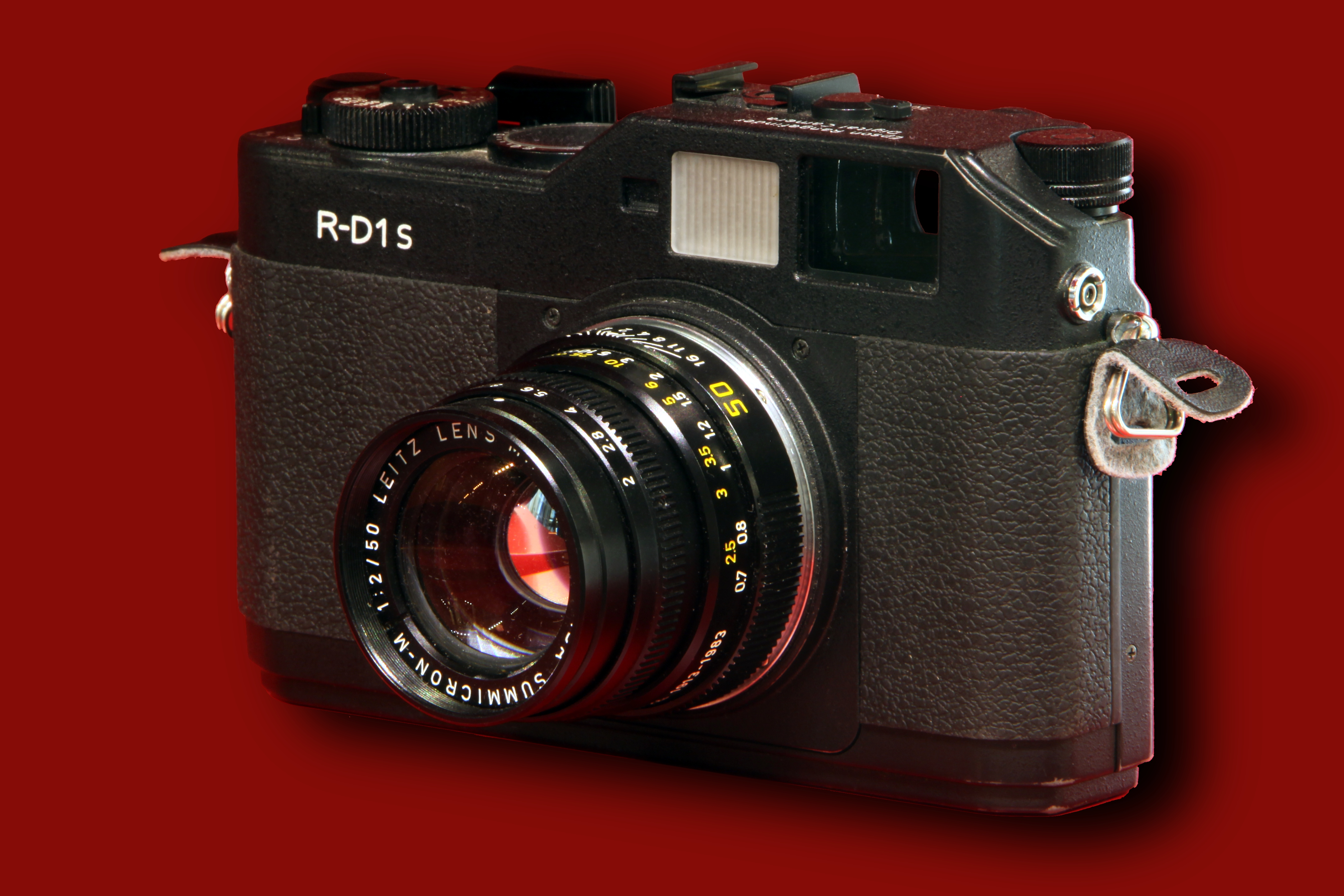

Overview
- Maker: Seiko Epson
- Type: Digital rangefinder camera

Lens
- Lens: Leica M-mount

Sensor/medium
- Sensor: 23.7 x 15.6 mm, 1.53 × CCD APS-C
- Maximum resolution: 6.1 megapixels
- Film speed: ISO 200-1600
- Storage media: SD

Focusing
- Focus modes: Manual

Exposure/metering
- Exposure modes: Manual, Aperture priority
- Exposure metering: Center-weighted

Flash
- Flash: External via hot shoe with full size X-sync port

Shutter
- Shutter: Electronically controlled vertical-run focal plane shutter
- Shutter speed range: 1 to 1/2000 s (X-sync: 1/125 s)

Viewfinder
- Viewfinder: Optical rangefinder (1:1)

Image processing
- White balance: Auto, Sunny, Shade, Cloudy, Incandescent, Fluorescent.

General
- LCD screen: 2 inch 235k Dots
- Battery: Li-Ion EPALB1 Rechargeable
- Dimensions: 142×89×40 mm (5.6×3.5×1.6 in)
- Weight: 560 g (20 oz) (body only, without battery and SD card)
- Made in: Japan

The Epson R-D1 is a digital rangefinder camera introduced by Epson in March 2004, and the first digital rangefinder ever commercially produced. The R-D1 was a joint venture between Epson and Cosina, the former developing the electronics, UI, and imaging processor, and the latter providing the body (a modified version of the Voigtländer Bessa R2 body) and rangefinder mechanics. It uses the Leica M mount.

== R-D1 ==
The R-D1 was jointly developed by Seiko Epson and Cosina and manufactured by the latter, which also builds the current Voigtländer lenses. It uses Leica M mount lenses or earlier Leica screw mount lenses with an adapter.

Uniquely, the R-D1 is a digital camera with a manually-wound shutter actuated by a rapid wind lever. The controls operate similarly to film-based rangefinder cameras.

Settings such as white balance, shutter speed, JPEG quality, and shots remaining are all displayed with servo-driven indicators on a dial resembling a watch face (made by Epson's parent company, Seiko). The rear screen can be rotated 180 degrees inwards towards the camera, allowing it to be fully hidden while folded.

The R-D1 and its subsequent revisions use the Sony ICX413AQ, an APS-C interline-transfer CCD sensor also used in the Pentax *ist D and the Nikon D100. The sensor originally dates back to 2002.

== R-D1s ==
The successor of R-D1, the R-D1s was released in March 2006. The Epson R-D1s is mechanically identical to the R-D1, but with a firmware upgrade. It adds:

- JPEG+RAW mode
- Quick view function
- Adobe RGB mode
- Noise reduction for long exposures

Users of R-D1 could upgrade their camera to have the same functions.

== R-D1x ==
The successors of the R-D1s, the R-D1x and R-D1xG were made available from 9 April 2009 in Japan only. They feature very similar feature set except for few modifications:

- Larger 2.5" LCD (vs 2" in the previous model) but with the same resolution - 235K
- LCD is no longer articulated and cannot be closed
- Support of SDHC memory cards which increased max. capacity to 32 GB (vs. 2 GB for previous models)
- Improvements in accessibility of rangefinder adjustment
- R-D1xG model also includes removable grip

On 17 March 2014, Epson announced that the R-D1x was discontinued.

== See also ==
- List of retro-style digital cameras

Type		2006	2007	2008	2009	2010	2011	2012	2013	2014	2015	2016	2017	2018	2019	2020	2021	2022
Leica	M		M8			M9/ M9-P			M (240)/ M-P (240)				M10/ M10-P					M11
Leica	ME								M-E (220)			M (262)				M-E (240)		
Leica	MM								MM			MM (246)				M10M		
Leica	MD												M-D (262)		M10-D			
Leica	MR																M10-R	
Non-Leica		Epson R-D1 • Zenit M																
