= Rollei 35 RF =

The Rollei 35 RF is a version of the Cosina Voigtländer Bessa R2 marketed by Rollei Fototechnic, but manufactured by Cosina, and released in 2002.

Like the Bessa R2, the Rollei 35 RF has a Leica M-mount and a metal focal-plane shutter. Its TTL exposure meter requires batteries, but batteries are not otherwise needed. Shutter speeds range from 1 to 1/2000 s and bulb (B), with flash sync at 1/125 s on hot-shoe or PC terminal.

Upon release, the most obvious differences from the R2 were the higher price and the slightly different appearance: more silver, and more prominent branding. On the technical side, the shutter speed knob and the grip on the body are slightly redesigned and the framelines are for 40, 50, and 80 mm.

Because of its high price tag and similarity to other contemporary Cosina products, it was treated without much fanfare during its original release. Nowadays it remains a popular Bessa camera for people who wear glasses and primarily use a 40 mm lens.

== See also ==
- Rollei 35RF, an unrelated namesake
- Rollei 35

Type	1950s										1960s										1970s										1980s										1990s										2000s										2010s										2020s									
Type	50	51	52	53	54	55	56	57	58	59	60	61	62	63	64	65	66	67	68	69	70	71	72	73	74	75	76	77	78	79	80	81	82	83	84	85	86	87	88	89	90	91	92	93	94	95	96	97	98	99	00	01	02	03	04	05	06	07	08	09	10	11	12	13	14	15	16	17	18	19	20	21	22	23	24	25	26	27	28	29
Leica					M3																																																																											
Leica								M2																																																																								
Leica																	M4							M4		M4-2				M4-P			M6															M6 TTL						MP																										
Leica																						M5																															M7																											
Leica										M1														Leica CL																																									M-A (127)															
Non-Leica	Konica Hexar RF • 35mm Bessa • Cosina Voigtländer • Minolta CLE • Rollei 35 RF • Zeiss Ikon																																																																															
