= RCRC =

RCRC may refer to:

== Organizations ==
- Religious Coalition for Reproductive Choice
- Royal Commission for Riyadh (RCRC: Royal Commission for Riyadh City), Saudi Arabia
- Red Cross and Red Crescent (RC/RC), see International Red Cross and Red Crescent Movement
- River City Rowing Club at Washington Lake (California)

== Other uses ==
- Residual Cashflow Reallocation Cashflow, calculated for electricity billing in the UK

== See also ==
- RC (disambiguation)
- RC2 (disambiguation)
