= RCC =

RCC can stand for:

== Buildings ==
- Rail City Casino, a casino located in Sparks, Nevada
- Redcar Central railway station, England; National Rail station code RCC
- Russian Cultural Center in Washington, D.C., United States

== Education ==
- Rachel Carson Center for Environment and Society, Munich, Germany
- RCC Institute of Information Technology, India
- RCC Institute of Technology, Toronto, Ontario, Canada
- Recaredo Castillo College, Surigao del Sur, Philippines
- Regional Computer Center, regional educational institutions located across India
- Riverside Community College District, or RCCD, headquartered in Riverside, California, United States
  - Riverside City College, an RCCD campus located in Riverside
- Rockingham Community College, Wentworth, North Carolina, United States
- Rockland Community College, Ramapo, New York, United States
- Rogue Community College, Rogue Valley region of Oregon, United States
- Roxbury Community College, in Boston, Massachusetts, United States
- Royal College of Chemistry, London, England
- Royal College Curepipe, Mauritius
- Royal College, Colombo, Sri Lanka

== Medicine ==
- Renal cell carcinoma
- Red cell count, in a complete blood count

== Organizations ==
=== Revolutionary Command Councils ===
- Egyptian Revolutionary Command Council
- Iraqi Revolution Command Council
- Libyan Revolutionary Command Council
- Syrian Revolutionary Command Council
- Revolutionary Command Council for National Salvation in Sudan

=== Other organizations ===
- Radio Communications Committee of the IEEE Communications Society
- Rape Crisis Centers in the United States
- Range Commanders Council of the Inter-Range Instrumentation Group
- RCC Broadcasting, a Japanese commercial broadcaster
- Red Cross of Constantine, the common colloquial name of a Masonic order
- Regional Cancer Centre (India)
- Regional Congress Committees of the Indian National Congress, as in Mumbai Regional Congress Committee
- Rescue coordination centre
- Roman Catholic Church
- Rwanda Cinema Centre, Kigali, Rwanda

== Sport ==
- Richmond Cricket Club, an English cricket club
- Richmond Cricket Club, an Australian cricket club, now known as Monash Tigers
- Ringwood Cricket Club, an Australian cricket club

== Substances ==
- Reinforced carbon–carbon
- Reinforced cement concrete
- Roller-compacted concrete

== Technology ==
- Radio common carrier, a service provider for public mobile service
- Radio-controlled clock
- Ringing choke converter, a switched-mode power supply
- Recompression chamber, a chamber used to treat divers from decompression sickness
- Remote center compliance, a device used in robotic assembly
- Resource Compiler, a QT tool

== Other uses ==
- RecentChangesCamp, an "unconference" focused on wikis, held 2006 to 2012
- Red Carpet Club, former name of United Airlines airport lounges
- Region connection calculus, used for spatial-temporal reasoning
- Relaxed Chebyshev center, a term in geometry
- Rescue coordination centre, a primary search and rescue facility
- River continuum concept, a model for classifying and describing flowing water

== See also ==
- RC2 (disambiguation)
- R2C (disambiguation)
- RC (disambiguation)
