= RRC =

RRC may stand for the following:

== Military units ==
- Regimental Reconnaissance Company, within the 75th Ranger Regiment of the U.S. Army, established in 1984
- Royal Regiment of Canada, a Canadian Army regiment established in 1862
- Royal Rifles of Canada, a Canadian Army regiment active from 1862 to 1966

== Organizations ==
- Railroad Commission of Texas
- Range Resources, an American natural gas exploration and production company (NYSE: RRC)
- Reconstructionist Rabbinical College in Wyncote, Pennsylvania
- Regional Radiocommunication Conference of the International Telecommunication Union
- Relief and Rehabilitation Commission of Ethiopia
- Road Runners Club (UK), an association formed in 1952
- Rubber Reserve Company, pre-World War II US government agency that stockpiled reserves of natural rubber

== Technology ==
- Radio Resource Control, a concept and a protocol name for a set of control messages
- Rolling resistance coefficient
- Root-raised-cosine filter, used in digital communication systems

== Other uses ==
- Rbai Rafid Collection (RRC), a private collection of Mandaic manuscripts in Nijmegen, Netherlands
- Roman Republican Coinage, a reference work on Roman Republican currency written by Michael H. Crawford
- Royal Red Cross, a United Kingdom and Commonwealth military decoration; recipients may use the postnominal "RRC"

== See also ==
- RC (disambiguation)
- R2C (disambiguation)
