= RC2 (disambiguation) =

RC2 or RC-2 may refer to:

- FIA RC2, a class of rally racing car used for Group Rally2
- RC2 (originally Ron's Code 2, later Rivest Cipher 2), a symmetric key block cipher designed by Ron Rivest
- RC2 Corporation, a U.S. toy company
- Rc2, a variant of the SJ Rc electric locomotive
- Republic RC-2 Rainbow, an unbuilt 1940s airliner
- Software release candidate 2

== See also ==
- RC (disambiguation)
- R2C (disambiguation)
- RCC (disambiguation)
- RCRC (disambiguation)
