= Ultron (disambiguation) =

Ultron is an android supervillain in the Marvel Comics universe.

- Avengers: Age of Ultron, 2015 film featuring Ultron

Ultron may also refer to:

- Ultron, a fictional device in the Star Control computer game series
- Ultron, the name of the home planet of superhero Thermoman in the British comedy series My Hero
- Petron Ultron, a brand name of gasoline engine oils in the Philippines by Petron Corporation
- A model name used for various camera lenses manufactured by Cosina Voigtländer
