= Cosina =

Japanese optical equipment manufacturer

Cosina Co., Ltd.

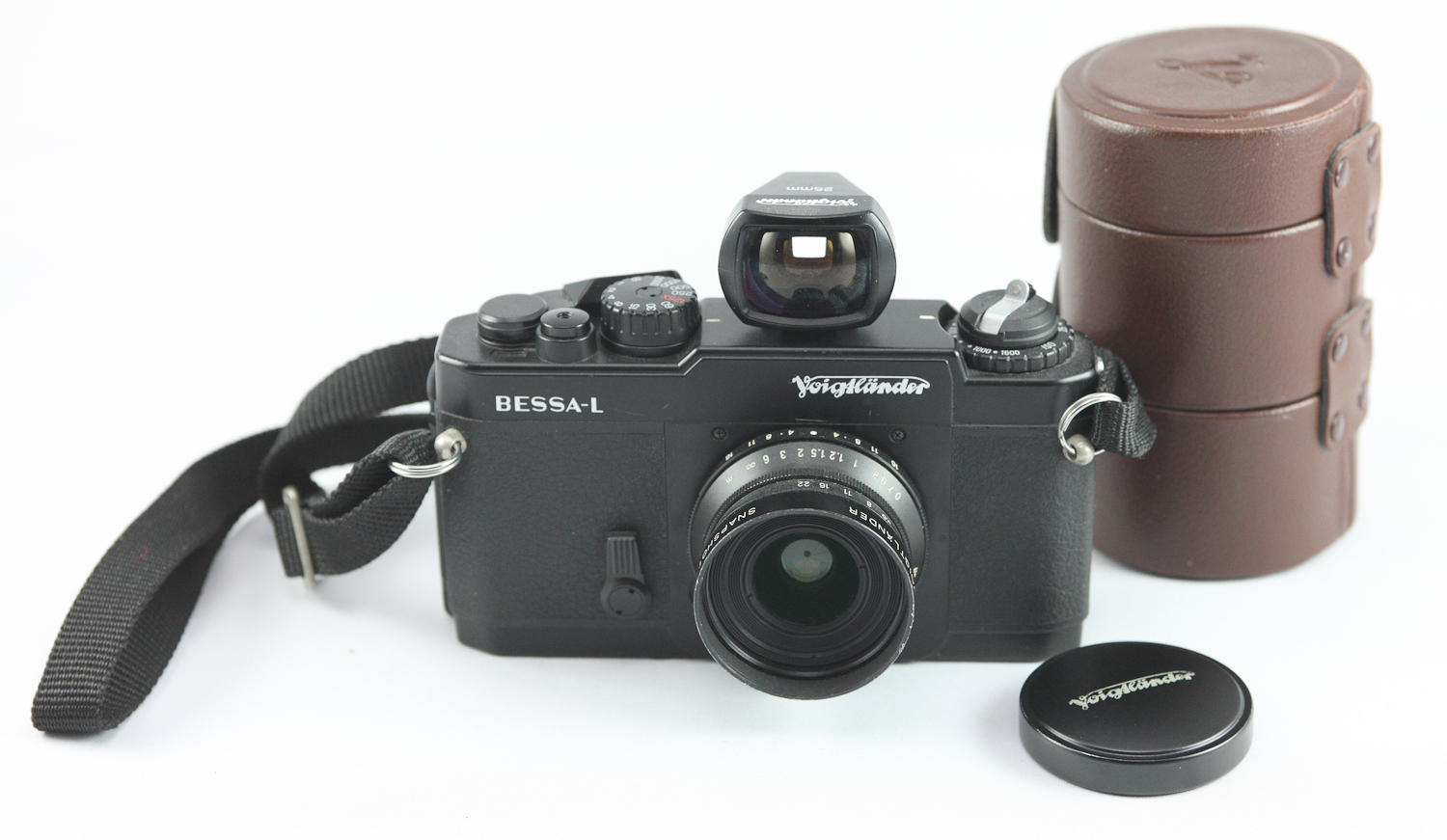
- Voigtländer Bessa L camera and Voigtländer Snapshot-Skopar 25mm f4.0 lens: manufactured by Cosina in Japan
- Native name: 株式会社コシナ
- Romanized name: Cosina Co., Ltd.
- Formerly: K.K. Nikō
- Type: Kabushiki Kaisha
- Industry: High-end optical devices and camera manufacturer
- Founded: February 2, 1959; 67 years ago in Japan
- Headquarters: Nakano, Japan
- Key people: Hirobumi Kobayashi
- Number of employees: 520 (2017)
- Website: www.cosina.co.jp

Cosina Co., Ltd. (株式会社コシナ, Kabushiki-gaisha Koshina) is a manufacturer of high-end optical glass, optical precision equipment, cameras, video and electronic related equipment, based in Nakano, Nagano Prefecture, Japan.

== History ==
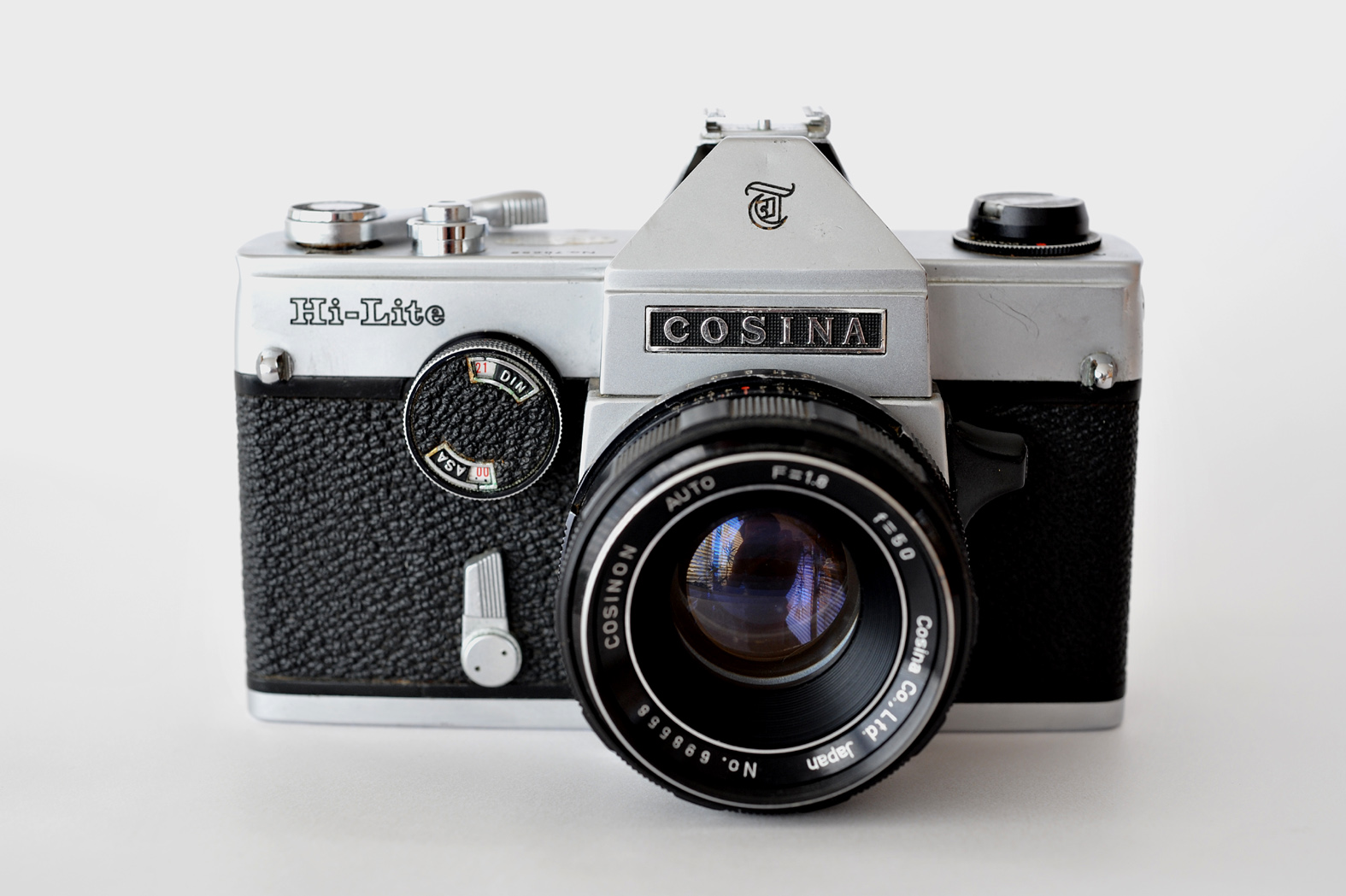
Cosina Hi-Lite

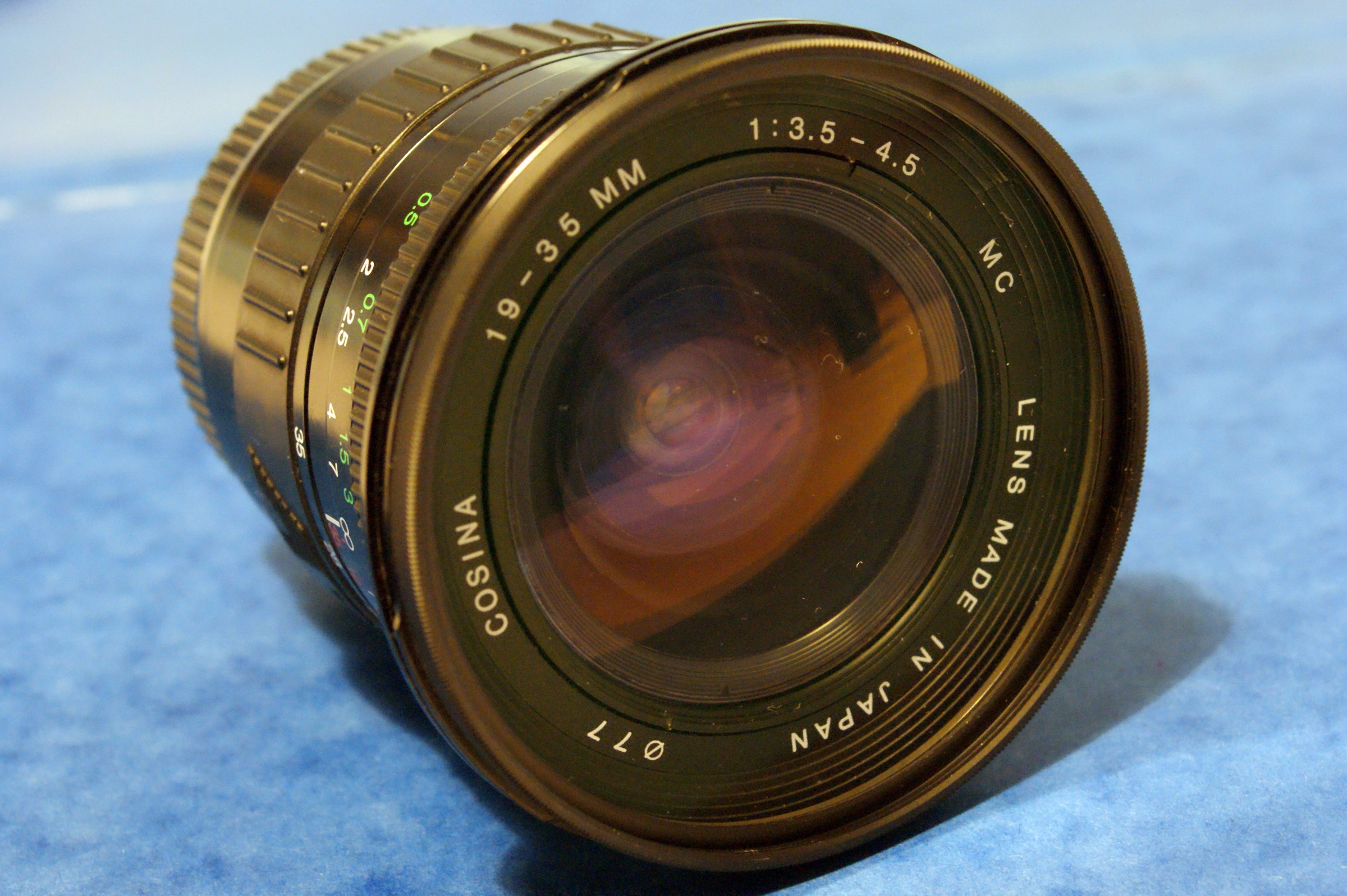
Cosina 19–35 f/3.5-4.5 AF lens

Cosina is the successor to Nikō (or "Nikoh"), a company set up as a lens processing factory in February 1959, which was a pioneer in optical polishing and lens grinding in Japan. In 1966, it also began manufacturing 35 mm compact cameras and 8 mm cine cameras, and a year later started the manufacture of 35mm film SLR cameras. In 1968, it started a glass melting factory. Nikō changed its name to Cosina in 1973. (The first part of the name is a reference to the Koshi area within Nakano, where the founder came from; while the 'Na' represents Nakano.)

The name Cosina has previously appeared on compact and SLR cameras for 135 film. The CS-2 and CS-3 SLRs were introduced in 1978, followed in 1980 by the CT-1, CT-7 (the world's first all—push-button SLR), CT-10 and CT-20, the CT-1G in 1982 and the CT-9 in 1986. Cosina SLR cameras used either the M42 (Praktica/Pentax) lens mount or the Pentax K (bayonet) lens mount. However, Cosina is probably better known as a manufacturer of cameras and camera components for other brands, including the popular Yashica FX-3, FX-3 Super, and Super 2000. During the late 1970s, Cosina made a name for itself in 35 mm rangefinder cameras with a well-built, high quality fixed-lens camera using an aluminum body and a simple shutter-priority autoexposure system. This rangefinder camera was adopted as the basic chassis for several excellent camera models, including the Minolta 7SII, Revue 400 SE, Prinz 35 ER, and Vivitar 35 ES.

In 1982, Cosina began to manufacture lenses in a variety of SLR manufacturers' lens mounts. In 1991, it started to produce glass molded aspheric lenses, and in 1996 plastic molded aspherical lenses. Cosina began producing digital cameras in 1997.

=== Voigtländer brand acquisition ===
At about this time, plans were started to produce a new high-quality rangefinder 35 mm film camera, complete with wide and ultrawide lenses for the Leica screw mount, and also a standard 35 mm film camera for the amateur film photography sector — similar to a rangefinder camera, but without a rangefinder or viewfinder — for mounting these lenses.

In 1999, Cosina secured partial rights to the German, once Austrian, classic camera brand "Voigtländer", acquired from RINGFOTO GmbH & Co. ALFO Marketing KG in Germany, to produce the Classic Collection (high-quality lenses with both M39 screw thread and Leica M bayonet, 35mm film cameras Bessa R, Bessa L, Bessa T, and medium format cameras Bessa III). Cosina first introduced the Voigtländer 15 mm f/4.5 and 25 mm f/4 lens (neither of them rangefinder-coupled) and the Voigtländer Bessa-L standard camera body. It quickly followed with a wider range of Voigtländer cameras (starting with the Bessa-R, with viewfinder and rangefinder, and the Bessa-T, with rangefinder, but no viewfinder), and a set of lenses, including the Heliar 12 mm f/5.6 lens, which on its introduction was the widest rectilinear lens ever marketed for still photography.

On April 26, 2010, Cosina joined the Micro Four Thirds System Standard Group.

In 2016, Cosina manufactured a Nokton 1,4/ 58 mm after 2003 a second time. For this lenses a Topcon-construction was used.

== Voigtländer ==
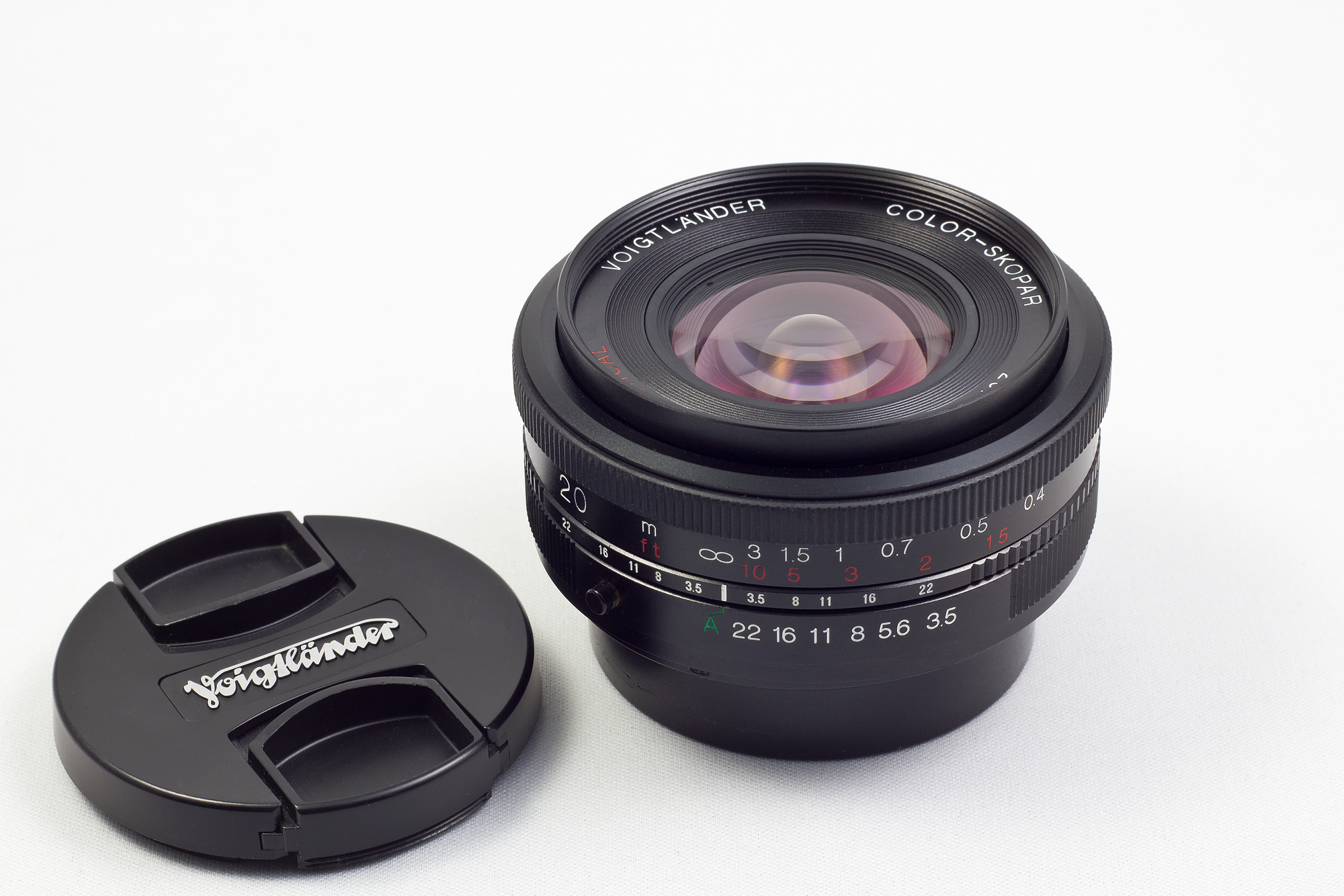
Wide angle lens Cosina Voigtländer 20mm f/3.5 Color-Skopar SL II Aspherical

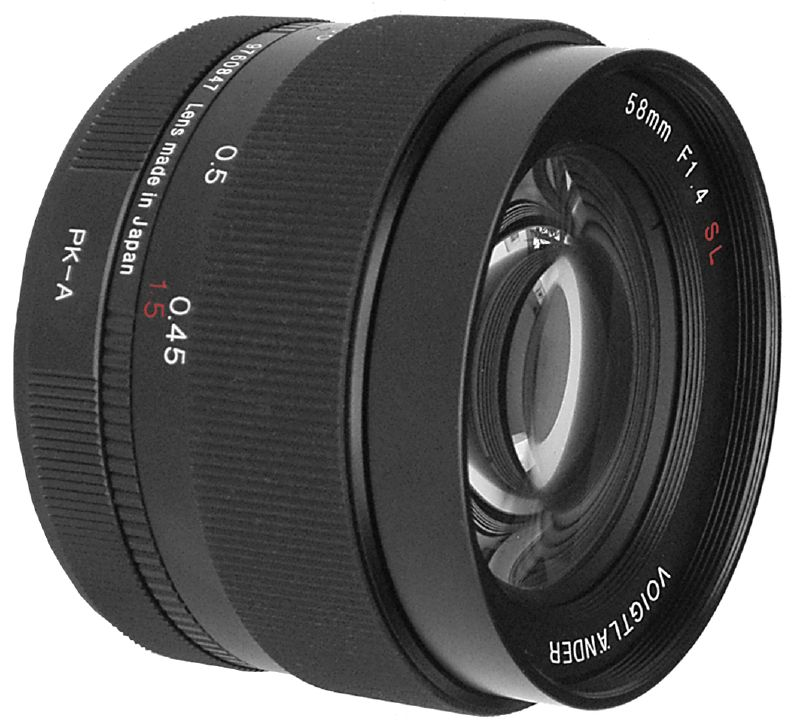
Nokton 1,4/ 58 mm

Cosina's "Voigtländer" products are sometimes referred to as Cosina Voigtländer.

The Cosina Voigtländer cameras and lenses have been of great personal interest to Kobayashi Hirofumi (小林博文) (b. 1953), the President of Cosina since the death in 1988 of his father Kobayashi Bunjirō (小林文治郎), the founder. The name Cosina now appears (conspicuously) on lenses for various SLR mounts, and less conspicuously on a widening range of cameras and lenses with the Voigtländer brand. Cosina manufactured the rangefinder camera Rollei 35 RF for Rollei Fototechnic, and is acknowledged to have manufactured (and to have helped design) the Epson digital rangefinder camera R-D1 as well. Its manufacture of a new Zeiss Ikon rangefinder camera with Leica M-mount, and Zeiss lenses in Leica bayonet mount, was announced in October 2004, and had begun producing these by April 2006.

== Other manufacturers ==
=== Cameras ===
Cosina is also well known for manufacturing 35 mm SLR cameras to the specifications of other manufacturers and distributors, such as the Canon T60, the Nikon FM10 and FE10, the Olympus OM2000, Konica TC-X, Yashica FX-3 and FX-3 Super, and various Vivitar models. For this models the CT-1 was used.

A Cosina design, the 1982 Cosina CX-2, was copied by the Russian optical firm LOMO as the popular Lomo LC-A.

=== Lenses ===
Cosina manufactures manual focus SLR lenses for Carl Zeiss AG with: Leica (ZM), Nikon (ZF), Pentax (ZK), Canon EOS (ZE), and M42 (ZS) lens screw mounts.

== Distribution ==
Cosina products are distributed in Japan by Kenko.

== See also ==
- List of photographic equipment makers
