= 35 mm Bessa =

Family of cameras by Cosina Voigtländer

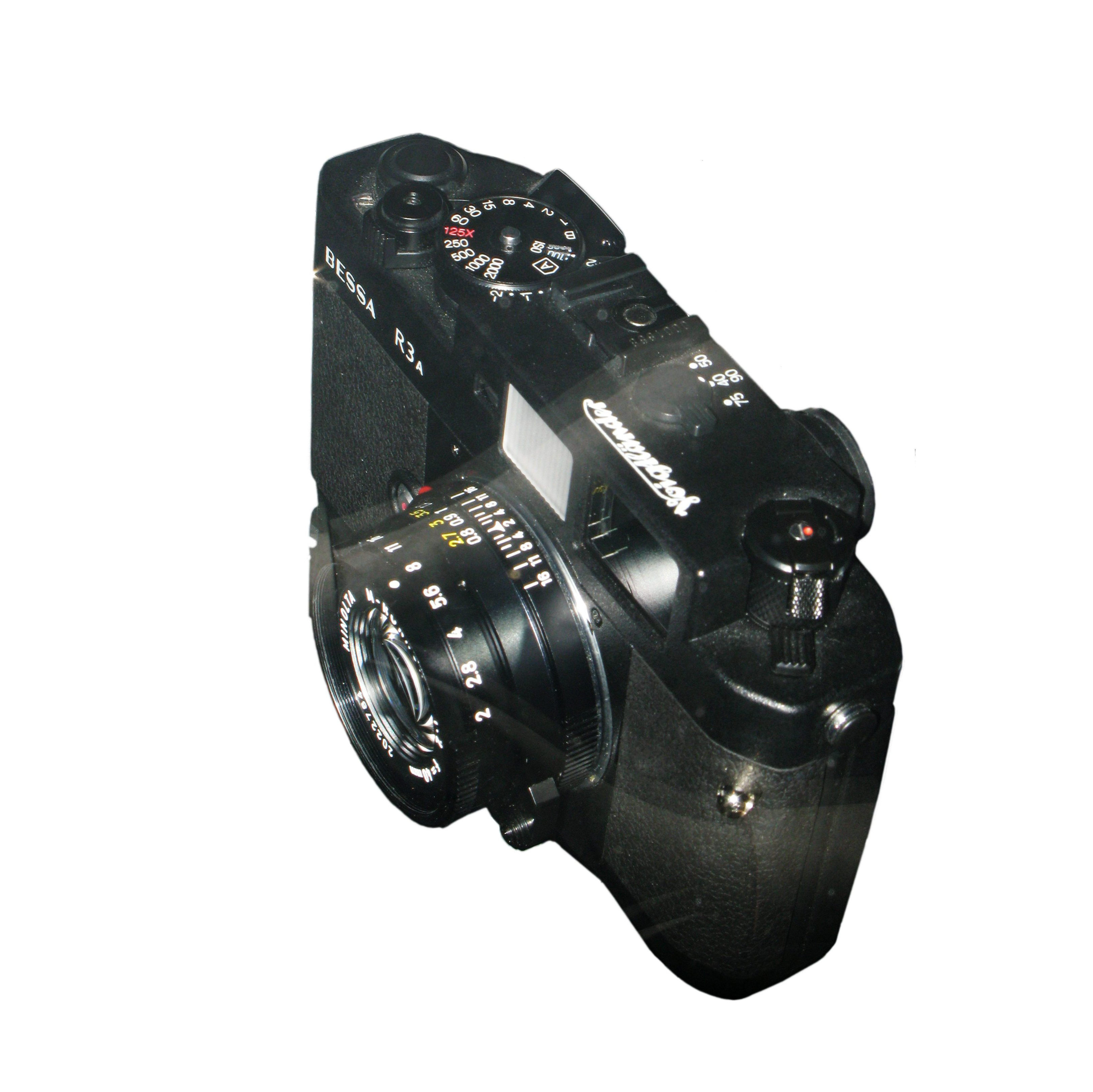
Voigtländer Bessa R3a

The Bessa family of cameras was manufactured in Japan by Cosina as a revival of the Voigtländer brand name between 1999 and 2015.

== Models ==
Every Cosina Voigtländer Bessa camera has a double focal-plane shutter with two sets of curtains to prevent damage by the sun. Shutter speeds range from 1 to 1/2000 s and bulb (B), with flash sync at 1/125 s on hot-shoe or PC terminal. They all have TTL exposure metering, and manual exposure controls; models with an "A" suffix (e.g., R2A, R3A, R4A) also have an aperture priority automatic mode.

Cosina Voigtländer Bessa cameras
Features Model	Image	Mount	RF	VF	Intro.	Disc.	Notes / Refs.
Bessa-L		M39	No	No	Feb 1999	May 2003	
Bessa-R		M39	Yes	Yes 0.7× (35, 50, 75, 90)	Mar 2000	Jul 2004	
Bessa-T		M	Yes	No	Apr 2001	Dec 2005	
Bessa-R2		M	Yes	Yes 0.7× (35, 50, 75, 90)	Apr 2002	Oct 2004	
Bessa-R2S/R2C		S / C	Yes	Yes 0.7× (35, 50, 85)	Nov 2002	Apr 2005	
Bessa-R2A		M	Yes	Yes 0.7× (35, 50, 75, 90)	Oct 2004	Jul 2007	Gray variant introduced July 2005, discontinued July 2007.
Bessa-R3A		M	Yes	Yes 1.0× (40, 50, 75, 90)	Oct 2004	Jun 2006	Gray variant introduced July 2005, discontinued July 2007.
Bessa-R2A (revised)		M	Yes	Yes 0.7× (35, 50, 75, 90)	Jan 2007	Jun 2013	Minor cosmetic differences for folding rewind lever.
Bessa-R2M		M	Yes	Yes 0.7× (35, 50, 75, 90)	Feb 2007	Sep 2015	
Bessa-R3A (revised)		M	Yes	Yes 1.0× (40, 50, 75, 90)	Jan 2007	Jun 2013	Minor cosmetic differences for folding rewind lever.
Bessa-R3M		M	Yes	Yes 1.0× (40, 50, 75, 90)	Feb 2007	Sep 2015	
Bessa-R4A		M	Yes	Yes 0.52× (21, 25, 28, 35, 50)	Mar 2007	Jun 2013	
Bessa-R4M		M	Yes	Yes 0.52× (21, 25, 28, 35, 50)	Mar 2007	Sep 2015	

=== Bessa-L and Bessa-T (finderless) ===
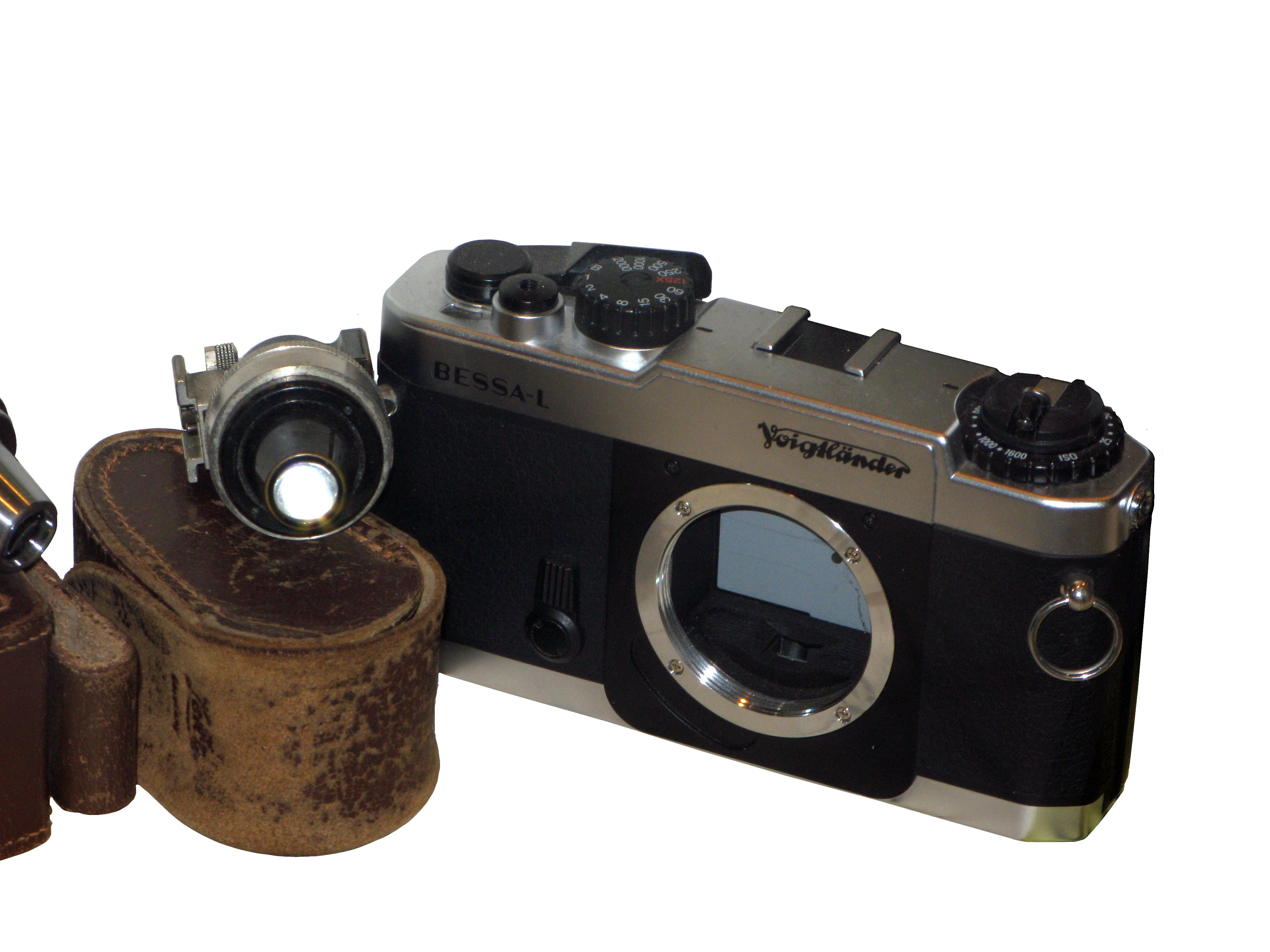
Bessa-L

The first model was the Bessa-L, introduced in 1999. This was a finderless body with a Leica screw mount, and operation and specifications similar to SLRs built by Cosina for other brands, such as the Nikon FM10, Olympus OM-2000, and Ricoh KR-5. It was introduced with a range of Voigtländer 39 mm screw lenses that were quite inexpensive and said to be of excellent quality. It could of course mount all the wide variety of 39 mm screw lenses by manufacturers as diverse as Leica, Canon, Nikon and even cheaper but often excellent Soviet lenses.

The Bessa-L was mostly intended to be used with ultra wide angle lenses, with which the absence of a focusing device is not a problem. Most notably Voigtländer introduced a 15 mm and a 12 mm lens, the latter being the widest rectilinear full-frame lens ever marketed up to then.

The Bessa-L has TTL metering with LED readout on the back edge of the top plate with an ASA range of 25–1600 and an EV range 1 to 19 at ASA 100. The readout consists of two red arrows pointing to a green light in between to indicate over, under, or correct exposure.

For some markets, the Voigtländer Bessa-L was sold as the Cosina 107-SW.

The Bessa-L was supplemented in 2001 by the Bessa-T, which used the Leica M-mount, could receive a trigger advance design, and had an integrated rangefinder with high magnification, but no viewfinder. It was sold in silver or black; from 2002, also in gray or olive (at a higher price and perhaps only in Japan). It is now discontinued.

In 2001, the Bessa-T was sold in a special kit, called Heliar 101st Anniversary (in short "T101"), with a 50 mm f:3.5 collapsible Heliar lens, for the anniversary of the Voigtländer Heliar lens design. It existed in black, grey, olive and blue: five hundred numbered examples were produced for each color.

=== Bessa-R and Bessa R2 (manual rangefinder) ===
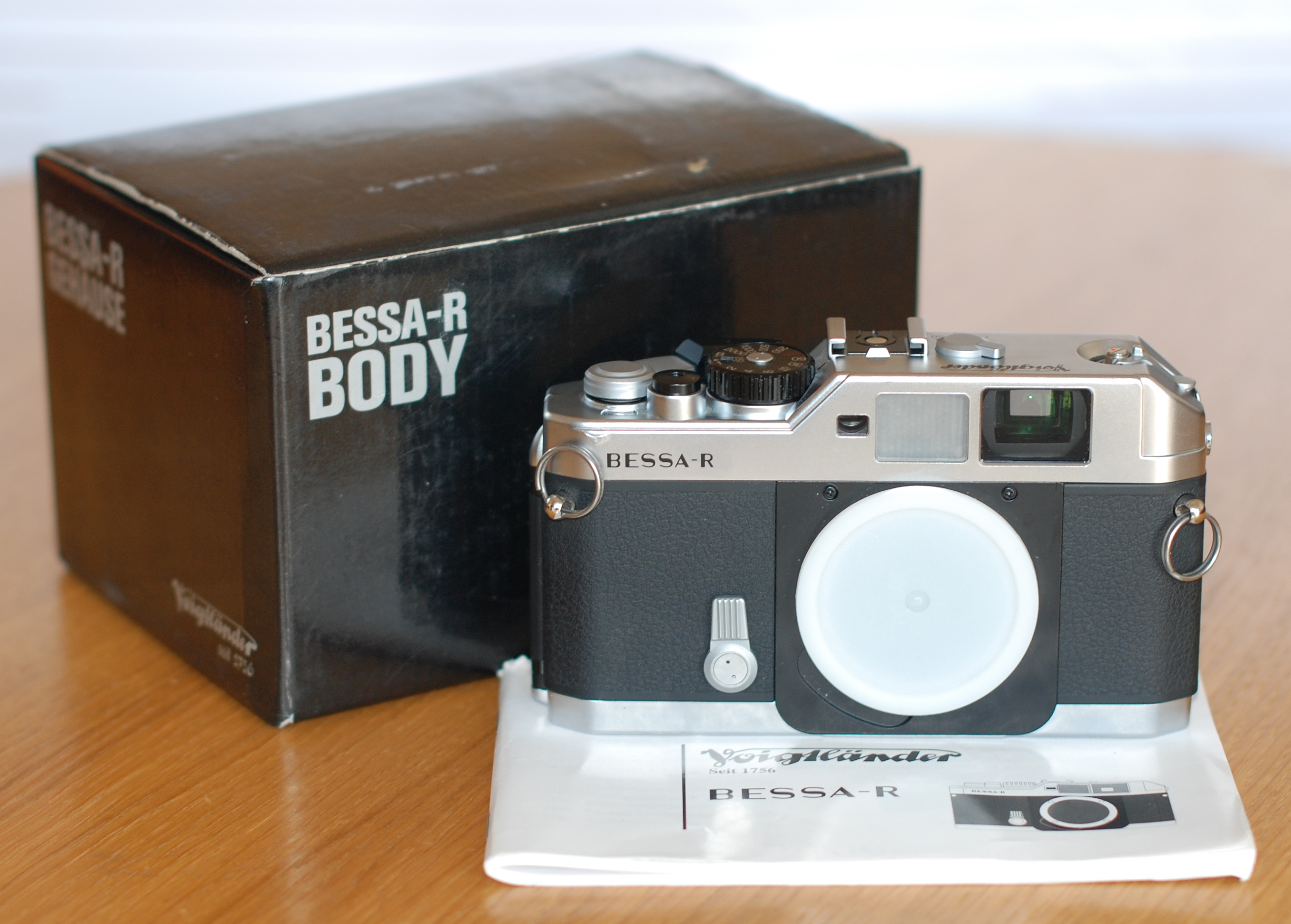
Bessa-R

The Bessa-R, introduced in 2000, was a rangefinder camera with a projected frame finder and a Leica screw mount. Although considerably cheaper than a Leica M camera, its viewfinder was comparable in function and feeling. It featured manually selectable frames for 35 mm/90 mm, 50 mm, and 75 mm lenses. The body, made of polycarbonate plastics, was not comparable to that of a Leica but was solid enough. All in all it was an inexpensive, all-manual rangefinder with TTL metering at a significantly lower price than a comparably equipped Leica M camera. It was available in black or silver; from 2002, also in navy blue or olive (at a higher price and perhaps only in Japan).

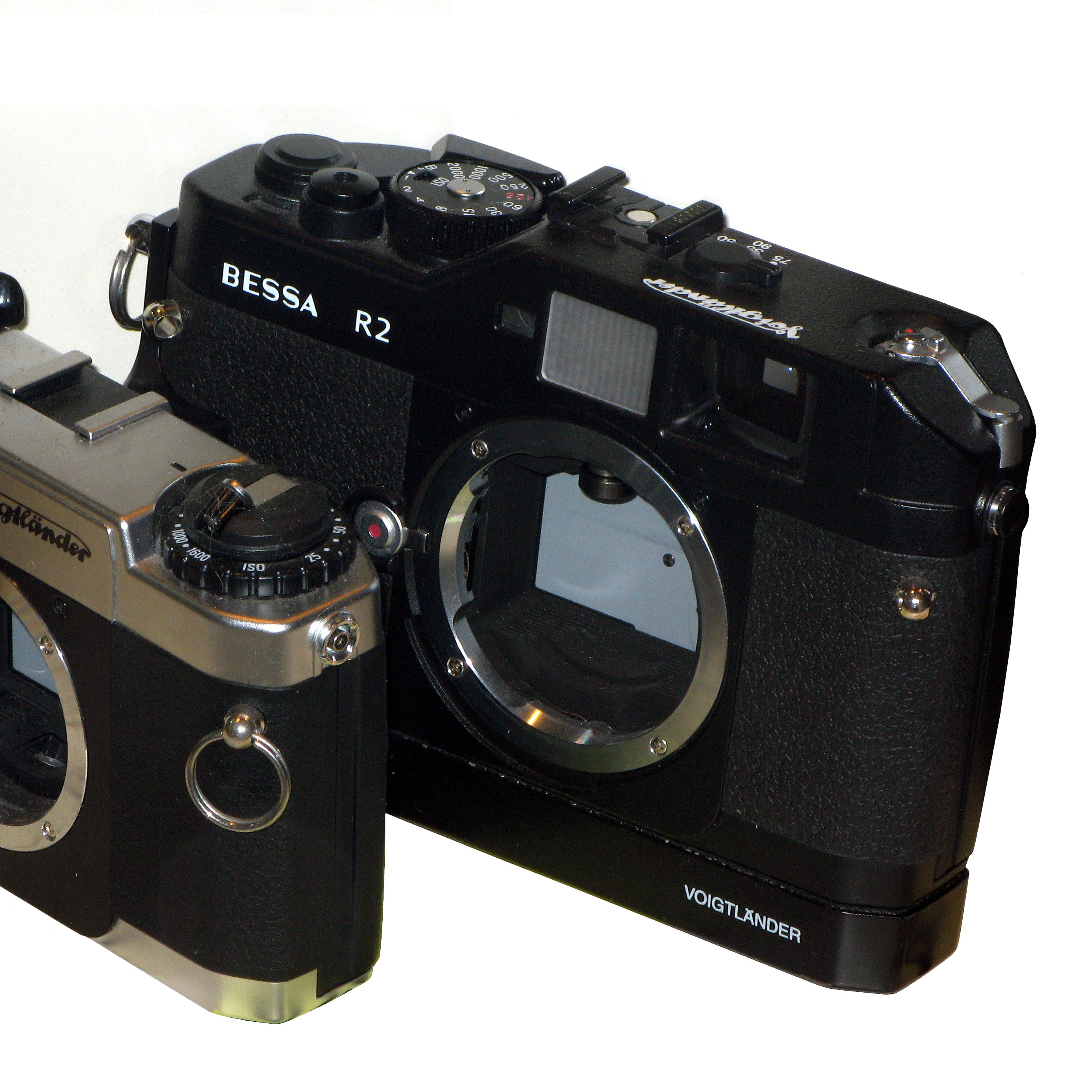
Bessa R2

The Bessa R2 replaced the Bessa-R in 2002. It was an updated version, with a Leica M-mount replacing the Leica screw mount, and the ability to take the same trigger advance accessory as the Bessa-T. Its quality of fabrication and overall finish was much better than the R, with magnesium alloy replacing the former model's plastic plates and a more substantial cast (as opposed to pressed) metal film rewind lever. The changes resulted in a more solid and marginally larger camera, available in either olive (with chrome detailing) or splatter-textured black paint finishes. The Bessa-R's self-timer was deleted from the R2, possibly due to the packaging constraints imposed on the design by the adoption of thicker metal panels.

==== Rollei 35 RF ====
The names Cosina, Voigtländer, and Bessa do not appear on the Rollei 35 RF (2002), which was marketed by Rollei Fototechnic rather than Cosina. Nevertheless, the camera is clearly based on the Bessa R2. Notable differences include a significantly higher price and a more conspicuous appearance. More importantly, the framelines are designed for 40 mm, 50 mm, and 80 mm lenses. The Rollei 35 RF is often regarded as the most suitable Bessa-derived camera for eyeglass wearers who primarily use a 40 mm lens.

==== Bessa-R2S and Bessa-R2C (Nikon and Contax mount) ====
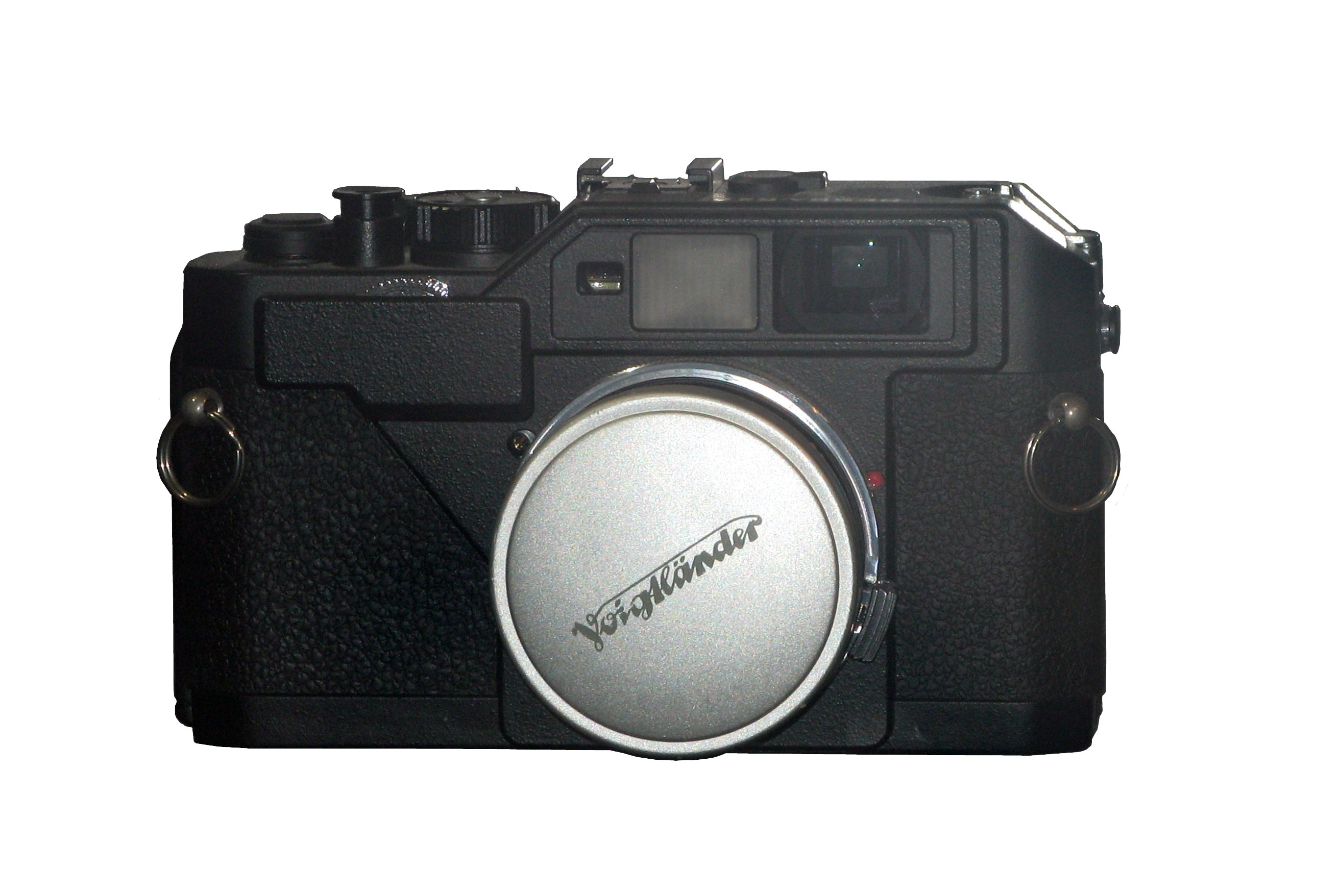
Bessa-R2C

The Bessa-R2S and Bessa-R2C are special versions of the Bessa R2, introduced in 2002, the Bessa-R2S having a Nikon rangefinder mount and the Bessa-R2C a Contax rangefinder mount.

In 2005, shortly before discontinuation of these two models was announced, the Bessa-R2S was also available in a "Nikon Historical Society" (NHS) version with special paintwork and a rigid version of the Heliar f/3.5 50 mm lens sold earlier with the Bessa-T. The set was available to the general public through regular retail channels in the US: Society membership was not required.

=== Bessa R2A and R3A (auto-exposure rangefinder) ===
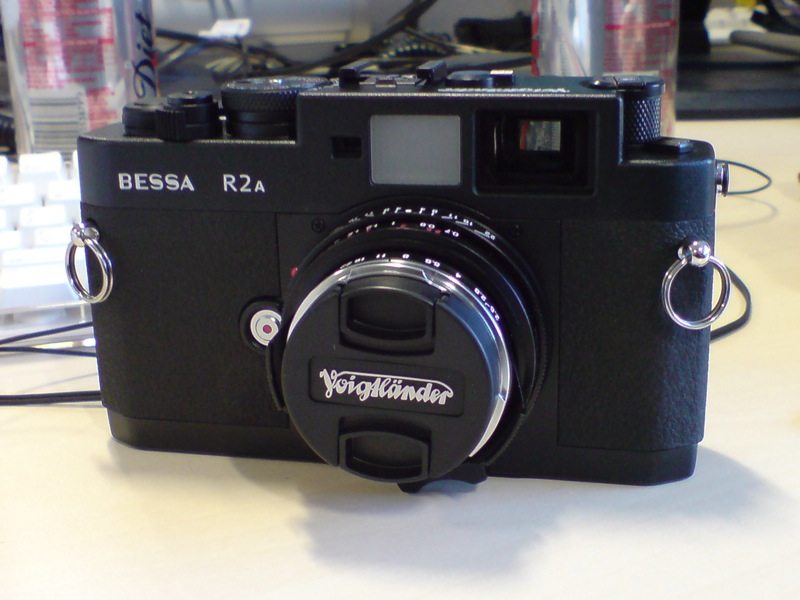
Bessa R2A

The Bessa R2A and Bessa R3A were introduced in 2004 and discontinued in 2013. They were updated versions of the Bessa R2, with the Leica M-mount and an aperture-priority automatic exposure, switchable to manual. The R2A has a finder with a 0.7x magnification, and 35/50/75/90 frame lines. The R3A has a finder with a 1x magnification, and 40/50/75/90 frame lines. Both can take the trigger advance accessory.

They were sold in textured black or flat grey paint finishes.

These cameras feature an electronic shutter, making the camera inoperable without batteries.

==== Epson R-D1 ====
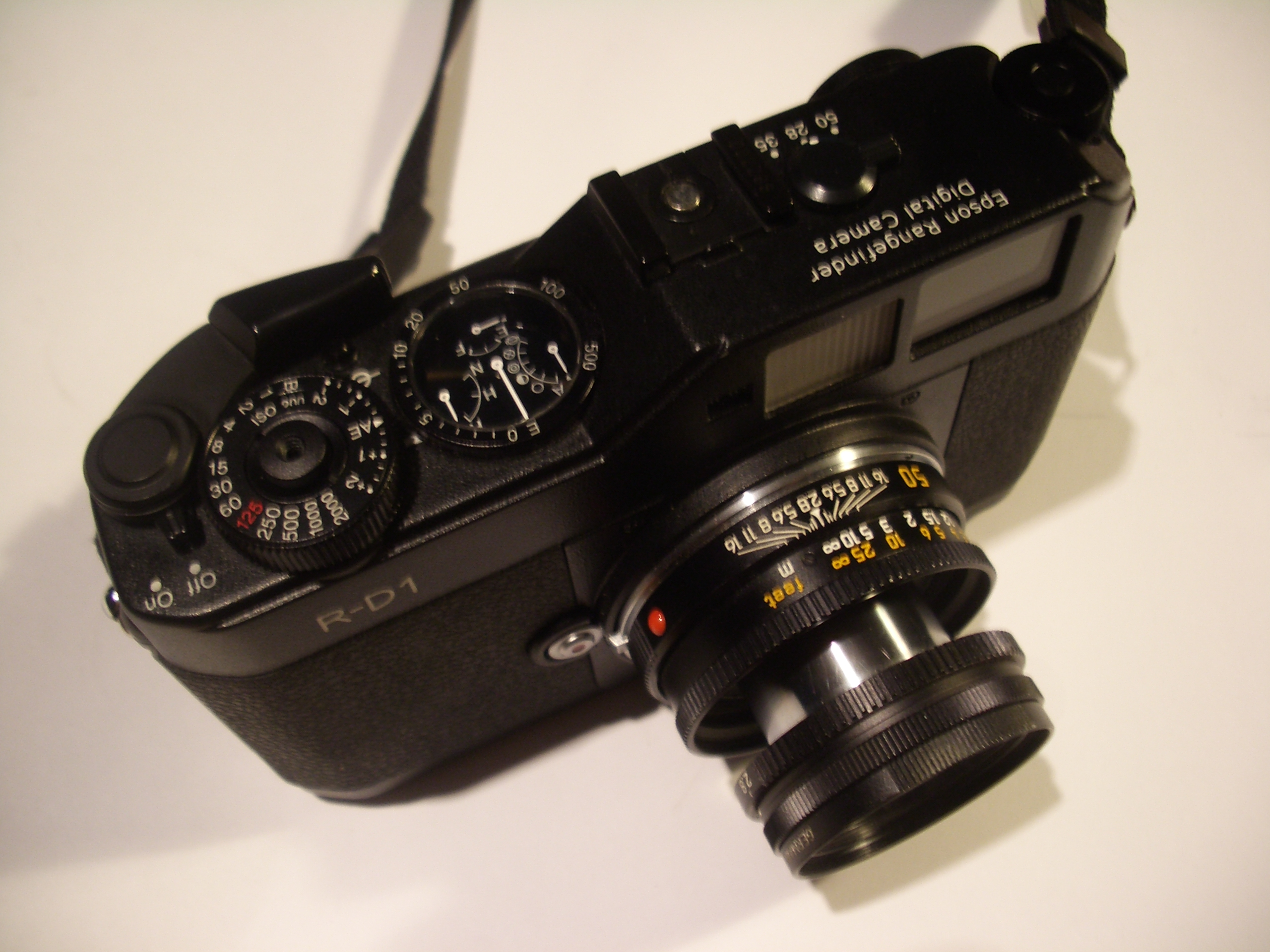
Epson R-D1

The Epson R-D1 was first shown in March 2004 as a prototype interchangeable-lens rangefinder digital camera developed in partnership between Epson and Cosina. It uses an APS-C sensor with 6 megapixel (3008×2000) resolution. Although the appearance is similar to the earlier Bessa-R/R2, internal features are closer to the Bessa-R2A, including an aperture-priority autoexposure mode.

==== Zeiss Ikon ====
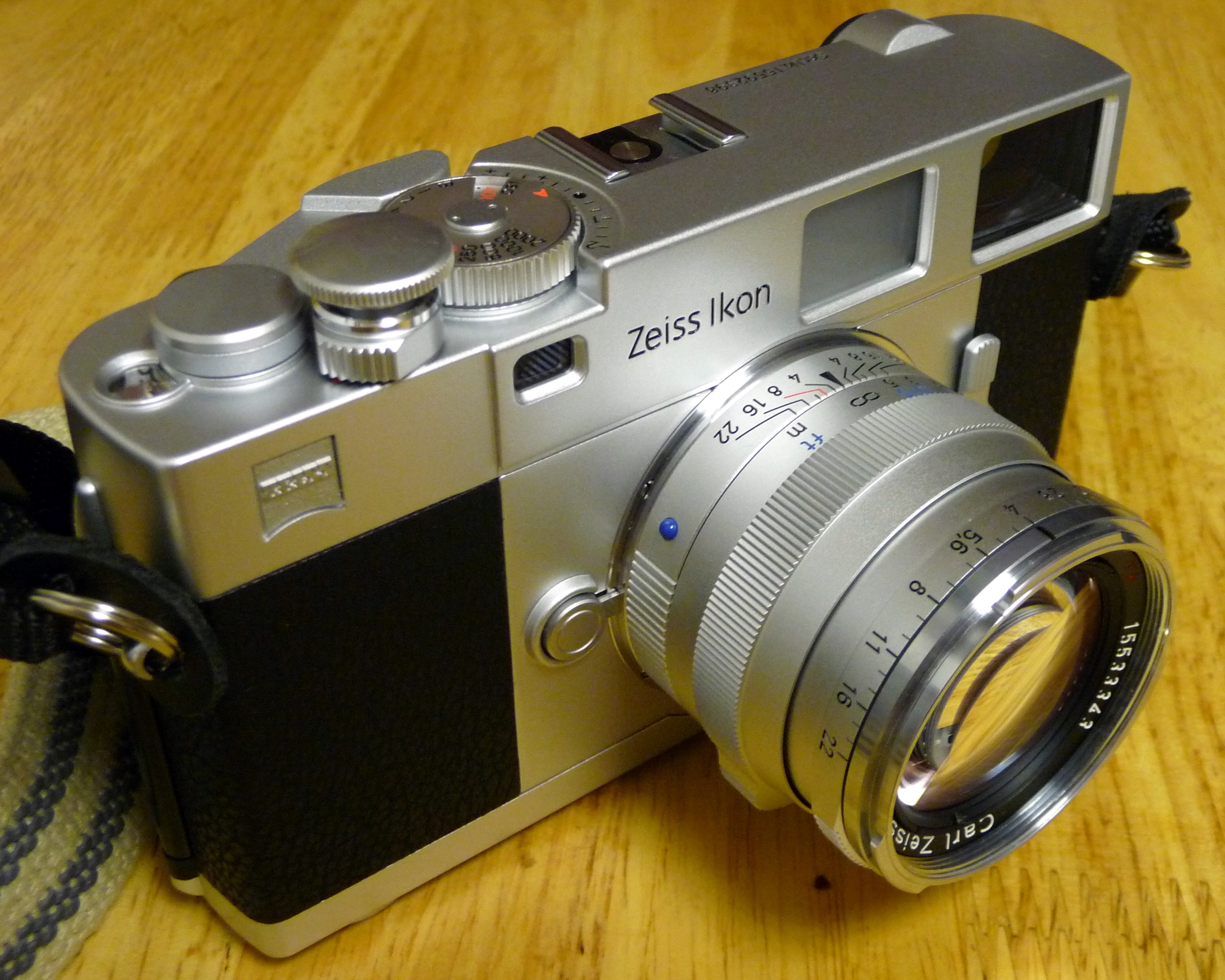
Zeiss Ikon ZM with Planar 50 mm f/2 lens

The Zeiss Ikon ZM (2004) and SW (2006) were introduced under the Zeiss Ikon branding, with features similar to the Bessa-R3A, including an autoexposure mode and Leica M mount compatibility, and a longer rangefinder base length. The ZM finder has 0.74× magnification and frame lines for 28, 35, 50, and 85 mm lenses. The SW omits the rangefinder and viewfinder assembly altogether and is intended for use with ultra wide angle lenses, which take advantage of extended depth of field to enable scale focusing at a hyperfocal setting. Both cameras were discontinued after December 2012.

==== Bessa R2M and R3M (manual rangefinder) ====
The Bessa R2M and Bessa R3M, both announced in Germany around March 2006 and in May elsewhere, are the updated manual-exposure, mechanical-shutter equivalents of the R2A and R3A.

A special 250th Anniversary Set, sold with a 50 mm f/2 M-mount collapsible Heliar lens, was also announced. They were sold in black (1000 examples of the R3M, 500 of the R2M) or silver (700 of the R3M, 300 of the R2M).

The Bessa R3m has a 1x viewfinder and 40/50/75/90 framelines. The internal meter requires batteries to operate but since the camera is mechanical it can still take pictures with no batteries.

==== Bessa R4M and R4A (wide-angle rangefinder) ====
Announced in October, 2006 at photokina, the Bessa R4M and Bessa R4A were the first Leica M-mount cameras to include framelines wider than 28 mm. The R4-series keeps the same features as the R3-series, but utilizes a wide-angle-specific viewfinder with .52x magnification and framelines for 21, 25, 28, 35, and 50 mm lenses. Like the previous limited edition R-series cameras, the R4A features aperture-priority autoexposure, while the R4M features full manual operation, including a mechanical shutter that will continue to work even if the battery (which powers the meter) is dead.

The R4M is available in the classic black of the R2 and R3-series, while the R4A is available in matte black.

== Notes ==
Type	1950s										1960s										1970s										1980s										1990s										2000s										2010s										2020s									
Type	50	51	52	53	54	55	56	57	58	59	60	61	62	63	64	65	66	67	68	69	70	71	72	73	74	75	76	77	78	79	80	81	82	83	84	85	86	87	88	89	90	91	92	93	94	95	96	97	98	99	00	01	02	03	04	05	06	07	08	09	10	11	12	13	14	15	16	17	18	19	20	21	22	23	24	25	26	27	28	29
Leica					M3																																																																											
Leica								M2																																																																								
Leica																	M4							M4		M4-2				M4-P			M6															M6 TTL						MP																										
Leica																						M5																															M7																				M6							
Leica										M1														Leica CL																																									M-A (127)															
Non-Leica	Konica Hexar RF • 35mm Bessa • Cosina Voigtländer • Minolta CLE • Rollei 35 RF • Zeiss Ikon																																																																															
