= RC algorithm =

The RC algorithms are a set of symmetric-key encryption algorithms invented by Ron Rivest. The "RC" may stand for either Rivest's cipher or, more informally, Ron's code. Despite the similarity in their names, the algorithms are for the most part unrelated. There have been six RC algorithms so far:

- RC1 was never published.
- RC2 was a 64-bit block cipher developed in 1987.
- RC3 was broken before ever being used.
- RC4 is a stream cipher.
- RC5 is a 32/64/128-bit block cipher developed in 1994.
- RC6, a 128-bit block cipher based heavily on RC5, was an AES finalist developed in 1997.
