= Cosina Voigtländer =

Photographic products manufactured by Cosina

Cosina Voigtländer (often abbreviated CV) refers to photographic products manufactured by Cosina under the Voigtländer name since 1999. Cosina leases rights to the Voigtländer name from RINGFOTO GmbH & Co. ALFO Marketing KG in Germany. Cosina Voigtländer products have included 35mm film SLR and rangefinder camera bodies, and lenses for the M39-mount (Leica thread mount LTM 39 × 1/26), M42-mount, Leica M-mount, and other lens mounts.

== Cameras ==
=== 35 mm Rangefinder ===
- Bessa L
- Bessa R
- Bessa T
- Bessa R2
- Bessa R2S
- Bessa R2C
- Bessa R2A
- Bessa R3A
- Bessa R2M
- Bessa R3M
- Bessa R4A
- Bessa R4M

=== Medium format rangefinder ===
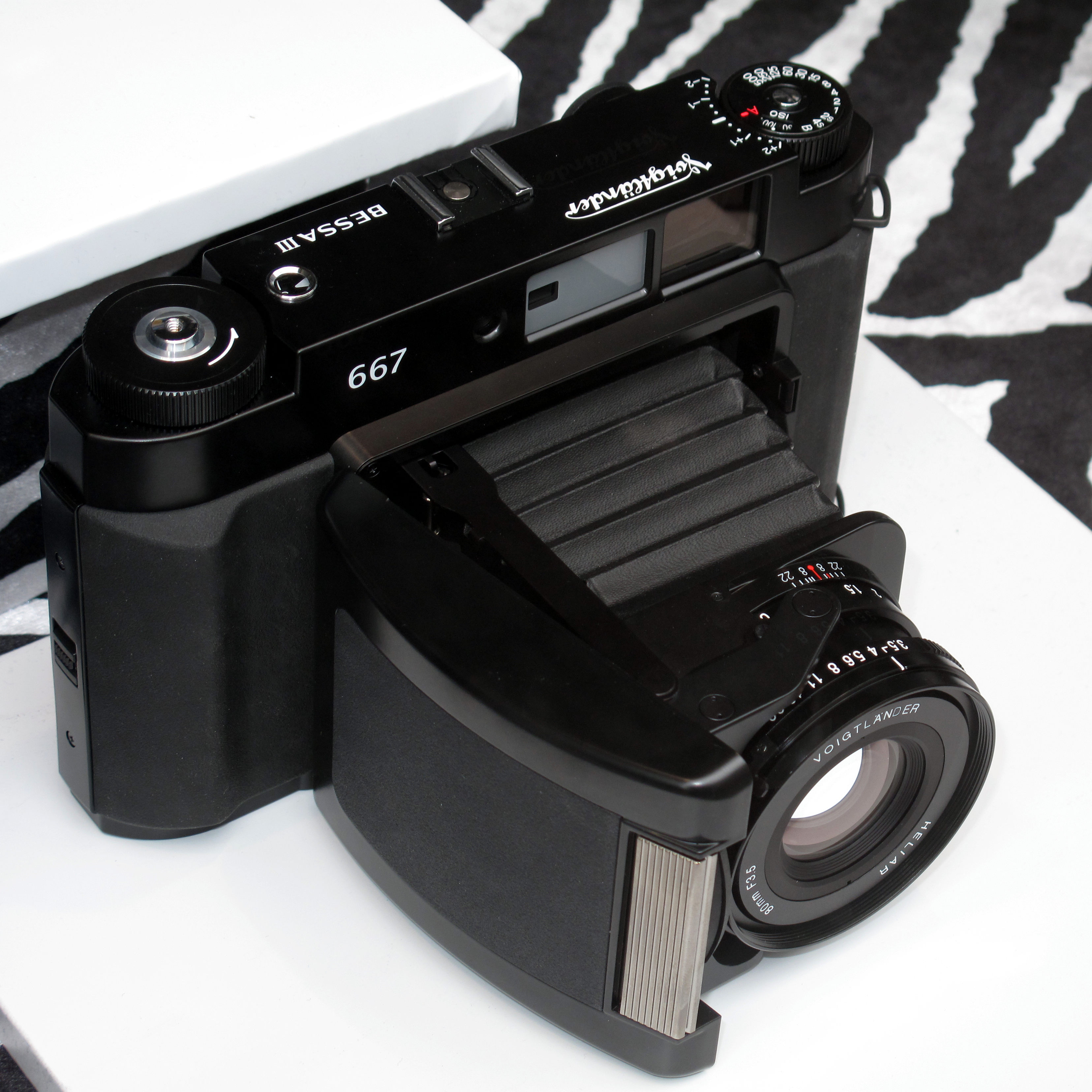
Bessa III 667, launched in 2009

- Bessa III

=== 35 mm SLR ===
- Bessaflex TM
- VSL 43

== Lenses ==
Cosina started producing cameras and lenses under the Voigtländer brand in 1999, when it introduced a new M39 body and lenses. It has since produced a prodigious variety of these lenses in M39, Leica M, Nikon S rangefinder (some fully usable with Contax RF bodies), and SLR mounts including M42 and Nikon F. Cosina produces hoods and accessory viewfinders for many of the lenses.

Note that while the manual focus lenses feature familiar Voigtländer names, the optical formulas are all new. Currently, Voigtländer lenses are available for seven different lens-mounts:

- Full-frame cameras (35 mm cameras)
  - Leica M-mount: VM series
  - Nikon F-mount: SL IIs series
  - Sony E-mount
  - Canon RF-mount
- Full-frame cameras and APS-C cameras
  - Nikon Z-mount
- APS-C cameras and Micro Four Thirds cameras
  - Fujifilm X-mount
  - Micro Four Thirds mount: MFT series.

Legacy lenses for the 35 mm cameras

- M39-mount (Leica thread mount LTM 39 × 1/26)
- Nikon S rangefinder mount
- M42-mount
- Canon EF-mount
- Canon FD-mount
- Contax/Yashica-mount (C/Y-mount)
- Minolta MC/MD-mount
- Olympus OM-mount and
- Pentax K-mount

have been discontinued.

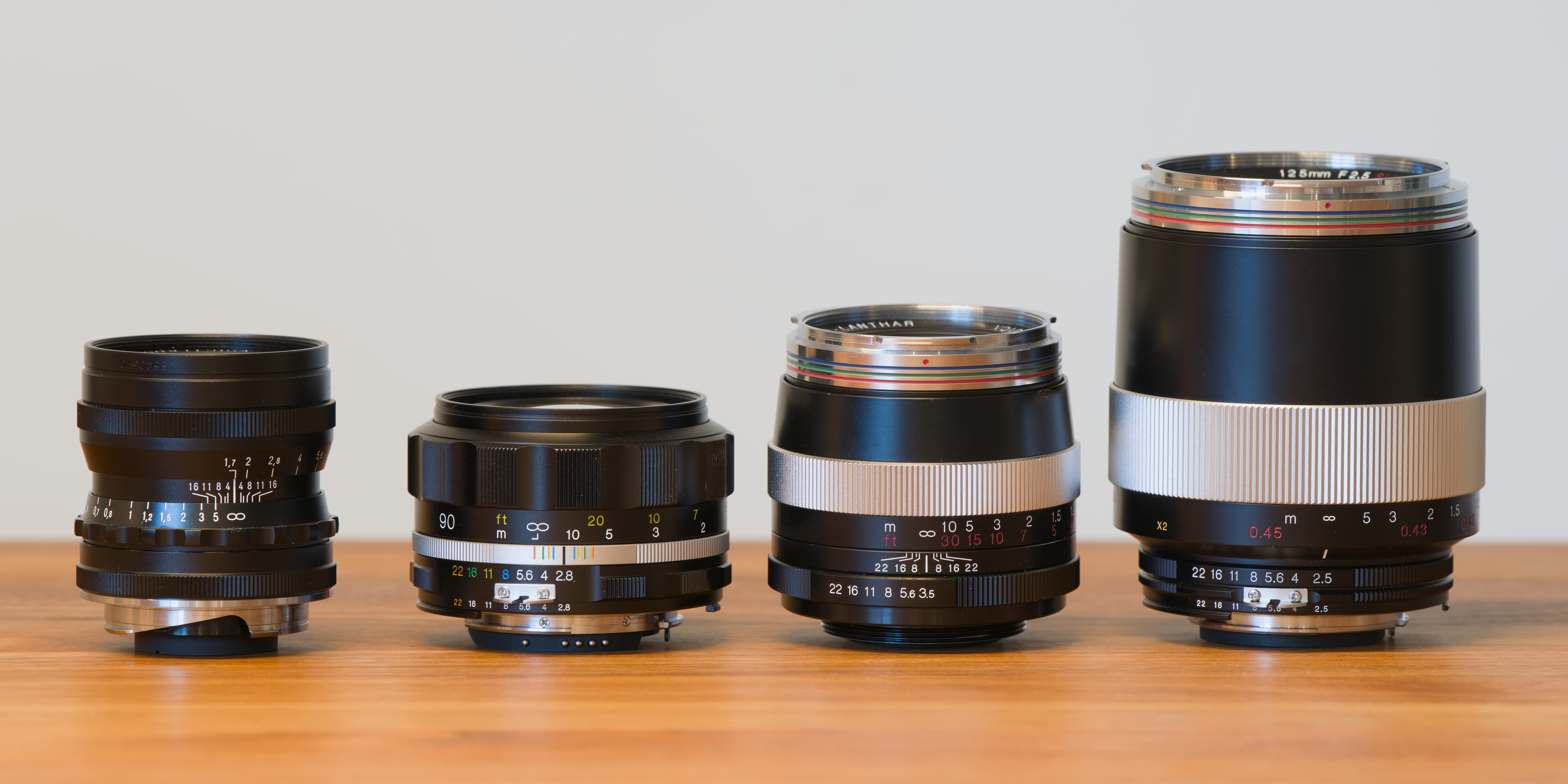
Left to right: Ultron 35 mm f/1.7 Aspherical (Leica M-mount), APO-Skopar 90 mm f/2.8 (Nikon F-mount), APO-Lanthar 90 mm f/3.5 SL (M42-mount), and Macro APO-Lanthar 125 mm f/2.5 SL (Nikon F-mount)

Most of the traditional Voigtländer lens brand names remain in use with Cosina, though the lens designs used by Cosina are generally different from the historical namesakes. However, Heliar lenses will still generally have slow apertures, Noktons are for fast apertures, APO-Lanthars will have above-average correction of chromatic aberrations and use many low-dispersion glass elements, while Skopars are compact and light lenses.

=== Leica M-mount: VM series ===
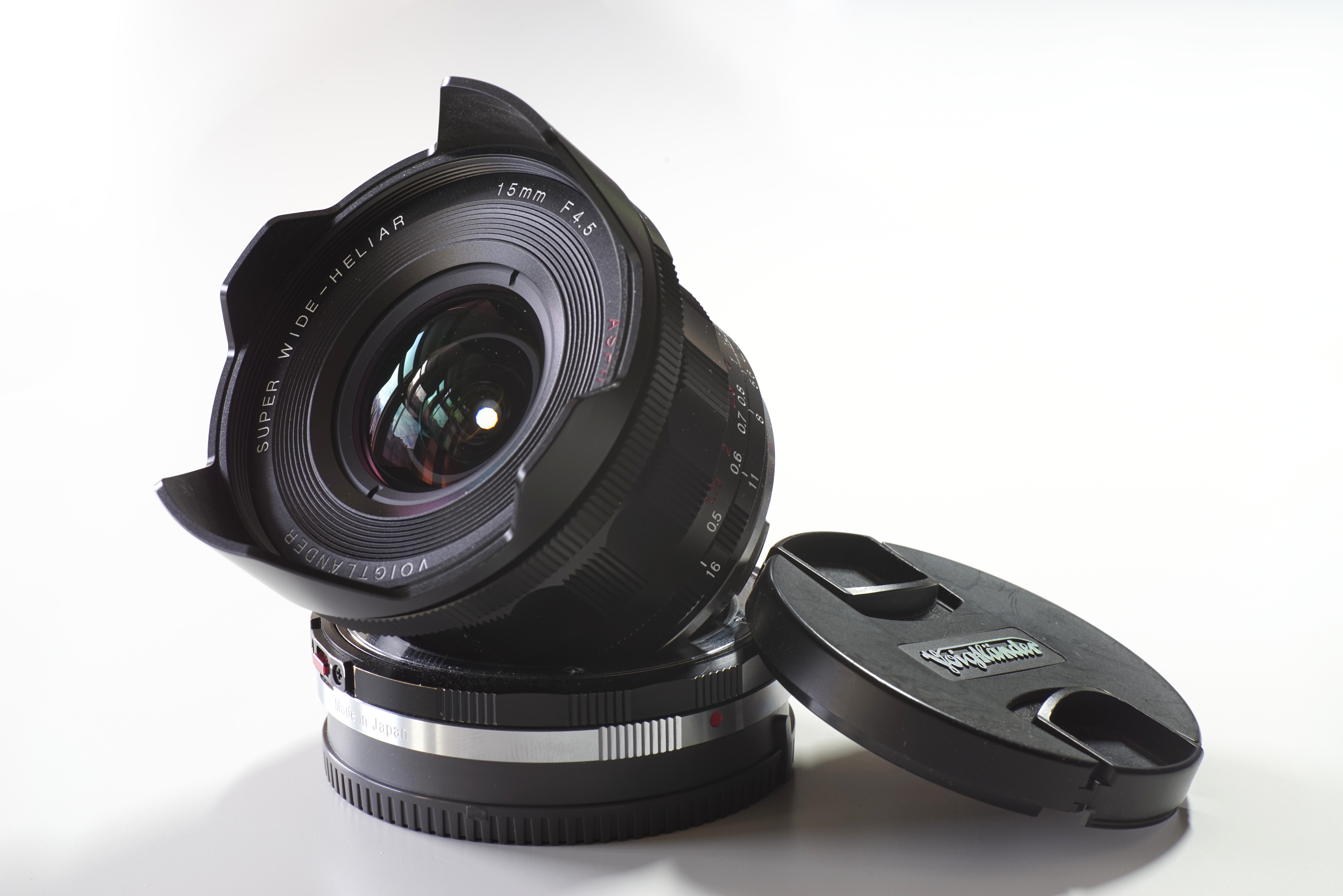
15mm f/4.5 Super Wide Heliar Asph. III on VM-E Close Focus adapter

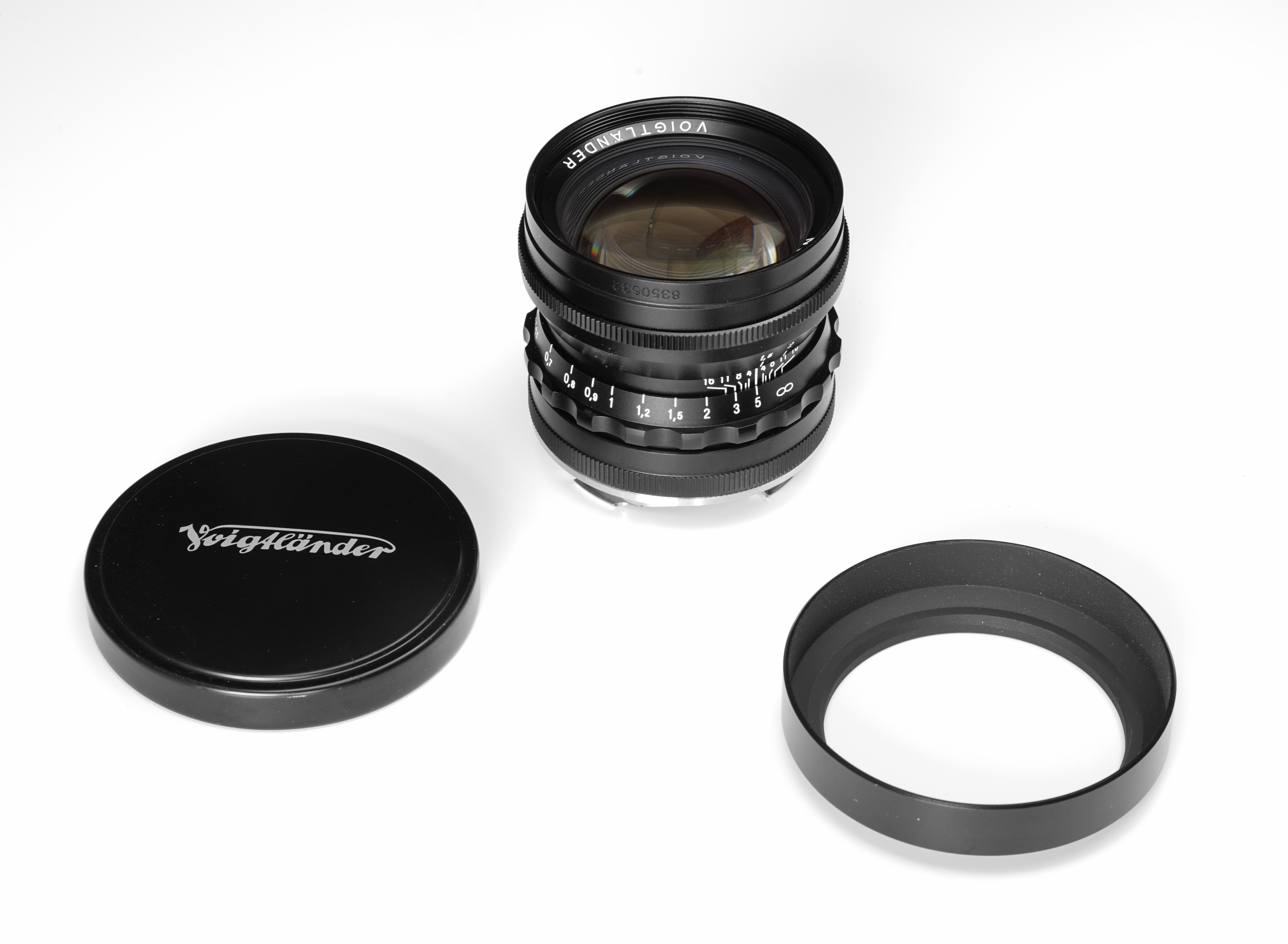
50mm f/1.5 Nokton

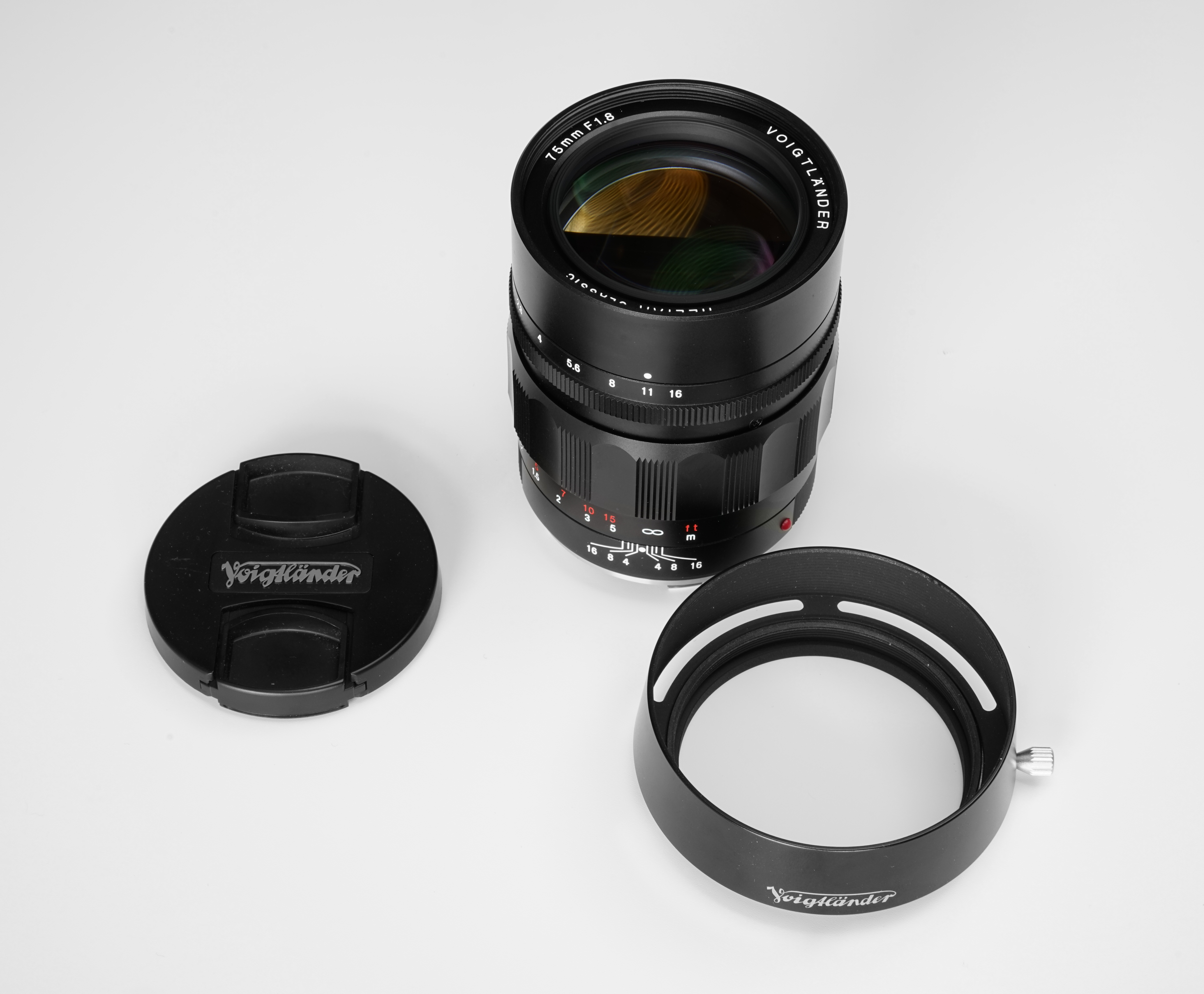
75mm f/1.8 Heliar Classic

At present (March 2025), there are 32 lenses for the Leica M-mount, which can all be combined with rangefinder except the 10 mm lens.

Cosina Voigtländer M-mount lenses: VM series
Focal length (mm)	F-number	Min. focus	Name	Lens const.	Aperture blades	Diameter × Length	Weight	Filter size
Ultra wide angle lenses
10	f/5.6	0.5 m (1.6 ft)	Heliar-Hyper Wide Asph.	13e/10g	10	67.8 mm × 58.7 mm (2.67 in × 2.31 in)	312 g (11.0 oz)	N/A
15	f/4.5	0.5 m (1.6 ft)	Super Wide-Heliar Asph. III	11e/9g	10	64.8 mm × 55.2 mm (2.55 in × 2.17 in)	247 g (8.7 oz)	φ58mm
21	f/1.4	0.5 m (1.6 ft)	Nokton Asph.	13e/11g	12	69.5 mm × 69.7 mm (2.74 in × 2.74 in)	480 g (17 oz)	φ62mm
21	f/3.5	0.5 m (1.6 ft)	Color-Skopar Vintage Line Asph.	9e/8g	10	52.0 mm × 30.0 mm (2.05 in × 1.18 in)	180 g (6.3 oz)	φ39mm
21	f/4	0.5 m (1.6 ft)	Color-Skopar P	8e/6g	10	55.0 mm × 25.4 mm (2.17 in × 1.00 in)	136 g (4.8 oz)	φ39mm
Wide angle lenses
28	f/1.5	0.5 m (1.6 ft)	Nokton Vintage Line Asph.	10e/8g	12	54.0 mm × 45.5 mm (2.13 in × 1.79 in)	250 g (8.8 oz)	φ43mm
28	f/2	0.5 m (1.6 ft)	Ultron Vintage Line Asph.	10e/7g	10	52.0 mm × 36.0 mm (2.05 in × 1.42 in); 51.4 mm × 36.0 mm (2.02 in × 1.42 in)	190 g (6.7 oz)	φ39mm
28	f/2.8	0.5 m (1.6 ft)	Color-Skopar Asph. (Type II)	8e/5g	10	51.0 mm × 23.5 mm (2.01 in × 0.93 in)	106 g (3.7 oz)	φ39mm
28	f/2.8	0.7 m (2.3 ft)	Color-Skopar Asph. (Type I)	8e/5g	10	52.0 mm × 23.5 mm (2.05 in × 0.93 in)	143 g (5.0 oz)	φ34mm
35	f/1.2	0.5 m (1.6 ft)	Nokton Asph. III	9e/7g	12	60.8 mm × 50.5 mm (2.39 in × 1.99 in)	332 g (11.7 oz)	φ52mm
35	f/1.4	0.7 m (2.3 ft)	Nokton Classic II	8e/6g	10	55.0 mm × 28.5 mm (2.17 in × 1.12 in)	189 g (6.7 oz)	φ43mm
35	f/1.5	0.5 m (1.6 ft)	Nokton Vintage Line Asph.	9e/6g	12	53.0 mm × 36.0 mm (2.09 in × 1.42 in)	188 g (6.6 oz)	φ39mm
35	f/2	0.5 m (1.6 ft)	Apo-Lanthar Asph.	11e/9g	12	55.6 mm × 58.1 mm (2.19 in × 2.29 in)	304 g (10.7 oz)	φ49mm
35	f/2	0.58 m (1.9 ft)	Ultron Vintage Line Asph.	8e/5g	10	52.0 mm × 28.1 mm (2.05 in × 1.11 in)	170 g (6.0 oz)	φ39mm
35	f/2.5	0.7 m (2.3 ft)	Color-Skopar P II	7e/5g	10	55.0 mm × 23.0 mm (2.17 in × 0.91 in)	134 g (4.7 oz)	φ39mm
35	f/3.5	0.7 m (2.3 ft)	Color-Skopar Asph.	6e/4g	10	52.0 mm × 14.0 mm (2.05 in × 0.55 in)	99 g (3.5 oz)	φ34mm
Normal lenses
40	f/1.2	0.5 m (1.6 ft)	Nokton Asph.	8e/6g	10	60.8 mm × 43.3 mm (2.39 in × 1.70 in)	315 g (11.1 oz)	φ52mm
40	f/1.4	0.7 m (2.3 ft)	Nokton Classic	7e/6g	10	55.0 mm × 29.7 mm (2.17 in × 1.17 in)	175 g (6.2 oz)	φ43mm
40	f/2.8	0.7 m (2.3 ft)	Heliar Asph.	5e/3g	10	52.0 mm × 21.2 mm (2.05 in × 0.83 in)	131 g (4.6 oz)	φ34mm
50	f/1	0.9 m (3.0 ft)	Nokton Asph.	9e/7g	12	73.6 mm × 55.0 mm (2.90 in × 2.17 in)	484 g (17.1 oz)	φ62mm
50	f/1.2	0.7 m (2.3 ft)	Nokton Asph.	8e/6g	12	63.3 mm × 49.0 mm (2.49 in × 1.93 in)	347 g (12.2 oz)	φ52mm
50	f/1.5	0.5 m (1.6 ft)	Heliar Classic	6e/3g	10	56.8 mm × 41.9 mm (2.24 in × 1.65 in)	255 g (9.0 oz)	φ49mm
50	f/1.5	0.7 m (2.3 ft)	Nokton Vintage Line Asph. II	8e/7g	12	55.3 mm × 36.9 mm (2.18 in × 1.45 in)	198 g (7.0 oz)	φ43mm
50	f/2	0.7 m (2.3 ft)	Apo-Lanthar Asph.	10e/8g	12	55.6 mm × 53.0 mm (2.19 in × 2.09 in)	288 g (10.2 oz)	φ49mm
50	f/2.2	0.5 m (1.6 ft)	Color-Skopar	7e/6g	10	51.4 mm × 30.0 mm (2.02 in × 1.18 in)	135 g (4.8 oz)	φ39mm
50	f/3.5	0.45 m (1.5 ft)	Apo-Lanthar I	8e/6g	10	52.0 mm × 45.0 mm (2.05 in × 1.77 in)	245 g (8.6 oz)	φ34mm
50	f/3.5	0.35 m (1.1 ft)	Apo-Lanthar II	8e/6g	10	52.0 mm × 45.0 mm (2.05 in × 1.77 in)	250 g (8.8 oz)	φ39mm
50	f/3.5	0.45 m (1.5 ft)	Apo-Lanthar Limited	8e/6g	10	52.0 mm × 45.0 mm (2.05 in × 1.77 in)	235 g (8.3 oz)	φ34mm
Telephoto lenses
75	f/1.5	0.7 m (2.3 ft)	Nokton Vintage Line Asph.	7e/6g	12	62.8 mm × 63.3 mm (2.47 in × 2.49 in)	350 g (12 oz)	φ58mm
75	f/1.9	0.5 m (1.6 ft)	Ultron	7e/5g	12	56.8 mm × 54.1 mm (2.24 in × 2.13 in)	290 g (10 oz)	φ49mm
90	f/2	0.9 m (3.0 ft)	Apo-Ultron	8e/7g	12	61.9 mm × 63.3 mm (2.44 in × 2.49 in)	340 g (12 oz)	φ52mm
90	f/2.8	0.9 m (3.0 ft)	Apo-Skopar	7e/7g	10	53.0 mm × 60.0 mm (2.09 in × 2.36 in)	250 g (8.8 oz)	φ39mm

=== Nikon F SLR-mount: SL IIs series ===
Voigtländer SL II lenses are CPU-enabled manual-focus designs available in Nikon AI-P (AI-S with Program). The Nikon term for such a design is AI-P, although these lenses are not designated as such. The CPU of SL IIs lenses enables full compatibility (except for autofocus) with the full range of AF Nikon SLR cameras similar to the AI-P manual-focus lenses Nikon has produced in the past. All metering patterns in 2-D mode, all program modes, and viewfinder focus indicators are available.

Cosina Voigtländer F-mount lenses: SL IIs series
Focal length (mm)	F-number	Min. focus	Name	Lens const.	Aperture blades	Diameter × Length	Weight	Filter size
Wide angle lenses
28	f/2.8	0.15 m (0.49 ft)	Color-Skopar Asph. SL IIs	7e/6g	9	66.3 mm × 32.8 mm (2.61 in × 1.29 in)	205 g (7.2 oz)	φ52mm
Normal lenses
40	f/2	0.25 m (0.82 ft)	Ultron Asph. SL IIs	6e/5g	9	66.3 mm × 37.5 mm (2.61 in × 1.48 in)	260 g (9.2 oz)	φ52mm
55	f/1.2	0.45 m (1.5 ft)	Nokton SL IIs	7e/6g	9	69.0 mm × 48.1 mm (2.72 in × 1.89 in)	365 g (12.9 oz)	φ52mm
58	f/1.4	0.45 m (1.5 ft)	Nokton SL IIs	7e/6g	9	67.6 mm × 45.5 mm (2.66 in × 1.79 in)	320 g (11 oz)	φ52mm
Telephoto lenses
90	f/2.8	0.9 m (3.0 ft)	Apo-Skopar SL IIs	7e/7g	9	66.3 mm × 41.0 mm (2.61 in × 1.61 in)	260 g (9.2 oz)	φ52mm

=== Sony E-mount ===
Since October 2015, numerous Voigtländer lenses have been released for full frame Sony E-mount.

Cosina Voigtländer E-mount lenses
Focal length (mm)	F-number	Min. focus	Name	Lens const.	Aperture blades	Diameter × Length	Weight	Filter size
Ultra wide angle lenses
10	f/5.6	0.3 m (0.98 ft)	Heliar-Hyper Wide Asph.	13e/10g	10	67.4 mm × 68.5 mm (2.65 in × 2.70 in)	375 g (13.2 oz)	N/A
15	f/4.5	0.3 m (0.98 ft)	Super Wide-Heliar Asph. III	11e/9g	10	66.4 mm × 62.3 mm (2.61 in × 2.45 in)	298 g (10.5 oz)	φ58mm
21	f/1.4	0.25 m (0.82 ft)	Nokton Asph.	13e/11g	12	70.5 mm × 79.5 mm (2.78 in × 3.13 in)	560 g (20 oz)	φ62mm
Wide angle lenses
28	f/1.5	0.28 m (0.92 ft)	Nokton Asph.	10e/8g	12	62.6 mm × 55.0 mm (2.46 in × 2.17 in)	320 g (11 oz)	φ49mm
35	f/1.2	0.3 m (0.98 ft)	Nokton Asph.	9e/7g	12	68.1 mm × 60.2 mm (2.68 in × 2.37 in)	380 g (13 oz)	φ58mm
35	f/1.4	0.3 m (0.98 ft)	Nokton Classic	8e/6g	10	67.0 mm × 39.6 mm (2.64 in × 1.56 in)	262 g (9.2 oz)	φ58mm
35	f/2	0.35 m (1.1 ft)	Apo-Lanthar Asph.	11e/9g	12	62.6 mm × 67.3 mm (2.46 in × 2.65 in)	352 g (12.4 oz)	φ49mm
Normal lenses
40	f/1.2	0.35 m (1.1 ft)	Nokton Asph.	8e/6g	10	70.1 mm × 59.3 mm (2.76 in × 2.33 in)	420 g (15 oz)	φ58mm
50	f/1	0.45 m (1.5 ft)	Nokton Asph.	9e/7g	12	79.3 mm × 69.3 mm (3.12 in × 2.73 in)	590 g (21 oz)	φ67mm
50	f/1.2	0.45 m (1.5 ft)	Nokton Asph.	8e/6g	12	70.1 mm × 58.8 mm (2.76 in × 2.31 in)	434 g (15.3 oz)	φ58mm
50	f/2	0.45 m (1.5 ft)	Apo-Lanthar Asph.	10e/8g	12	62.6 mm × 61.3 mm (2.46 in × 2.41 in)	364 g (12.8 oz)	φ49mm
Telephoto lenses
65	f/2	0.31 m (1.0 ft)	Macro Apo-Lanthar Asph.	10e/8g	10	78.0 mm × 91.3 mm (3.07 in × 3.59 in)	625 g (22.0 oz)	φ67mm
75	f/1.5	0.55 m (1.8 ft)	Nokton Asph.	7e/6g	12	74.0 mm × 73.9 mm (2.91 in × 2.91 in)	515 g (18.2 oz)	φ62mm
110	f/2.5	0.35 m (1.1 ft)	Macro Apo-Lanthar	14e/12g	10	78.4 mm × 99.7 mm (3.09 in × 3.93 in)	771 g (27.2 oz)	φ58mm

=== Nikon Z-mount ===
Cosina offers the following lenses with Nikon Z-mount as of 2023. These lenses offer electronic coupling to the camera for recording Exif data, focus confirmation and IBIS activation.

Cosina Voigtländer Z-mount lenses
Focal length (mm)	F-number	Min. focus	Name	Lens const.	Aperture blades	Diameter × Length	Weight	Filter size
Ultra wide angle lenses
15	f/4.5	0.126 m (0.41 ft)	Super Wide-Heliar Asph.	11e/9g	10	67.6 mm × 67.0 mm (2.66 in × 2.64 in)	290 g (10 oz)	φ58mm
Wide angle lenses
28	f/1.5	0.28 m (0.92 ft)	Nokton Asph.	10e/8g	12	67.6 mm × 57.0 mm (2.66 in × 2.24 in)	360 g (13 oz)	φ52mm
23 (full frame equivalent: 35)	f/1.2	0.18 m (0.59 ft)	Nokton Asph.	10e/6g	12	65.8 mm × 45.2 mm (2.59 in × 1.78 in)	240 g (8.5 oz)	φ46mm
35	f/2	0.27 m (0.89 ft)	Apo-Lanthar Asph. II	11e/9g	12	68.8 mm × 70.4 mm (2.71 in × 2.77 in)	420 g (15 oz)	φ58mm
Normal lenses
40	f/1.2	0.3 m (0.98 ft)	Nokton Asph.	8e/6g	10	67.7 mm × 53.9 mm (2.67 in × 2.12 in)	351 g (12.4 oz)	φ58mm
50	f/1	0.45 m (1.5 ft)	Nokton Asph.	9e/7g	12	79.3 mm × 66.6 mm (3.12 in × 2.62 in)	598 g (21.1 oz)	φ62mm
35 (full frame equivalent: 50)	f/1.2	0.3 m (0.98 ft)	Nokton	8e/6g	12	65.8 mm × 41.0 mm (2.59 in × 1.61 in)	230 g (8.1 oz)	φ46mm
50	f/2	0.45 m (1.5 ft)	Apo-Lanthar Asph. II	10e/8g	12	68.8 mm × 64.3 mm (2.71 in × 2.53 in)	370 g (13 oz)	φ58mm
35 (full frame equivalent: 52.5)	f/2	0.163 m (0.53 ft)	Macro Apo-Ultron	9e/6g	10	67.6 mm × 56.7 mm (2.66 in × 2.23 in)	290 g (10 oz)	φ52mm
Telephoto lenses
65	f/2	0.31 m (1.0 ft)	Macro Apo-Lanthar Asph.	10e/8g	10	78.0 mm × 88.8 mm (3.07 in × 3.50 in)	618 g (21.8 oz)	φ67mm
75	f/1.5	0.5 m (1.6 ft)	Nokton Asph.	7e/6g	12	74.0 mm × 75.9 mm (2.91 in × 2.99 in)	530 g (19 oz)	φ62mm

=== Canon RF-mount ===
Cosina Voigtländer manufactures manual focus lenses for Canon RF lens mount.

Cosina Voigtländer RF-mount lenses
Focal length (mm)	F-number	Min. focus	Name	Lens const.	Aperture blades	Diameter × Length	Weight	Filter size
Normal lenses
40	f/1.2	0.3 m (0.98 ft)	Nokton Asph.	8e/6g	10	70.8 mm × 56.4 mm (2.79 in × 2.22 in)	400 g (14 oz)	φ58mm
50	f/1	0.45 m (1.5 ft)	Nokton Asph.	9e/7g	12	79.3 mm × 64.0 mm (3.12 in × 2.52 in)	650 g (23 oz)	φ67mm
Telephoto lenses
75	f/1.5	0.5 m (1.6 ft)	Nokton Asph.	7e/6g	12	74.0 mm × 71.9 mm (2.91 in × 2.83 in)	525 g (18.5 oz)	φ62mm

=== Fujifilm X-mount ===
Cosina Voigtländer manufactures manual focus lenses for Fujifilm X-mount.

Cosina Voigtländer X-mount lenses
Focal length (mm)	F-number	Min. focus	Name	Lens const.	Aperture blades	Diameter × Length	Weight	Filter size
Wide angle lenses
18 (full frame equivalent: 28)	f/2.8	0.17 m (0.56 ft)	Color-Skopar Asph.	7e/5g	10	59.3 mm × 23.5 mm (2.33 in × 0.93 in)	115 g (4.1 oz)	φ43mm
23 (full frame equivalent: 34.5)	f/1.2	0.18 m (0.59 ft)	Nokton Asph.	10e/6g	12	59.3 mm × 43.8 mm (2.33 in × 1.72 in)	214 g (7.5 oz)	φ46mm
Normal lenses
27 (full frame equivalent: 40)	f/2	0.25 m (0.82 ft)	Ultron	6e/4g	10	59.3 mm × 23.5 mm (2.33 in × 0.93 in)	120 g (4.2 oz)	φ43mm
35 (full frame equivalent: 52.5)	f/2	0.163 m (0.53 ft)	Macro Apo-Ultron	9e/6g	10	60.7 mm × 54.8 mm (2.39 in × 2.16 in)	265 g (9.3 oz)	φ49mm
35 (full frame equivalent: 53)	f/0.9	0.35 m (1.1 ft)	Nokton Asph.	10e/8g	12	72.7 mm × 64.9 mm (2.86 in × 2.56 in)	492 g (17.4 oz)	φ62mm
35 (full frame equivalent: 53)	f/1.2	0.3 m (0.98 ft)	Nokton	8e/6g	12	59.6 mm × 39.8 mm (2.35 in × 1.57 in)	196 g (6.9 oz)	φ46mm
Telephoto lenses
50 (full frame equivalent: 75)	f/1.2	0.39 m (1.3 ft)	Nokton	9e/8g	12	63.9 mm × 49.0 mm (2.52 in × 1.93 in)	290 g (10 oz)	φ58mm

=== Micro Four Thirds mount: MFT series ===
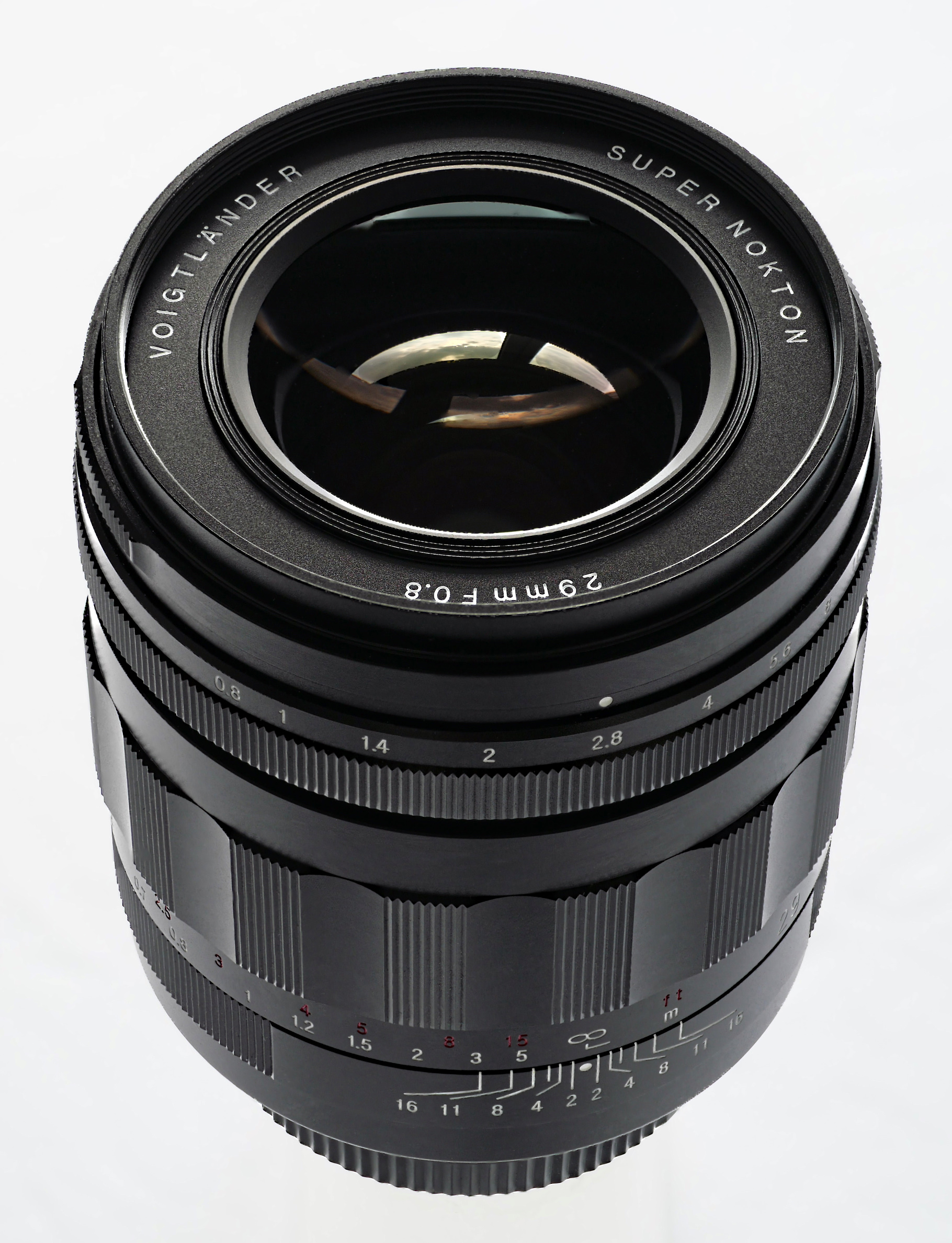
Super Nokton 29 mm F0,8 – the fastest lens available off-the-shelf in 2021

On August 26, 2010, Cosina joined the Micro Four Thirds Standard Group and have since introduced the following lenses:

Cosina Voigtländer Micro Four Thirds mount lenses: MFT series
Focal length (mm)	F-number	Min. focus	Name	Lens const.	Aperture blades	Diameter × Length	Weight	Filter size
Ultra wide angle lenses
10.5	f/0.95	0.17 m (0.56 ft)	Nokton Asph.	13e/10g	10	77.0 mm × 82.4 mm (3.03 in × 3.24 in)	585 g (20.6 oz)	φ72mm
Wide angle lenses
17.5	f/0.95	0.15 m (0.49 ft)	Nokton Asph.	13e/9g	10	63.4 mm × 80.0 mm (2.50 in × 3.15 in)	540 g (19 oz)	φ58mm
Normal lenses
25	f/0.95	0.17 m (0.56 ft)	Nokton Type II	11e/8g	10	60.6 mm × 70.0 mm (2.39 in × 2.76 in)	435 g (15.3 oz)	φ52mm
29	f/0.8	0.37 m (1.2 ft)	Super Nokton Asph.	11e/7g	12	72.3 mm × 88.9 mm (2.85 in × 3.50 in)	703 g (24.8 oz)	φ62mm
Telephoto lenses
42.5	f/0.95	0.23 m (0.75 ft)	Nokton	11e/8g	10	64.3 mm × 74.6 mm (2.53 in × 2.94 in)	571 g (20.1 oz)	φ58mm
60	f/0.95	0.34 m (1.1 ft)	Nokton	11e/8g	10	82.5 mm × 87.7 mm (3.25 in × 3.45 in)	860 g (30 oz)	φ77mm

== Discontinued lenses ==
Several lenses, which were manufactured in the past, have now been discontinued.

=== Leica M39-mount (Leica thread mount LTM 39 × 1/26): VM series ===
Discontinued Cosina Voigtländer M39-mount (Leica thread mount LTM 39 × 1/26) lenses: VM series
Focal length (mm)	F-number	Min. focus	Name	Lens const.	Aperture blades	Diameter × Length	Weight	Filter size	Black	Silver	Intro.	Disc.
Ultra wide angle lenses
12	f/5.6–22	0.3 m (0.98 ft)	Ultra Wide-Heliar Aspherical	10e/8g	9	50.5 mm × 38.2 mm (1.99 in × 1.50 in)	162 g (5.7 oz)	—	Yes	Yes	Sep 2000	Jan 2010
15	f/4.5–22	0.3 m (0.98 ft)	Super Wide-Heliar Aspherical	8e/6g	10	49.6 mm × 30.7 mm (1.95 in × 1.21 in)	105 g (3.7 oz)	—	Yes	Yes	Feb 1999	Dec 2012
21	f/4–22	0.5 m (1.6 ft)	Color-Skopar	8e/6g	10	49.6 mm × 29.1 mm (1.95 in × 1.15 in)	109 g (3.8 oz)	39 mm	Yes	Yes	Apr 2001	Oct 2012
Wide angle lenses
25	f/4–22	0.7 m (2.3 ft)	Snapshot-Skopar	7e/5g	10	49.5 mm × 29.5 mm (1.95 in × 1.16 in)	90 g (3.2 oz)	39 mm	Yes	Yes	Feb 1999	Dec 2005
28	f/1.9–22	0.7 m (2.3 ft)	Ultron Aspherical	9e/7g	10	55.8 mm × 63.1 mm (2.20 in × 2.48 in)	265 g (9.3 oz)	46 mm	Yes	Yes	Apr 2001	Jun 2007
28	f/3.5–22	0.7 m (2.3 ft)	Color-Skopar	7e/5g	10	49.6 mm × 25.8 mm (1.95 in × 1.02 in)	163 g (5.7 oz)	39 mm	Yes	Yes	May 2002	Apr 2007
35	f/1.7–16	0.9 m (3.0 ft)	Ultron Aspherical	8e/6g	10	55.0 mm × 47.7 mm (2.17 in × 1.88 in)	203 g (7.2 oz)	39 mm	Yes	Yes	Aug 1999	Apr 2007
35	f/2.5–22	0.7 m (2.3 ft)	Color-Skopar (C-type)	7e/5g	10	49.5 mm × 31.0 mm (1.95 in × 1.22 in)	116 g (4.1 oz)	39 mm	Yes	Yes	Mar 1999	May 2003
35	f/2.5–22	0.7 m (2.3 ft)	Color-Skopar (P-type)	7e/5g	10	55.0 mm × 25.0 mm (2.17 in × 0.98 in)	134 g (4.7 oz)	43 mm	Yes	No	Mar 1999	Apr 2009
Normal lenses
50	f/1.5–16	0.7 m (2.3 ft)	Nokton Aspherical	6e/5g	10	60.0 mm × 54.5 mm (2.36 in × 2.15 in)	243 g (8.6 oz)	52 mm	Yes	Yes	Oct 1999	Mar 2009
50	f/2.5–22	0.75 m (2.5 ft)	Color-Skopar	7e/6g	10	49.6 mm × 33.6 mm (1.95 in × 1.32 in)	208 g (7.3 oz)	39 mm	Yes	Yes	Apr 2002	Jun 2007
Telephoto lenses
75	f/2.5–16	1.0 m (3.3 ft)	Color-Heliar	6e/5g	10	55.5 mm × 64.5 mm (2.19 in × 2.54 in)	230 g (8.1 oz)	43 mm	Yes	Yes	Sep 1999	Sep 2010
90	f/3.5–22	1.0 m (3.3 ft)	APO-Lanthar	6e/5g	10	51.0 mm × 90.0 mm (2.01 in × 3.54 in)	230 g (8.1 oz)	39 mm	Yes	Yes	Feb 2001	Mar 2008 (S); Sep 2011 (B)

=== Leica M-mount: VM series ===
Discontinued Cosina Voigtländer Leica M-mount lenses: VM series
Focal length (mm)	F-number	Min. focus	Name	Lens const.	Aperture blades	Diameter × Length	Weight	Filter size	Black	Silver	Intro.	Disc.
Ultra wide angle lenses
12	f/5.6–22	0.5 m (1.6 ft)	Ultra Wide-Heliar Aspherical II	10e/8g	9	74.6 mm × 42.5 mm (2.94 in × 1.67 in)	230 g (8.1 oz)	—	Yes	No	Apr 2010	May 2016
12	f/5.6–22	0.5 m (1.6 ft)	Ultra Wide-Heliar Aspherical III	12e/10g	10	64.8 mm × 58.4 mm (2.55 in × 2.30 in)	283 g (10.0 oz)	—	Yes	No	Nov 2016	Nov 2019
15	f/4.5–22	0.5 m (1.6 ft)	Super Wide-Heliar Aspherical II	8e/6g	10	59.4 mm × 38.2 mm (2.34 in × 1.50 in)	156 g (5.5 oz)	—	Yes	No	Apr 2009	Sep 2015
Wide angle lenses
25	f/4–22	0.5 m (1.6 ft)	Color-Skopar P	7e/5g	10	55.0 mm × 30.3 mm (2.17 in × 1.19 in)	144 g (5.1 oz)	39 mm	Yes	No	Apr 2007	Mar 2016
35	f/1.2–22	0.7 m (2.3 ft)	Nokton Aspherical	10e/7g	12	53.0 mm × 77.8 mm (2.09 in × 3.06 in)	490 g (17 oz)	52 mm	Yes	Yes (ltd)	Apr 2003; August 2007 (ltd)	Dec 2010
35	f/1.4–22	0.7 m (2.3 ft)	Nokton classic	8e/6g	10	55.0 mm × 28.5 mm (2.17 in × 1.12 in)	200 g (7.1 oz)	43 mm	Yes	No	Feb 2008	Mar 2019
35	f/1.7–16	0.5 m (1.6 ft)	Ultron Vintage Line	9e/7g	10	53.0 mm × 50.9 mm (2.09 in × 2.00 in)	330 g (12 oz)	46 mm	Yes	Yes	Aug 2015	Nov 2019
Normal lenses
50	f/1.1–16	1.0 m (3.3 ft)	Nokton	7e/6g	12	69.6 mm × 57.2 mm (2.74 in × 2.25 in)	428 g (15.1 oz)	58 mm	Yes	No	Jun 2009	Nov 2019
50	f/1.5–16	0.7 m (2.3 ft)	Nokton Vintage Line Aspherical	6e/5g	10	53.8 mm × 45.7 mm (2.12 in × 1.80 in)	293 g (10.3 oz)	49 mm	Yes	Yes	Jun 2013	Feb 2020
Telephoto lenses
75	f/1.8–16	0.9 m (3.0 ft)	Heliar classic	6e/3g	10	57.9 mm × 73.8 mm (2.28 in × 2.91 in)	427 g (15.1 oz)	52 mm	Yes	No	Sep 2010	Apr 2019

=== Various SLR-mounts: SL series ===
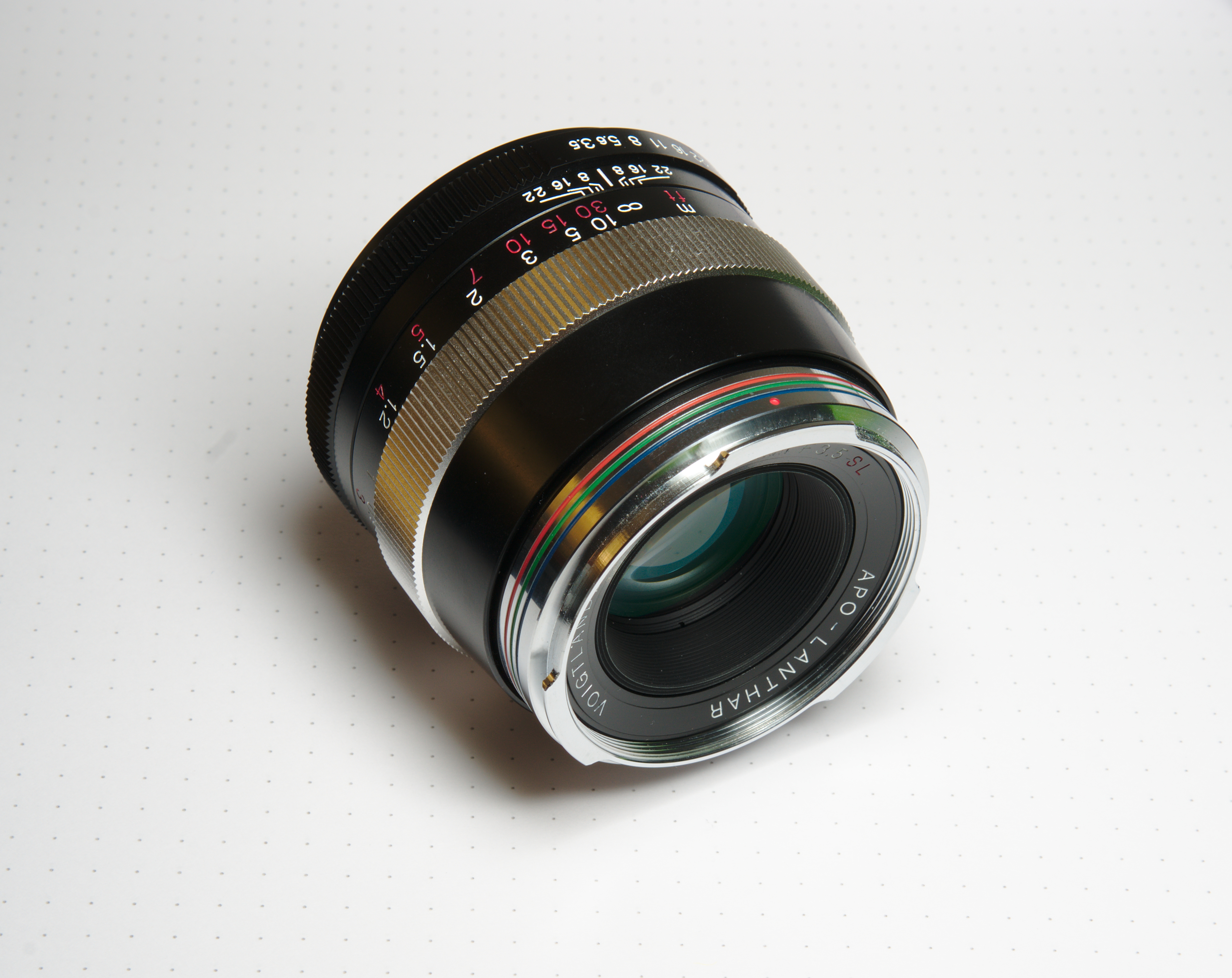
Cosina Voigtländer APO-Lanthar 90 mm f/3.5 SL Close Focus lens for M42-mount

Voigtländer SL lenses are manual-focus designs. They were sold in a variety of mounts: Nikon AI-S, Canon FD, Pentax K, M42, Minolta SR, Contax/Yashica MM, and Olympus OM. Some lenses were also available in Canon EF- and Minolta A-mount, although without autofocus. They were produced for a short time, and discontinued when Cosina introduced its Carl Zeiss "Z" series lenses.

Discontinued Cosina Voigtländer single-lens reflex camera lenses: SL series
Focal length (mm)	F-number	Min. focus	Name	Lens const.	Aperture blades	Diameter × Length	Weight	Filter size	Mounts	Intro.	Disc.
Ultra wide angle lenses
12	f/5.6–22	0.3 m (0.98 ft)	Ultra Wide-Heliar Aspherical	10e/8g	9	63.5 mm × 16.0 mm (2.50 in × 0.63 in)	200 g (7.1 oz)	—	NF (MLU)	Mar 2003	Mar 2007
15	f/4.5–22	0.3 m (0.98 ft)	Super Wide-Heliar Aspherical	8e/6g	10	63.5 mm × 12.8 mm (2.50 in × 0.50 in)	150 g (5.3 oz)	—	NF (MLU)	Mar 2003	Apr 2007
Normal lenses
40	f/2–16	0.4 m (1.3 ft)	Ultron Aspherical	6e/5g	9	63.5 mm × 29.5 mm (2.50 in × 1.16 in) (Ai-S)	255 g (9.0 oz)	52 mm	FD, Ai-S, MD, OM, PK-A/R, CY, M42	May 2002	Mar 2007
Telephoto lenses
75	f/2.5–16	0.7 m (2.3 ft)	Color-Heliar	6e/5g	9	63.5 mm × 40.2 mm (2.50 in × 1.58 in) (Ai-S)	250 g (8.8 oz)	49 mm	FD, Ai-S, MD, OM, PK-A/R, CY, M42	Jul 2000	Dec 2005
90	f/3.5–22	0.5 m (1.6 ft)	APO-Lanthar Close Focus	6e/5g	9	63.5 mm × 57.6 mm (2.50 in × 2.27 in) (Ai-S)	390 g (14 oz)	49 mm	FD, Ai-S, MD, OM, PK-A/R, CY, M42	Mar 2002	Apr 2007
125	f/2.5–22	0.38 m (1.2 ft)	Macro APO-Lanthar	11e/9g	9	76.0 mm × 88.2 mm (2.99 in × 3.47 in) (Ai-S)	690 g (24 oz)	58 mm	FD, Ai-S, MD, OM, PK-A/R, CY, M42, EF, α	Jun 2001	Mar 2007
180	f/4–22	1.2 m (3.9 ft)	APO-Lanthar Close Focus	9e/7g	9	65.6 mm × 79.0 mm (2.58 in × 3.11 in) (Ai-S)	485 g (17.1 oz)	49 mm	FD, Ai-S, MD, OM, PK-A/R, CY, M42	Aug 2003	Apr 2007

=== Nikon, Canon and Pentax SLR-mounts: SL II and SL II N series ===
Discontinued Cosina Voigtländer single-lens reflex camera lenses: SL II and SL II N series
Focal length (mm)	F-number	Min. focus	Name	Lens const.	Aperture blades	Diameter × Length	Weight	Filter size	Mounts	Intro.	Disc.
Ultra wide angle lenses
20	f/3.5–22	0.2 m (0.66 ft)	Color-Skopar Aspherical SL II	9e/6g	9	63.0 mm × 28.8 mm (2.48 in × 1.13 in)	202 g (7.1 oz)	52 mm	Ai-S (CPU)	Mar 2009	Feb 2012
20	f/3.5–22	0.2 m (0.66 ft)	Color-Skopar Aspherical SL II	9e/6g	9	—	—	52 mm	KA	Mar 2009	Sep 2010
20	f/3.5–22	0.2 m (0.66 ft)	Color-Skopar Aspherical SL II	9e/6g	9	70.0 mm × 31.2 mm (2.76 in × 1.23 in)	240 g (8.5 oz)	52 mm	EF	Dec 2009	Feb 2012
20	f/3.5–22	0.2 m (0.66 ft)	Color-Skopar Aspherical SL II N	9e/6g	9	63.6 mm × 28.8 mm (2.50 in × 1.13 in)	202 g (7.1 oz)	52 mm	Ai-S (CPU)	Sep 2012	Feb 2016
20	f/3.5–22	0.2 m (0.66 ft)	Color-Skopar Aspherical SL II N	9e/6g	9	70.0 mm × 31.2 mm (2.76 in × 1.23 in)	240 g (8.5 oz)	52 mm	EF	Sep 2012	Apr 2015
Wide angle lenses
28	f/2.8–22	0.22 m (0.72 ft)	Color-Skopar Aspherical SL II N	7e/6g	9	63.6 mm × 24.5 mm (2.50 in × 0.96 in)	180 g (6.3 oz)	52 mm	Ai-S (CPU)	Sep 2012	Feb 2016
28	f/2.8–22	0.22 m (0.72 ft)	Color-Skopar Aspherical SL II N	7e/6g	9	70.0 mm × 27.0 mm (2.76 in × 1.06 in)	230 g (8.1 oz)	52 mm	EF	Sep 2012	Apr 2015
Normal lenses
40	f/2–22	0.38 m (1.2 ft)	Ultron Aspherical SL II	6e/5g	9	63.0 mm × 24.5 mm (2.48 in × 0.96 in)	200 g (7.1 oz)	52 mm	Ai-S (CPU)	Nov 2007	Feb 2012
40	f/2–22	0.38 m (1.2 ft)	Ultron Aspherical SL II	6e/5g	9	—	—	52 mm	KA	Nov 2007	Sep 2010
40	f/2–22	0.38 m (1.2 ft)	Ultron Aspherical SL II	6e/5g	9	70.0 mm × 27.0 mm (2.76 in × 1.06 in)	—	52 mm	EF	Nov 2009	Feb 2012
40	f/2–22	0.38 m (1.2 ft)	Ultron Aspherical SL II N	6e/5g	9	63.6 mm × 24.5 mm (2.50 in × 0.96 in)	180 g (6.3 oz)	52 mm	Ai-S (CPU)	Jul 2012	Jun 2017
40	f/2–22	0.38 m (1.2 ft)	Ultron Aspherical SL II N	6e/5g	9	70.0 mm × 27.0 mm (2.76 in × 1.06 in)	230 g (8.1 oz)	52 mm	EF	Jul 2012	Apr 2015
58	f/1.4–16	0.45 m (1.5 ft)	Nokton SL II	7e/6g	9	64.4 mm × 47.5 mm (2.54 in × 1.87 in)	320 g (11 oz)	58 mm	Ai-S (CPU)	Dec 2007	Feb 2012
58	f/1.4–16	0.45 m (1.5 ft)	Nokton SL II	7e/6g	9	—	—	58 mm	KA	Dec 2007	Sep 2010
58	f/1.4–16	0.45 m (1.5 ft)	Nokton SL II N	7e/6g	9	65.9 mm × 47.5 mm (2.59 in × 1.87 in)	—	58 mm	Ai-S (CPU)	Aug 2012	Sep 2016
Telephoto lenses
90	f/3.5–22	0.5 m (1.6 ft)	APO-Lanthar SL II Close Focus	6e/5g	9	63.0 mm × 48.2 mm (2.48 in × 1.90 in)	320 g (11 oz)	52 mm	Ai-S (CPU)	May 2010	Feb 2012
90	f/3.5–22	0.5 m (1.6 ft)	APO-Lanthar SL II Close Focus	6e/5g	9	—	—	52 mm	KA	May 2010	Sep 2010
90	f/3.5–22	0.5 m (1.6 ft)	APO-Lanthar SL II Close Focus	6e/5g	9	—	—	52 mm	EF	May 2010	Feb 2012

=== Sony E-mount ===
Discontinued Cosina Voigtländer Sony E-mount lenses
Focal length (mm)	F-number	Min. focus	Name	Lens const.	Aperture blades	Diameter × Length	Weight	Filter size	Black	Silver	Intro.	Disc.
Ultra wide angle lenses
12	f/5.6–22	0.3 m (0.98 ft)	Ultra Wide-Heliar Aspherical III	12e/10g	10	67.4 mm × 68.3 mm (2.65 in × 2.69 in)	350 g (12 oz)	—	Yes	No	Sep 2016	Apr 2019

=== Micro Four Thirds mount: MFT series ===
Discontinued Cosina Voigtländer Micro Four Thirds mount lenses: MFT series
Focal length (mm)	F-number	Min. focus	Name	Lens const.	Aperture blades	Diameter × Length	Weight	Filter size	Black	Silver	Intro.	Disc.
Normal lenses
25	f/0.95–16	0.17 m (0.56 ft)	Nokton	11e/8g	10	58.4 mm × 70.0 mm (2.30 in × 2.76 in)	410 g (14 oz)	52 mm	Yes	No	Oct 2010	Jun 2016
