= RC =

RC, R/C, Rc, or rc may refer to:

== Science and technology ==
=== Computing ===
- rc, the default Command line interface in Version 10 Unix and Plan 9 from Bell Labs
- .rc (for "run commands"), a filename extension for configuration files in UNIX-like environments
- rc, a file extension and compiler for Microsoft Windows resource scripts
- Reconfigurable computing, a computer architecture
- Release Candidate, a term used in software engineering
- Return code, used to identify errors or other aspects of software behavior
- "Rivest's Cipher", a term used in cryptographic algorithms
- RoundCube, a web-based IMAP e-mail client
- RealityCapture, a photogrammetry software

=== Electronics ===
- RC circuit, resistance/capacitance circuit, a term used in electronics
- Radio control, a technology found in remote control vehicles
- Reflection coefficient of a circuit
- Remote control, a technology found in home entertainment devices

=== Other uses in science and technology ===
- SJ Rc, a Swedish locomotive
- Reinforced concrete, concrete incorporating reinforcement bars ("rebars")
- Research chemicals, chemical substances intended for research purposes and laboratory use
  - "Research chemicals", i.e. "grey" market psychoactive drugs
- Reverse Circulation, a term used in drilling rig
- Ridge Connector
- Ritchey–Chrétien telescope, a specialized variant of the Cassegrain telescope
- Lexus RC, a compact executive two-door GT coupé
- Peugeot RC, a concept car
- "Rc" or "R_{c}" may refer to the C scale of the Rockwell scale, though this is normally denoted "HRC"

== Arts and entertainment ==
- RC (Toy Story), a character from the Disney Pixar film franchise
- Refused Classification, a designation by the Office of Film and Literature Classification (Australia) for a banned film
- Star Wars: Republic Commando, a first-person shooter game for Xbox and PC
- Robot Chicken, a TV show on Adult Swim
- Rubik's Cube, a toy

== Businesses and organizations ==
- Atlantic Airways (IATA airline code RC)
- Rainforest Cafe, a jungle-themed restaurant chain
- Recurse Center, a programming retreat and intentional community in New York, New York, United States
- Re-evaluation Counseling, an organization for personal growth and social change
- Resistance Council of Uganda
- Restorative Circles, a community-based form of restorative justice
- Civil Revolution, a short-lived political alliance in Italy
- Union Revolutionary Council, the supreme governing body of Burma from 1962 to 1974
- Royal Caribbean Group, a cruise line holding company
  - Royal Caribbean International, a cruise line brand owned by Royal Caribbean Group
- Royal commission, a major ad-hoc formal public inquiry into a defined issue in some monarchies
- Royal Crown Cola, a soda producer, also known as RC Cola

== Schools ==
- Renaissance College, Hong Kong
- Residential College at Mary Foust, a living-learning residence hall at UNCG
- Ridley College, a private boarding school in St. Catharines, Ontario, Canada
- Riverside College, Inc., a medical college in the Philippines
- Roanoke College, a private college in Salem, Virginia, United States
- Robert College, a private high school in Istanbul, Turkey

== People ==
- R. C. Buford, American basketball executive
- R. C. Orlan, baseball player
- R. C. Slocum, American football player and coach
- Richard Childress, a NASCAR team owner
- Roberto Carlos, a retired Brazilian football player
- Ram Charan (born 1985), Indian actor

== Sports ==
- Rogers Centre, a multi-purpose stadium, home of the Toronto Blue Jays and Toronto Argonauts
- Rosario Central, a football club in Argentina
- Royal Challengers Bangalore, an Indian Premier League team
- Runs created, a baseball statistic
- Rugby Club

== Other uses ==
- ṛc "verse" in Sanskrit
- rc "R's chankas
- RC Roads, Puducherry, India
- Acronym of Metropolitan City of Reggio Calabria, a metropolitan city in southern Italy.
- Relative clause, in linguistics, a subordinate clause that modifies a noun
- Reserve Component, in the United States military
- Revenue Commissioners, in Ireland
- Roman Catholic, a religion

== See also ==
- Arcee, a female Autobot from the Transformers
- Arsie, Belluno, Veneto, Italy
- Arsy, Oise, Hauts-de-France, France
- CR (disambiguation)
- R (disambiguation)
- C (disambiguation)
