= List of Leica cameras =

This is a list of Leica cameras. Leica Camera AG is a German optics company which produces Leica cameras. The predecessor of the company, formerly known as Ernst Leitz GmbH, is now three companies: Leica Camera AG, Leica Geosystems AG, and Leica Microsystems AG, producing cameras, geosurvey equipment, and microscopes, respectively. The Leica cameras are grouped by camera model and year of release.

== Point & Shoot ==
From the Leica Camera Forum:

Model	Date	Quantities/Comments	Shutter type	Shutter speed	Aperture	Metering mode	Flash	Battery	Dimensions (WxHxD) (mm)	Weight (g)
AF-C1	1989–1991	Rebadged Minolta Freedom Tele (aka AF-Tele Super or Mac-Tele)	Focal plane		f/2.8 (wide) / f/5.6 (tele)					

== Rangefinder ==
Model	Date	Quantities/Comments	Shutter type	Shutter speed	Aperture	Metering mode	Flash	Battery	Dimensions (WxHxD) (mm)	Weight (g)
Leica 2F	1952–1954		Focal Plane	B to 1/1000		Nil		Nil		
Leica IIIf	1950–1954		Focal-plane	B, 1→1/1000		Nil		Nil	148 x 97 x 57	
Leica M3	1954–1966		Focal-plane	B, 1→1/1000		Nil	X-sync and Flash bulb 1/50	Nil	138 x 77 x 38	
Leica MP (M professional)	1956–1957		Focal-plane	B, 1→1/1000		Nil	X-sync and Flash bulb 1/50	Nil	138 x 77 x 38	
Leica IIIg	1956–1960	last LTM	Focal-plane	B, 1→1/1000		Nil		Nil	136 x 65 x 39	
Leica Ig	1957–1960	no rangefinder	Focal-plane	B, 1→1/1000		Nil		Nil	136 x 65 x 39	
Leica M2	1957–1968		Focal-plane	B, 1→1/1000		Nil	1/50	Nil	138 x 77 x 38	
Leica M1	1959–1964		Focal-plane	B, 1→1/1000		Nil	1/50	Nil	148 x 97 x 57	545
Leica MD	1964–1966		Focal-plane	B, 1→1/1000		Nil	1/50	Nil	148 x 97 x 57	
Leica M4	1967–1975		Focal-plane	B, 1→1/1000		Nil	1/50	Nil	148 x 97 x 57	
Leica MDa	1966–1976		Focal-plane	B, 1→1/1000		Nil	1/50	Nil	148 x 97 x 57	
Leica M2-R	1969		Focal-plane	B, 1→1/1000		Nil	1/50	Nil	138 x 77 x 38	
Leica M5	1971–1975		Focal-plane	B, 1/2→1/1000		TTL CdS cell	1/50	PX-625	155(2-lug) × 84 × 36	
Leica CL	1973–1976		Focal-plane	B, 1/2→1/1000		TTL			148 x 97 x 57	
Leica M4-2	1978–1980		Focal-plane	B, 1→1/1000		Nil	1/50	Nil	148 x 97 x 57	
Leica MD-2	1980–86		Focal-plane	B, 1→1/1000		Nil	1/50		148 x 97 x 57	
Leica M4-P	1981–1987		Focal-plane	B, 1→1/1000		Nil	1/50	Nil	148 x 97 x 57	
Leica M6	1984–1998		Focal-plane	B, 1→1/1000		TTL	1/50	SR44 x 2	148 x 97 x 57	
Leica M6 TTL	1998–2002		Focal-plane	B, 1→1/1000		TTL	1/50	SR44 x 2	148 x 97 x 57	
Leica M7	2002–2018		Focal-plane	B, 1→1/1000		TTL	1/50	CR-2 x 2	138 x 79.5 x 38	610 (without batteries)
Leica MP (Mechanical Perfection)	2003–		Focal-plane	B, 1→1/1000		TTL Si cell	1/50	CR-2 x 2	138 x 77 x 38	585 (without Batteries)
Leica M8 (digital)	2006–2009	APS-H	Focal-plane	B, 32→1/8000		TTL	1/250	Li ion (3.7 V Leica)	139 x 37 × 80	591 (incl. battery)
Leica M8.2 (digital)	2008–2009	APS-H - better UV	Focal-plane	B, 32→1/4000		TTL	1/180	Li ion (3.7 V Leica)	139 x 37 × 80	591 (incl. battery)
Leica M9 (digital)	2009–		Focal-plane	B, 32→1/4000		TTL	1/180	Li ion (3.7 V Leica)	139 × 80 x 37	589 (incl. battery)
Leica M9-P (digital)	2011–		Focal-plane	B, 32→1/4000		TTL	1/180	Li ion (3.7 V Leica)	139 × 80 x 37	600 (incl. battery)
Leica M Monochrome (digital)	2012–		Focal-plane	B, 32→1/4000		TTL	1/180	Li ion (3.7 V Leica)	139 × 80 x 37	680 (incl. battery)
Leica M-E typ 220 (digital)	2012–		Focal-plane	B, 32→1/4000		TTL	1/180	Li ion (3.7 V Leica)	139 × 80 × 37	585 (incl. battery)
Leica M typ 240 (digital)	2012–		Focal-plane	B, 60→1/4000		TTL	1/180	Li ion (7.4 V Leica)	139 x 80 x 42	680 (incl. battery)
Leica M-P typ 240 (digital)	2012–	Frame selector back	Focal-plane	B, 32→1/4000		TTL	1/180	Li ion (7.4 V Leica)	139 x 80 x 42	680 (incl. battery)
Leica M-A typ 127 (film)	2014–		Focal-plane	B, 1→1/1000		Nil	1/50	Nil	138 x 77 x 38	578
Leica M Monochrom typ 246 (digital)	2015–		Focal-plane	B, 60→1/4000		TTL	1/180	Li ion (7.4 V Leica)	138.6 × 80 × 42	680
Leica M typ 262 (digital)	2015–		Focal-plane	B, 60→1/4000		1/180	TTL	Li ion (7.4 V Leica)	138.6 × 80 × 42	600 (incl. battery)
Leica M-D typ 262 (digital)	2016–	No screen	Focal-plane	B, 60→1/4000		TTL	1/180	Li ion (7.4 V Leica)	138.6 × 80 × 42	680 (incl. battery)
Leica M10 typ 3656 (digital)	2017–	slimmer model	Focal-plane	B, 125→1/4000		TTL	1/180	Li ion (7.4 V Leica)	139 x 80 x 39	660 (incl. battery)
Leica M10-P (digital)	2018–	quieter shutter	Focal-plane	B, 125→1/4000		TTL	1/180	Li ion (7.4 V Leica)	139 x 80 x 39	660 (incl. battery)
Leica M10-D (digital)	2018–	No screen	Focal-plane	B, 125→1/4000		TTL	1/180	Li ion (7.4 V Leica)	139 x 80 x 39	660 (incl. battery)
Leica M typ 240 E edition (digital)	2019–		Focal-plane	B, 60→1/4000		TTL	1/180	Li ion (7.4 V Leica)	138.6 × 80 × 42	680 (incl. battery)
Leica M10 Monochrom (digital)	2020–		Focal-plane	B, 8→1/4000		TTL	1/180	Li ion (7.4 V Leica)	139 × 80 x 38.5	660 (incl. battery)
Leica M11	2022–		Focal-plane			TTL				
Leica M11-P	2023–		Focal-plane							

== SLR ==
These series of cameras were mainly designed by Willi Wiessner.

Model	Date	Quantities	Shutter	Shutter	Aperture	Metering Mode	Flash	Battery	Dimensions (WxHxD) (mm)	Weight (g)
Leicaflex Mark I	1964–1968								148 x 97 x 57	
Leicaflex Mark II	1965–1968								148 x 97 x 57	
Leicaflex SL	1968–1974								148 x 97 x 57	
Leicaflex SL-MOT	1968–1974								148 x 97 x 57	
Leicaflex SL2	1974–1976								148 x 97 x 57	
Leicaflex SL2-MOT	1974–1976								148 x 97 x 57	
Leica R3	1977–1980								148 x 97 x 57	
Leica R3-MOT	1978–1980								148 x 97 x 57	
Leica R4-MOT	1980–1987								148 x 97 x 57	
Leica R4 (same as R4-MOT but name changed)	1980–1987								148 x 97 x 57	
Leica R4S	1984–1988								148 x 97 x 57	
Leica R5	1987–1992								148 x 97 x 57	
Leica R-E	1990–1992								148 x 97 x 57	
Leica R6	1988–1992								148 x 97 x 57	
Leica R6.2	1992–2001								148 x 97 x 57	
Leica R7	1992–1996								148 x 97 x 57	
Leica R8	1996–2002	N/A				TTL	1/250	CR-2 x 2	158 x 101 x 62	890
Leica R9	2002–	N/A				TTL	1/250	CR-2 x 2	158 x 101 x 62	790
