= Lists of cameras =

Lists of cameras include the following.

== By brand ==
- List of Canon cameras
- List of Red Digital Cinema cameras
- List of Instax cameras
- List of Leica cameras
- List of Zink cameras
- List of Sony cameras
  - List of Sony α cameras
  - List of Sony E-mount cameras
  - List of Sony A-mount cameras
  - List of Sony Cyber-shot cameras

== By type ==
- List of Micro Four Thirds cameras
- List of bridge cameras
- List of large sensor fixed-lens cameras
- List of large sensor interchangeable-lens video cameras
- List of superzoom compact cameras

== By feature ==
- List of omnidirectional (360-degree) cameras
- List of cameras supporting a raw format
- List of cameras which provide geotagging

== By location ==
- List of cameras on the International Space Station

== See also ==
- List of camera types
- List of digital camera brands
