= Leica M6 =

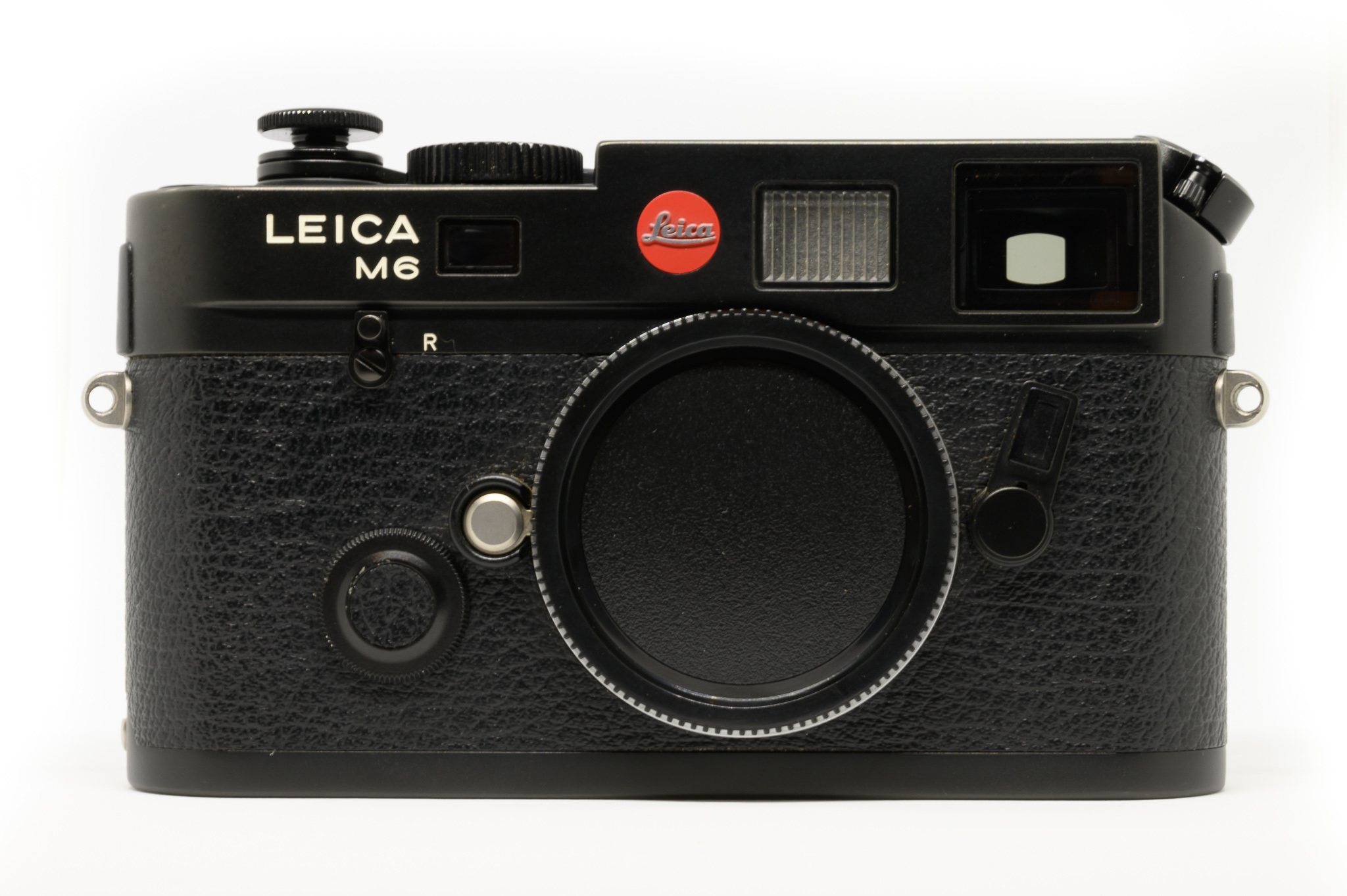
- Leica M6 TTL

Overview
- Maker: Leica Camera
- Type: Rangefinder
- Released: 1984

Lens
- Lens mount: Leica M-mount
- Lens: Interchangeable lens

Sensor/medium
- Film format: 35mm
- Film size: 36mm x 24mm
- Film speed: ISO 6-6400
- Film speed detection: Manual setting
- Film advance: Manual
- Film rewind: Manual

Focusing
- Focus modes: Split and superposed-image rangefinder

Exposure/metering
- Exposure modes: Manual (M), and Bulb (B)
- Metering modes: Center-weighted (13% of full film format)

Flash
- Flash: Hot Shoe, PC Sync
- Flash synchronization: 1/50s

Shutter
- Shutter: Mechanically timed horizontal running cloth shutter
- Shutter speed range: 1s - 1/1000s with Bulb and 1/50s flash sync

Viewfinder
- Viewfinder: Brightline frame viewfinder with automatic parallax-compensation
- Viewfinder magnification: 0.58x, 0.72x, 0.85x

General
- Battery: 3v from 2x PX76/SR44 silver oxide cell or 1x DL 1/3N lithium cell
- Optional motor drives: Leica Motor-M, Winder-M, Winder 4-P and Winder 4-2
- Dimensions: 138 mm × 77 mm × 33.5 mm (5.43 in × 3.03 in × 1.32 in)
- Weight: 585 g (20.6 oz)
- Made in: Germany

The Leica M6 is a 35mm rangefinder film camera manufactured by Leica from 1984 to 1998, followed by the M6 "TTL" manufactured from 1998 to 2002. In 2022, Leica introduced a new version of the M6, based on the technology of the Leica MP, but staying true to the design of the M6.

The M6 incorporates a light meter within the body dimensions established by the previous Leica M3 and Leica M4 models. The light meter was operated by depressing the shutter halfway, had no moving parts, and used LEDs to display readings in the viewfinder. Informally it is referred to as the M6 "Classic" to distinguish it from the "M6 TTL" models, and to indicate its "Classic" M3 dimensions.

The top and bottom plates were made from lighter, cheaper magnesium alloy rather than the heavier machined brass of the M3 and M4. The M6 and M6 TTL are mechanical cameras; all functions except the light meter work without batteries, unlike the succeeding M7, which needs electrical power to operate the light meter or shutter speeds other than 1/60 and 1/125 of a second.

== Leica M6 variants ==
- M6J – 1994. A collector's edition of 1,640 cameras to celebrate the 40th anniversary of the Leica M System. Notable for its introduction of the 0.85 magnification finder, the first high-magnification finder since 1966, and the basis for the 0.85 cameras to follow starting in 1998.
- M6 0.85 – 1998. The 0.85x magnification viewfinder was offered on regular production cameras for easier and more accurate focusing with long focal length or wide aperture lenses, such as the 50 mm f/1.0 Noctilux and 75 mm f/1.4 Summilux. The 28 mm framelines are dropped in this model. Only 3,130 of these cameras were made (all black chrome), so they are among the less common regular production of the M6.
- M6 TTL – 1998–2002. The M6 TTL replaced the M6, which ceased manufacture. Originally available with 0.72x and 0.85x viewfinders, in 2000 a 0.58x viewfinder version was added to the line. The lower magnification viewfinder makes it easier to see the 28mm framelines, especially when wearing glasses. The shutter dial of the M6 TTL is reversed from previous models, turning in the same direction as the light meter arrows in the viewfinder; this feature has continued in the M7, M8, and M9, but not the MP, which returned to the older, smaller diameter, opposite direction shutter speed dial. One of the key differences to the M6 "Classic" is TTL flash capability with dedicated flash units, such as the SF-20. The added electronics increased the height of the top plate by 2 mm.
- M6 reissue – 2022. In October 2022, Leica announced a variant of the MP with cosmetic changes to closely but not exactly replicate an early production M6 with 0.72x viewfinder magnification. It features brass top and bottom plates, "Leitz" red dot logo, "ERNST LEITZ WETZLAR GERMANY" top plate engraving, M11-type abrasion-resistant black lacquer and leatherette, and "MADE IN GERMANY" embossing on the back.

== Specifications ==
- Viewfinder: 0.58×, 0.72×, and 0.85×
- Framelines: 0.58× (28–90, 35, 50–75), 0.72× (28–90, 35–135, 50–75), 0.85× (35–135, 50–75, 90)
- Shutter speeds: 1 sec., 1/2, 1/4, 1/8, 1/15, 1/30, [detent at 1/50 for flash synchronization], 1/60, 1/125, 1/250, 1/500, 1/1000, B [M6 TTL adds "off" position to shutter dial]
- Film speed: 6–6400 ISO
- Power supply [for exposure meter operation only]: 2 silver oxide button cells (type SR44) or 1 lithium battery (1/3 N)

== Leica M6 special editions ==
The Leica M6 has more special editions than any other M cameras as of 2013. The following list includes some, but not all Leica M6 Special Editions:

- Leica M6 Cutaway
- Leica M6 150 Jahre Photographie - 1989 - 75 Jahre Leica Photographie: 1250 cameras
- Leica M6 Colombo '92 (1492 - 1992: 500° Scoperta dell'America - Italia): 200 cameras
- Leica M6 Royal-Foto Austria (1968 - 1993): 101 cameras
- Leica M6J 40 Jahre Leica M (1954 - 1994): 1640 cameras
- Leica M6 Dragon (gold plated): 300 cameras
- Leica M6 Historica (1975 - 1995): 150 cameras
- Leica M6 Royal Wedding: 200 cameras
- Leica M6 Thai Jubilee (50th year of the reign of His Majesty King Bhumiphol Adulyadej): 700 cameras
- Leica M6 Anton Bruckner (1824 - 1896): 200 cameras
- Leica M6 Brunei: 200 platinum plated cameras (125 platinum plated with diamonds) and 350 gold plated cameras
- Leica M6 Partners: 500 cameras
- Leica M6 Leica Demo Ausrüstung Benelux '96: 70 cameras
- Leica M6 Ein Stück Leica: 996 cameras
- Leica M6 Jaguar XK (1948 - 1998): 50 cameras
- Leica M6 Millennium: only 2000 cameras (300 with 0.85× viewfinder and green leatherette)
- Leica M6 Dragon (viewfinder 0.85x, black painted): 500 cameras
- Leica M6 ICS: 200 cameras
- Leica M6 LHSA (Leica Historical Society of America): 101 cameras
- Leica M6 Øresundsbron: 150 cameras
- Leica M6 Henri Cartier-Bresson (with Vuitton case): only 1 camera
- Leica M6 William Klein: only 1 camera (1993)
- Leica M6 50 Jahre fotoMAGAZIN: only 1 camera (1999)
- Leica M6 Swiss Demo (Test the best): 40 cameras
- Leica M6 Zurich Photographic Center: 100 cameras
- Leica M6 Royal Photographic Society: 100 cameras (1994)
- Leica M6 Platinum Optics: 150 cameras
- Leica M6 Schmidt Centenary: 151 cameras
- Leica M6 Canada: 270 cameras
- Leica M6 Year of Rooster: 300 cameras
- Leica M6 999: 999 cameras
- Leica M6 Titanium: circa 6000 and 1000 in TTL-version

== Gallery ==
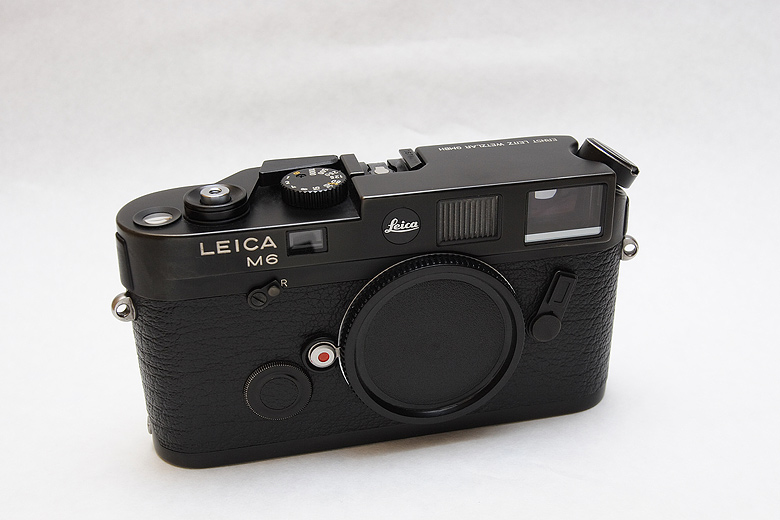
Early Leica M6 black dot

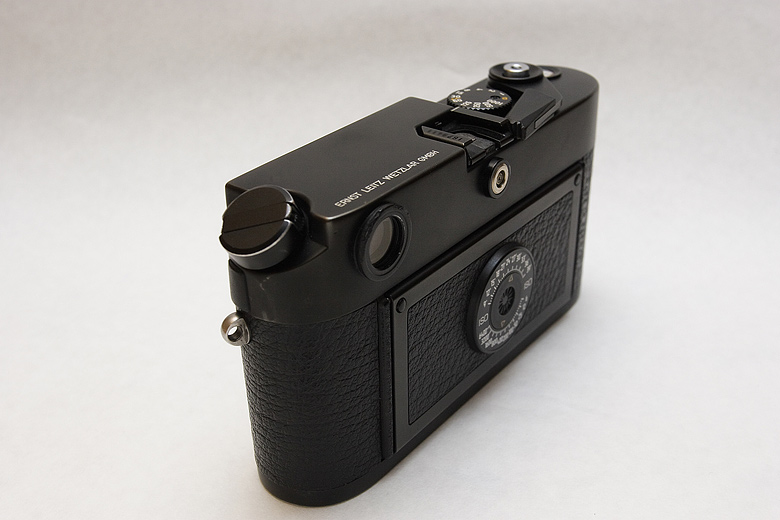
Early Leica M6 black dot
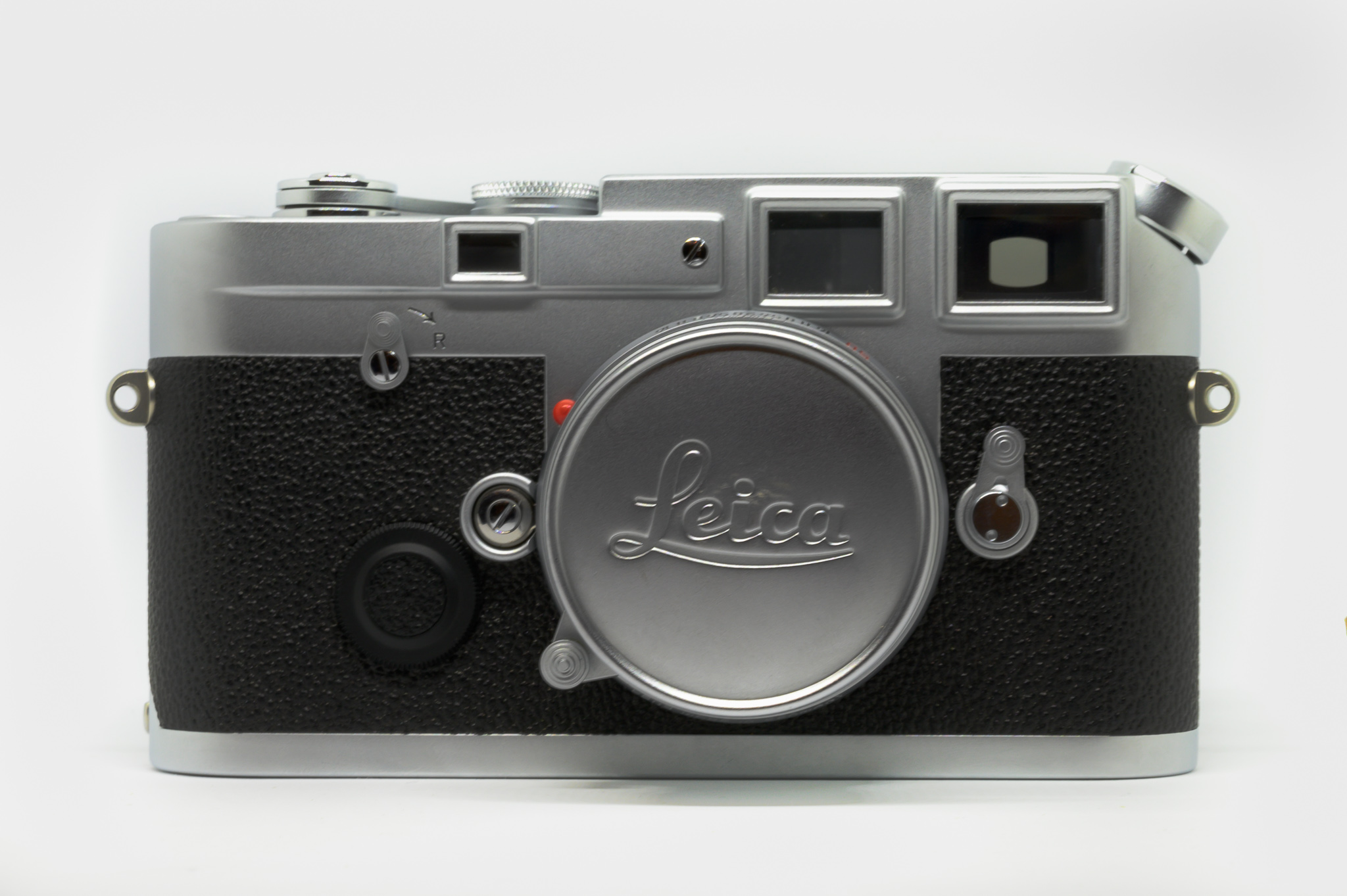
Leica M6J front

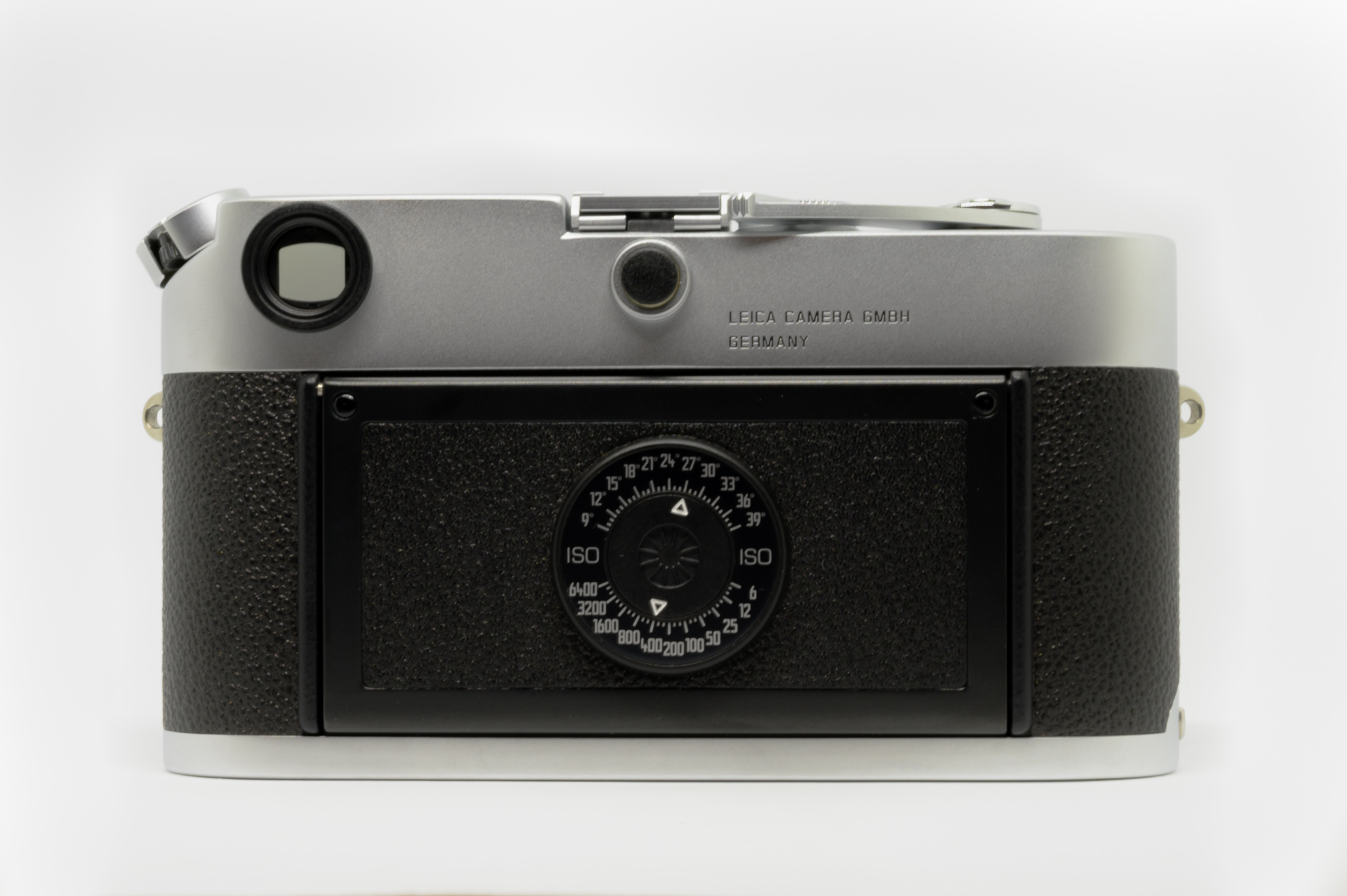
Leica M6J back

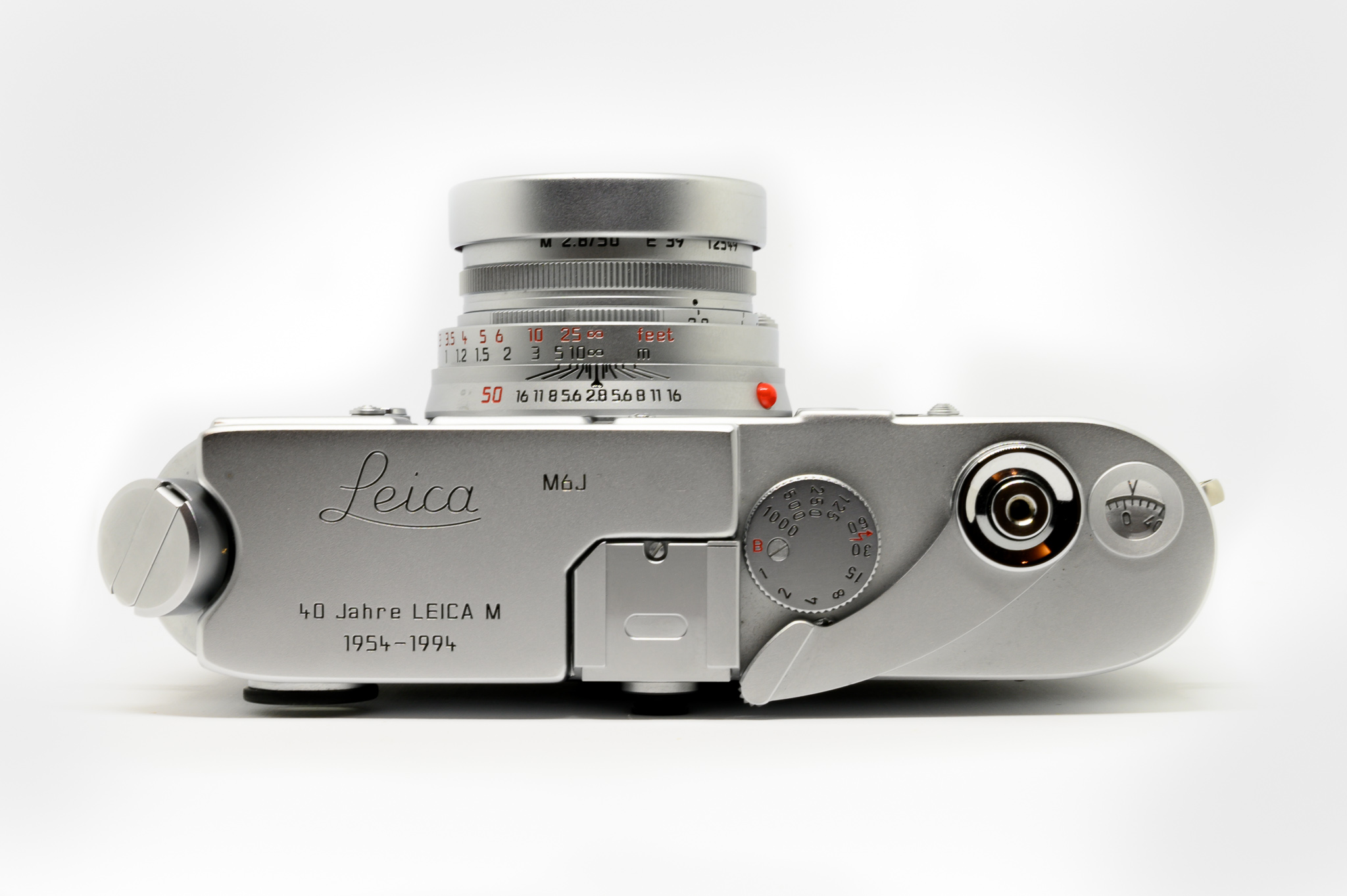
Leica M6J top
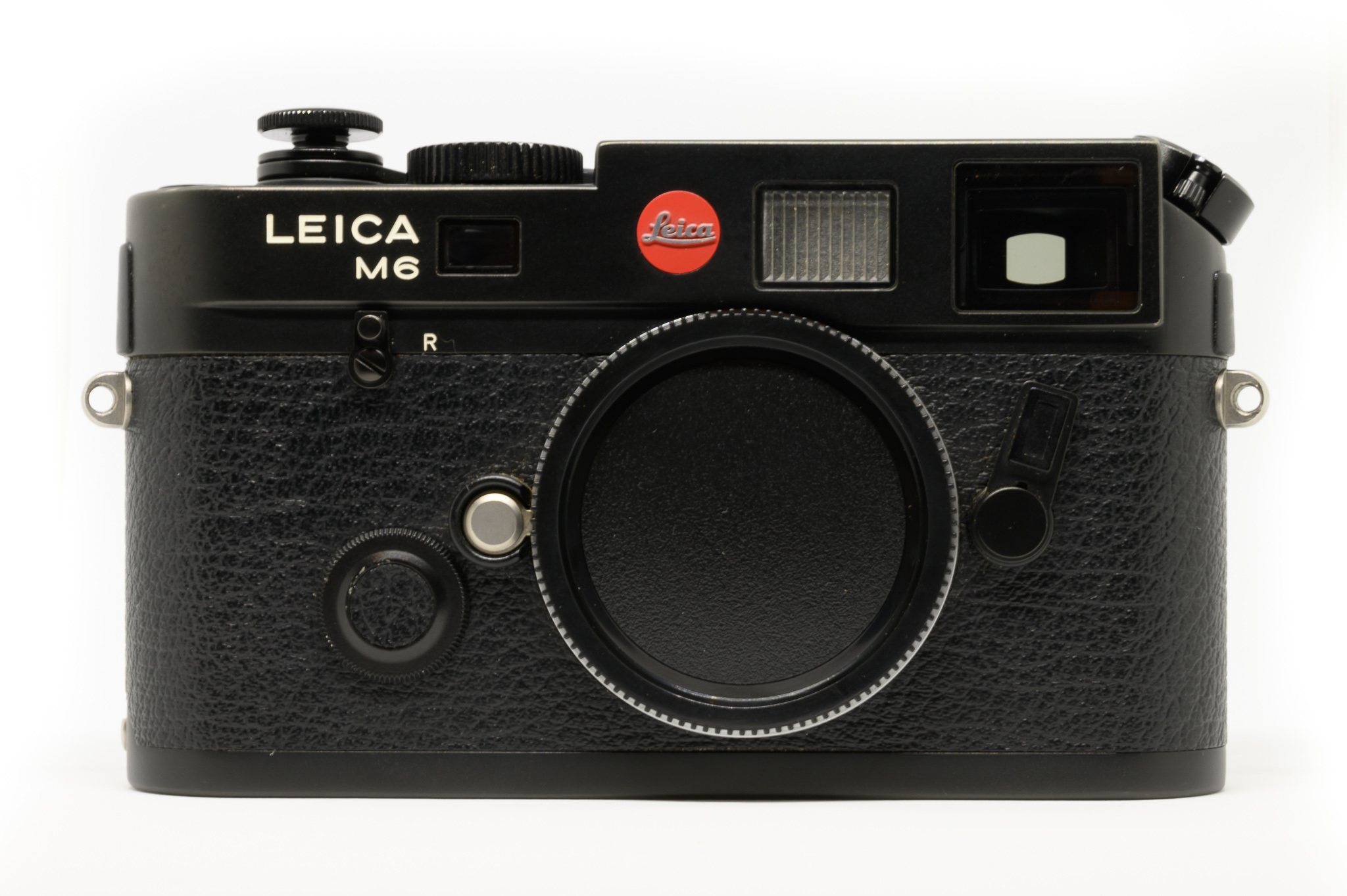
Leica M6 TTL front

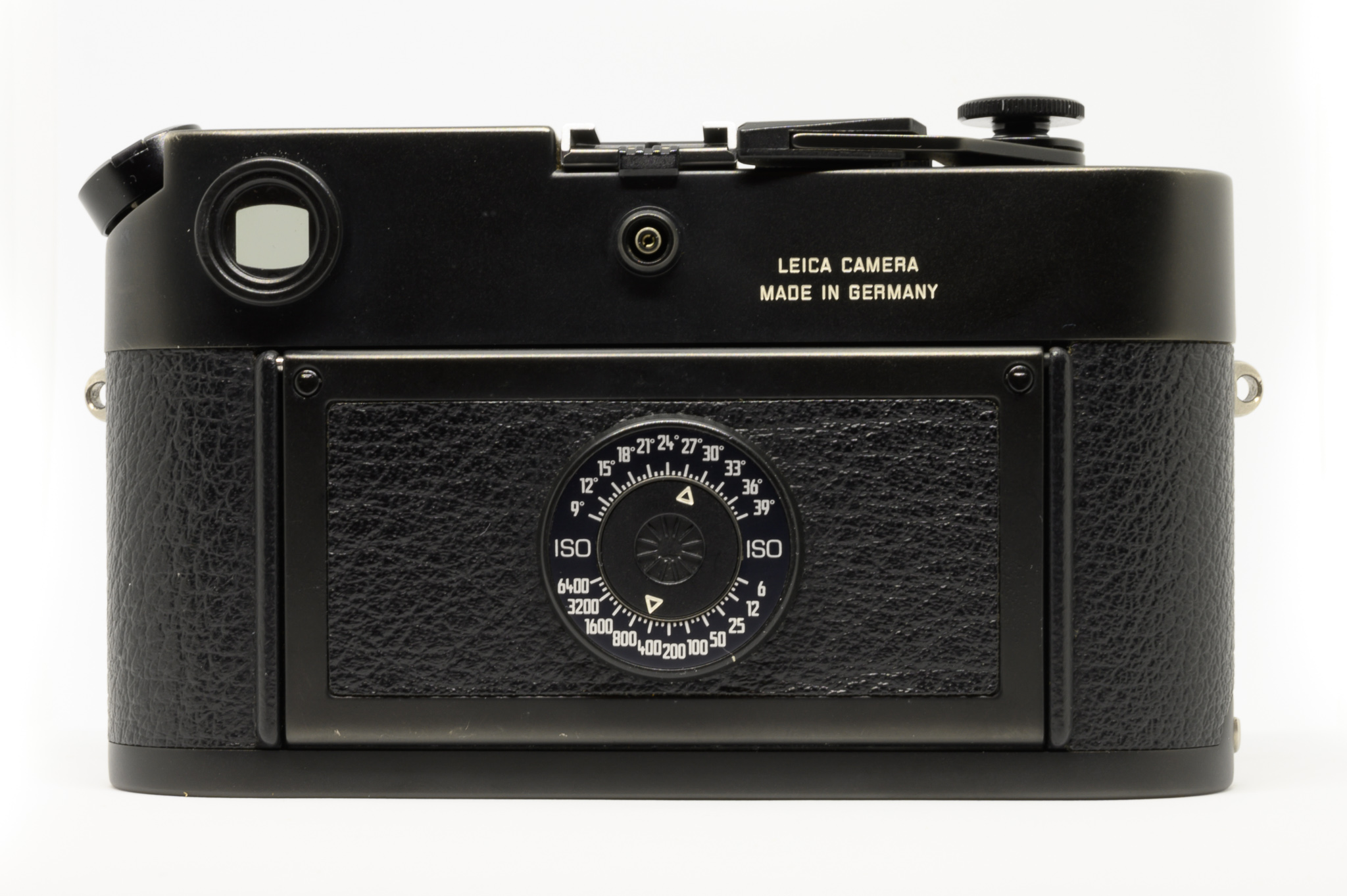
Leica M6 TTL back

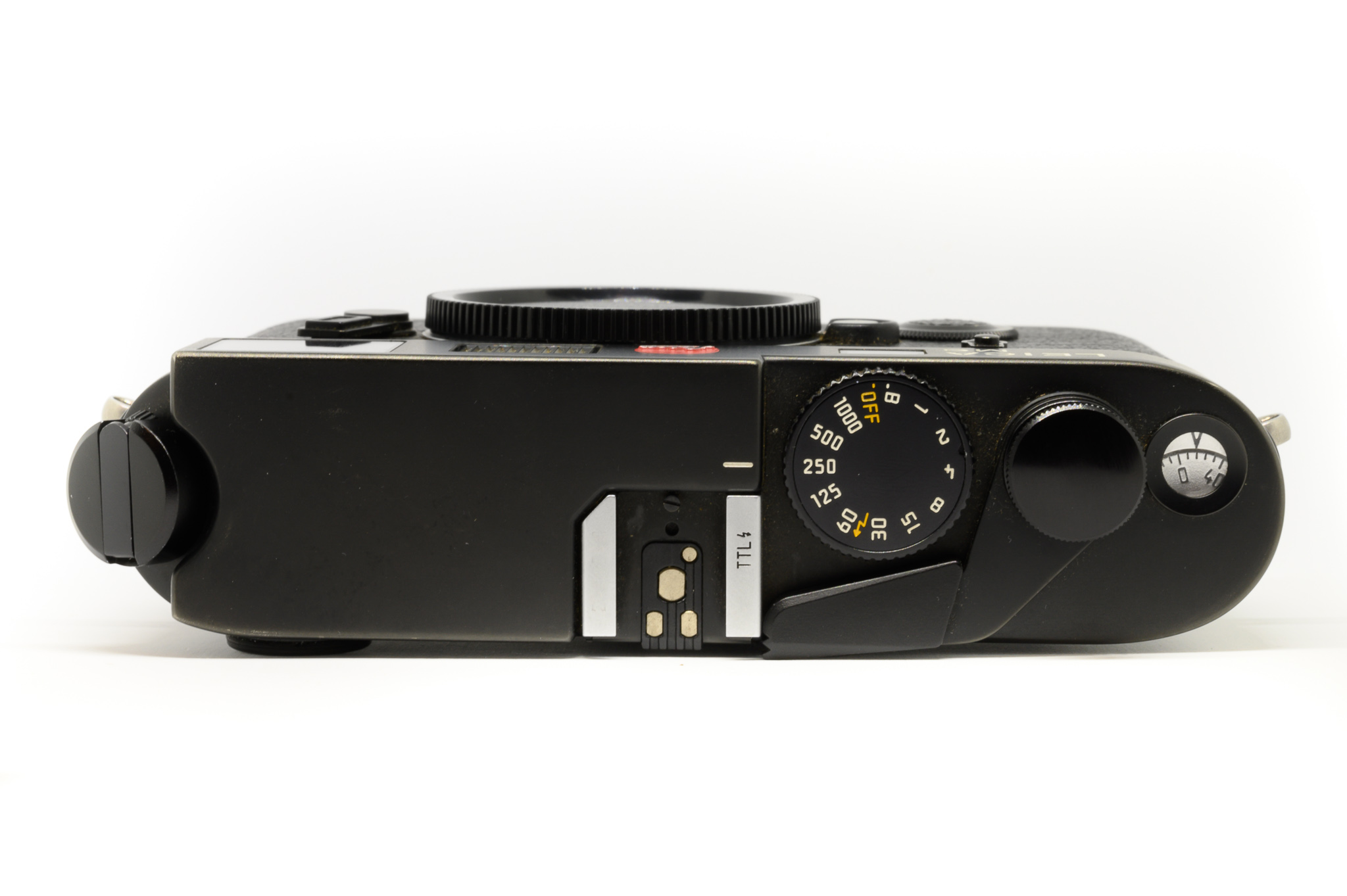
Leica M6 TTL top

Type	1950s										1960s										1970s										1980s										1990s										2000s										2010s										2020s									
Type	50	51	52	53	54	55	56	57	58	59	60	61	62	63	64	65	66	67	68	69	70	71	72	73	74	75	76	77	78	79	80	81	82	83	84	85	86	87	88	89	90	91	92	93	94	95	96	97	98	99	00	01	02	03	04	05	06	07	08	09	10	11	12	13	14	15	16	17	18	19	20	21	22	23	24	25	26	27	28	29
Leica					M3																																																																											
Leica								M2																																																																								
Leica																	M4							M4		M4-2				M4-P			M6															M6 TTL						MP																										
Leica																						M5																															M7																				M6							
Leica										M1														Leica CL																																									M-A (127)															
Non-Leica	Konica Hexar RF • 35mm Bessa • Cosina Voigtländer • Minolta CLE • Rollei 35 RF • Zeiss Ikon																																																																															
