= Digital Classic Camera Leica M3 =

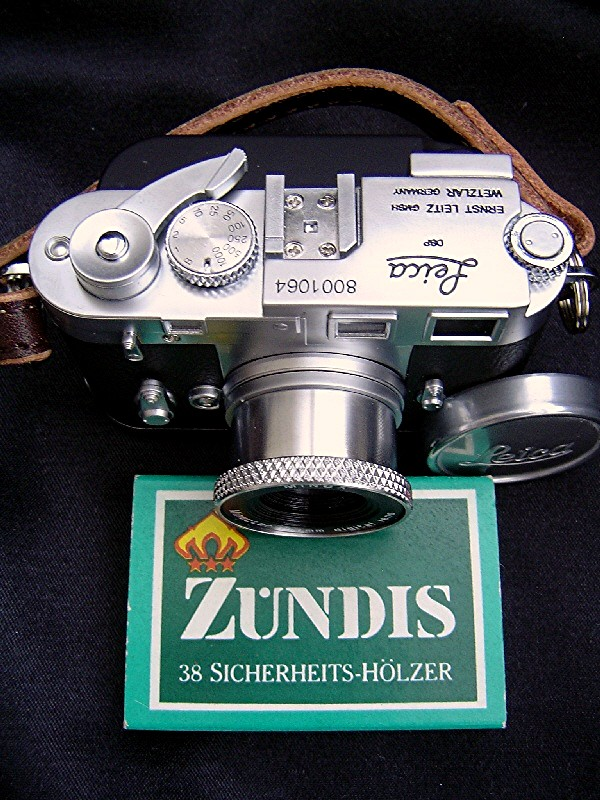

Overview
- Type: Toy compact digital camera

Sensor/medium
- Storage media: 32 MB, readable by PC through USB-cable

Exposure/metering
- Exposure metering: auto exposure

General
- Battery: CR2 battery
- Weight: 95 g (3 oz) without CR2 battery

The Digital Classic Camera Leica M3 is a miniature replica camera made by Minox with the outward appearance of a Leica M3 viewfinder camera. It has a digital camera processor made by Zoran. The body is made of metal, covered with leatherette. Some of the metal levers are movable but without function. The camera is very small and light. A special flash in retro style is available for the Minox series of classic analog and digital replica cameras. Two buttons and a two digit display comprise the user interface. A special USB-cable has to be plugged in as a computer interface. In webcam mode it had only a resolution of 320x240 pixels.

== Specifications ==
=== Digital Classic Camera Leica M3 2.1 (or 3.0) ===
- Type: digital fixed-focus camera
- Manufacturer: Minox
- Lens: Minoctar 1:2.8/9.6mm (5 elements, glass lenses plus infrared filter), equivalent to 48mm for 35mm film
- Sensor: 2.1-megapixel CMOS (1600x1200 pixels), ISO 100
- Memory: 32 MB, readable by PC through USB-cable
- Viewfinder: Galilei type optical finder
- Dwasplay: 2 digit (shows exposure countdown and mode)
- Exposure: auto exposure
- dimensions: 65 x 48 x 44 mm
- weight: 98 g without CR2 battery

=== Digital Classic Camera Leica M3 1.3 ===
- Lens: 1:3.0/10.3mm (5 elements, glass lenses plus infrared filter), equivalent to 50mm for 35mm film
- Sensor: 1.3-megapixel CMOS (1280 x 960 pixels)
- weight: 95 g without CR2 battery

=== Digital Classic Camera Leica M3 4.0 ===
- Lens: 1:2.8/9.6mm (5 elements, glass lenses plus infrared filter), equivalent to 48mm for 35mm film
- Sensor: 3.2-megapixel CMOS (2048 x 1536 pixels)
- weight: 95 g without CR2 battery

=== Digital Classic Camera Leica M3 5.0 ===
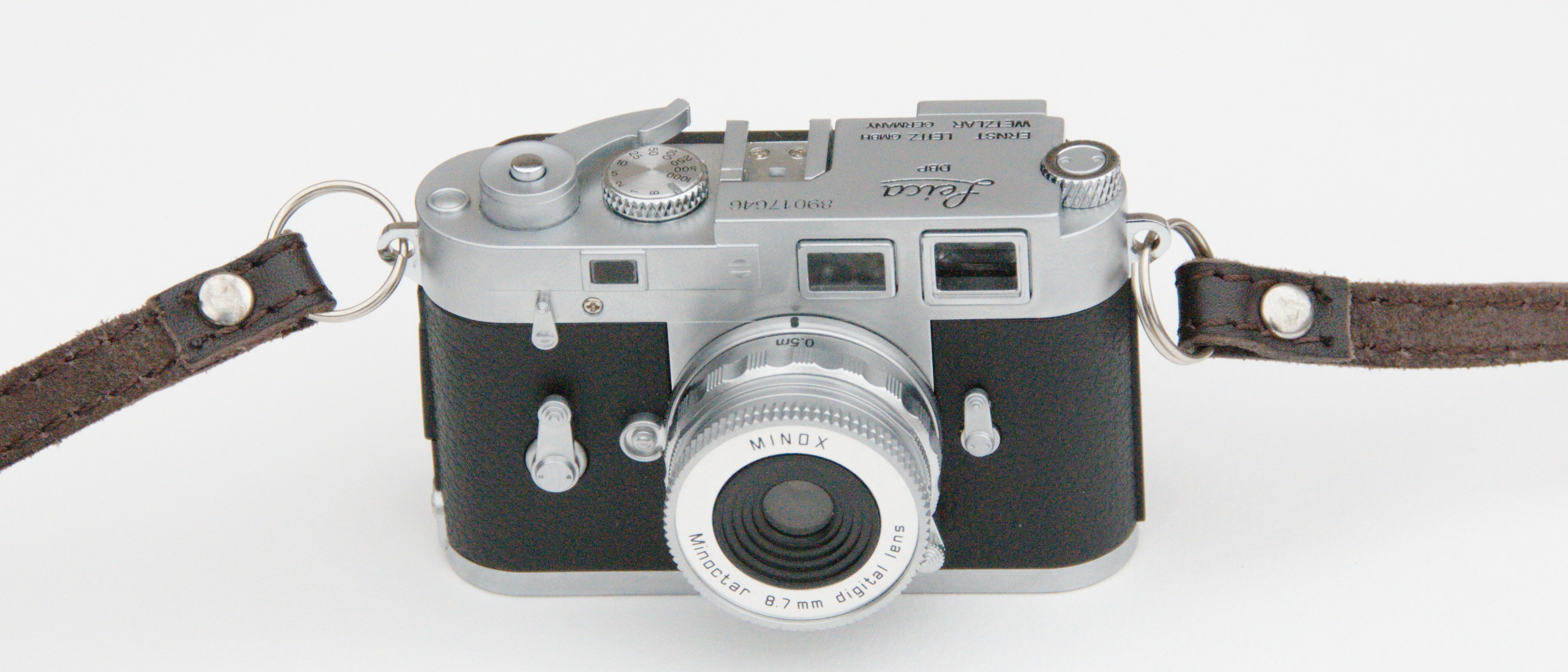

The first version with a LCD Screen and a SD slot.

- Sensor : 5.0 megapixels, CMOS (2.060 x 1.920 pixels)
- Video : 320 x 240 pixels
- Internal memory : 32 MB
- Screen : 1.5-inch TFT LCD
- Dimensions : 74mm x 47mm x 44mm
