= Leica M7 =

35 mm rangefinder camera by Leica AG

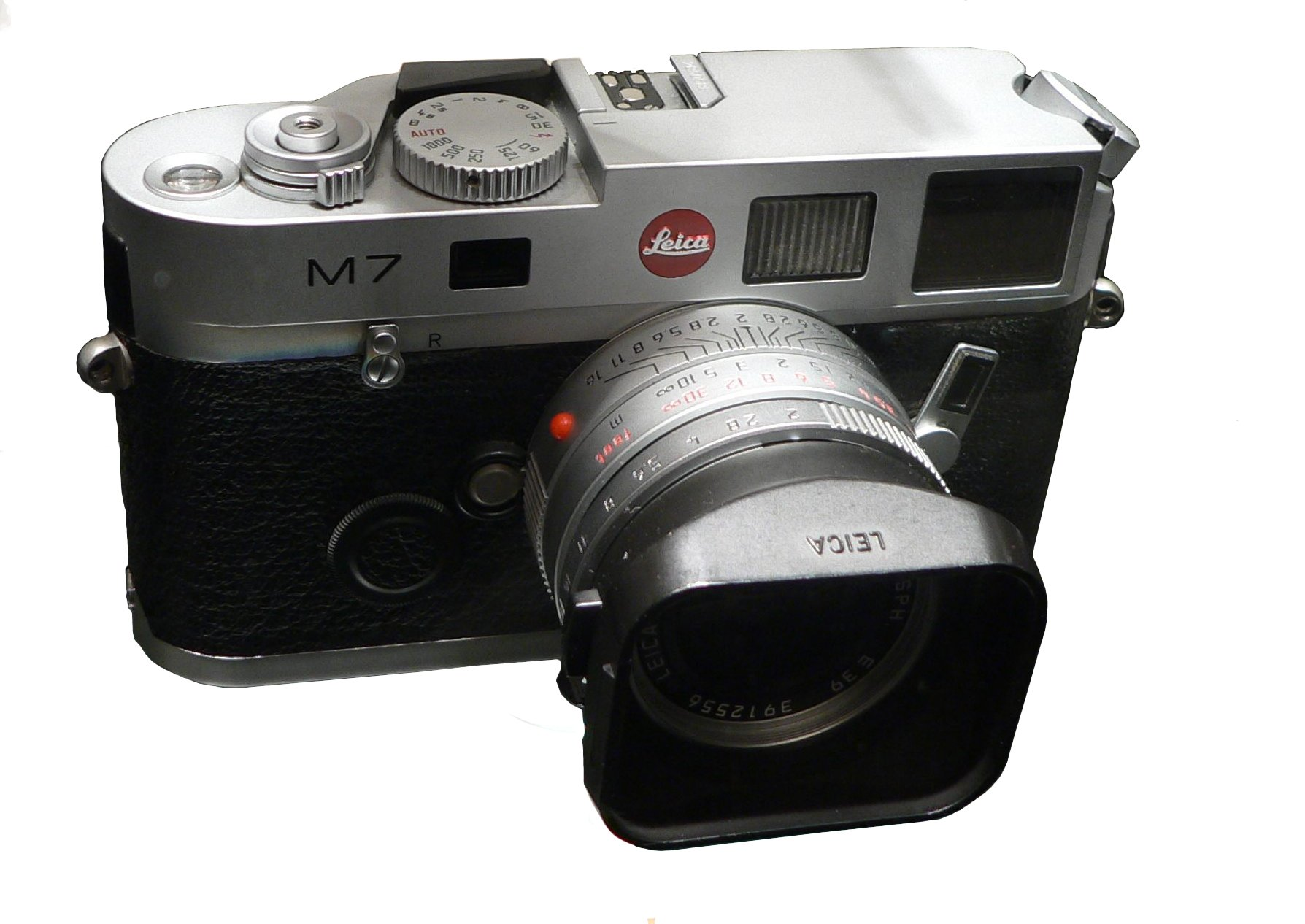

Overview
- Maker: Leica Camera
- Type: Rangefinder camera
- Released: 2002

Lens
- Lens mount: Leica M-mount

Sensor/medium
- Film format: 35 mm
- Film size: 36 x 24 mm
- Film speed: ISO 6-6400
- Film advance: Manual
- Film rewind: Manual

Focusing
- Focus: Manual

Exposure/metering
- Exposure: Aperture priority semi-automatic, Manual

Flash
- Flash: Hot Shoe
- Flash synchronization: 1/50s

Shutter
- Shutter: Electronically controlled horizontal cloth focal plane
- Shutter speed range: 32s – 1/1000s + Bulb (Auto Mode)

Viewfinder
- Viewfinder magnification: 0.58x, 0.72x, 0.85x

General
- Weight: 610 g (22 oz)

The Leica M7 is a 35 mm rangefinder camera introduced by Leica AG in 2002 as a direct successor to the M6. The electronic Leica M7 is a departure from previous mechanical designs for the M series.

== Details ==
The M7 introduced auto-exposure in aperture priority mode: the user sets the aperture on the lens manually, and the camera chooses a shutter speed. Manual exposure is also available. The shutter is electronically controlled, but speeds of 1/60 and 1/125 of a second are mechanically governed if the battery fails. Unlike the M6 TTL whose "off" position only disables the meter, the M7 features a switch on the shutter release, which prevents both metering and the shutter from firing. The shutter release is redesigned with two distinct levels of pressure: the first detent locks the exposure reading, the second fires the shutter.

The M7 is also the first Leica M series to support film DX encoding and exposure compensation using the dial that has been on the back of Leica cameras since the M3. Originally used simply as a reminder of the sensitivity of the film, and then as film speed setting coupled to the light meter starting with the M6, the dial now controls exposure compensation on the M7.

The M7 offers viewfinders with magnifications 0.58, 0.72 (28 mm), and 0.85 (35 mm). The viewfinder optics are multicoated to reduce flare.

== End of production ==
It's been reported on Red Dot Forum on 2018 May 24 that Leica has officially discontinued producing the M7 in both black and silver versions. There might be cameras in stock at retailers but no new cameras will be available once the current inventories are sold. No more orders are being taken for M7s through the "a la carte" customization program.

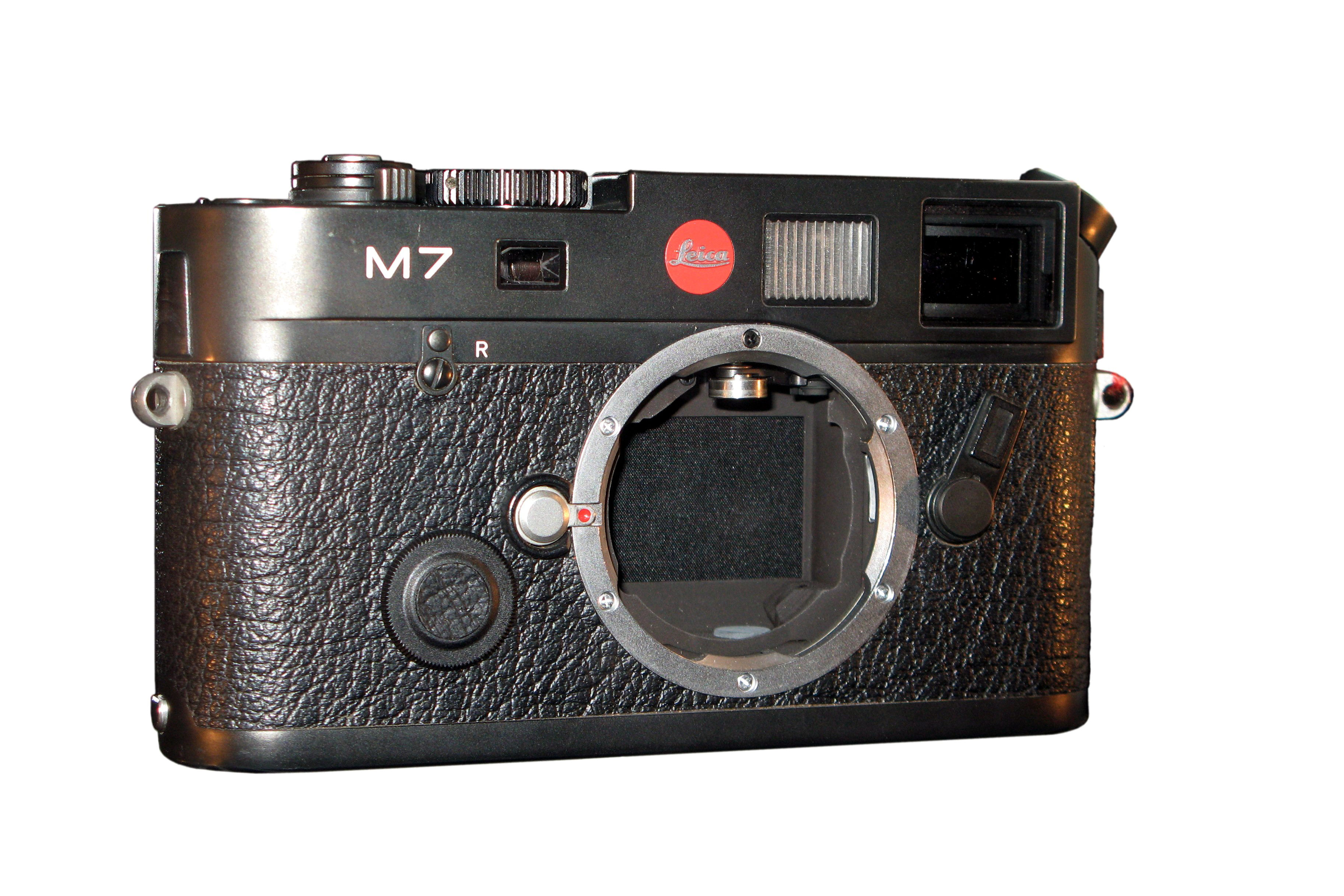
Leica M7 in black chrome

== See also ==
- Leica M8 digital rangefinder camera

Type	1950s										1960s										1970s										1980s										1990s										2000s										2010s										2020s									
Type	50	51	52	53	54	55	56	57	58	59	60	61	62	63	64	65	66	67	68	69	70	71	72	73	74	75	76	77	78	79	80	81	82	83	84	85	86	87	88	89	90	91	92	93	94	95	96	97	98	99	00	01	02	03	04	05	06	07	08	09	10	11	12	13	14	15	16	17	18	19	20	21	22	23	24	25	26	27	28	29
Leica					M3																																																																											
Leica								M2																																																																								
Leica																	M4							M4		M4-2				M4-P			M6															M6 TTL						MP																										
Leica																						M5																															M7																				M6							
Leica										M1														Leica CL																																									M-A (127)															
Non-Leica	Konica Hexar RF • 35mm Bessa • Cosina Voigtländer • Minolta CLE • Rollei 35 RF • Zeiss Ikon																																																																															
