= Leica M8 =

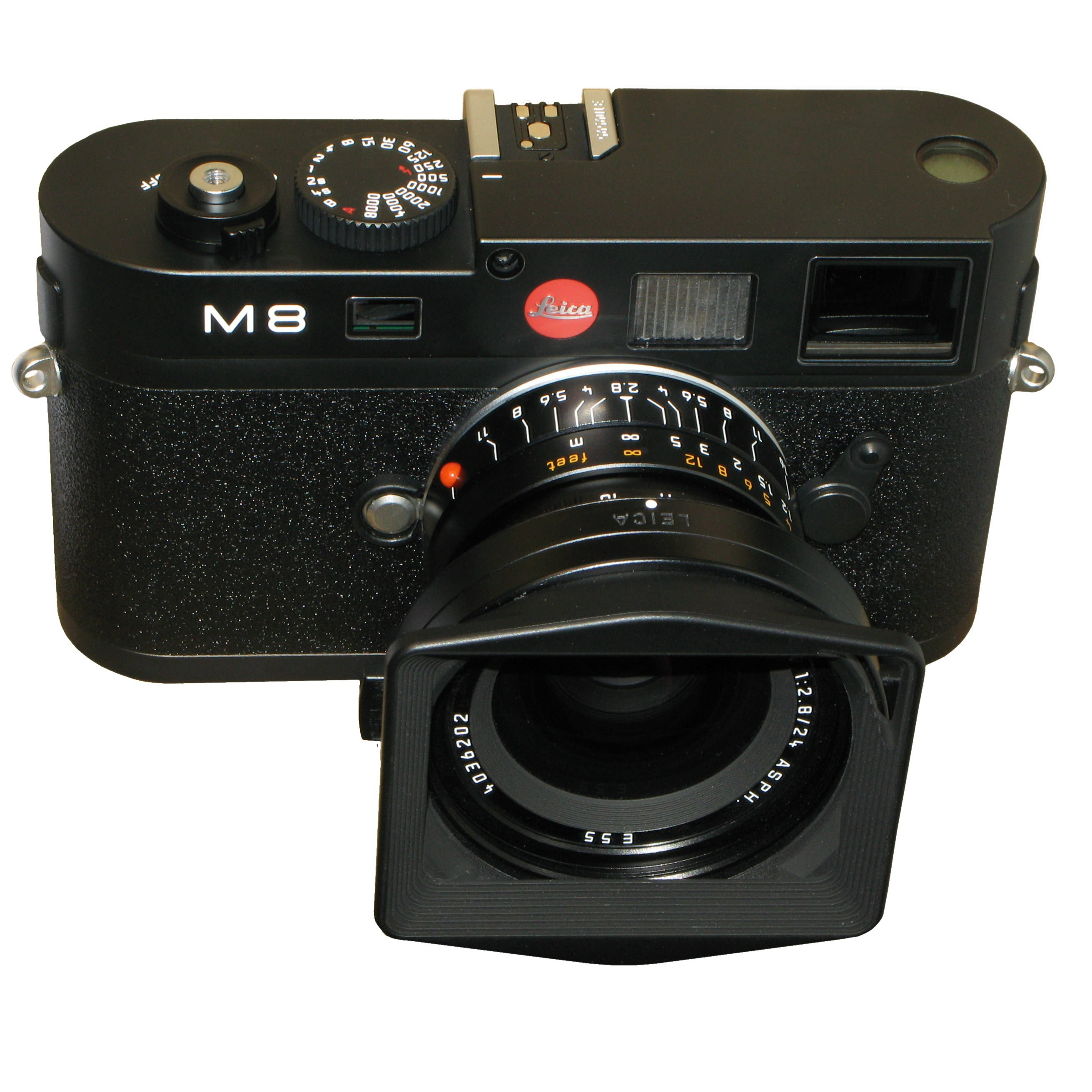

Overview
- Maker: Leica Camera
- Type: Digital rangefinder camera
- Lens mount: Leica M mount

Sensor/medium
- Sensor: 18 x 27 mm inducing a 1.33 crop factor
- Sensor type: CCD
- Maximum resolution: 10.3 effective megapixels (3936 x 2630 pixels)
- Film speed: 160 to 2500

Focusing
- Focus modes: Manual

Exposure/metering
- Exposure modes: Manual, aperture priority auto exposure
- Exposure metering: TTL, center weighted averaging

Flash
- Flash: Fixed hot shoe

Shutter
- Shutter: Focal plane, metal curtains, vertical travel
- Shutter speed range: 8s to 1/8000

Viewfinder
- Viewfinder: Reverse Galilean (x0.68) with automatic or manual selection of parallax corrected framelines, additional color LCD: 2.5", 230,000 pixels

General
- Battery: Lithium Ion
- Dimensions: 139×80×39 mm (5.5×3.1×1.5 in)
- Weight: 545 g (19 oz) without battery 591 with
- Made in: Germany

Chronology
- Successor: Leica M9

The Leica M8 is the first digital camera in the rangefinder M series introduced by Leica Camera AG on 14 September 2006. It uses an APS-H 10.3-megapixel CCD image sensor designed and manufactured by Kodak.

As of 15 November 2014, the most recent firmware version is 2.024.

== Features ==
The M8 body is slightly thicker than the classic MP and M7 (approximately ~14% thicker). It is an all-metal body made of a high-strength magnesium alloy. The top and base plates are cut from brass billets, before receiving a black or silver chrome finish.

The M8 supports all existing Leica M-mount lenses; however, some older models might not offer all the functions due to mismatching cams. All lenses are multiplied by a 1.33x crop factor, hence a 28mm lens will act approximately like a 35mm when mounted to the M8. Because the infrared filter over the sensor is relatively weak, adding an IR-cut filter in front of the lens is recommended. In addition, Leica chooses to omit the Anti-Alias filter, citing the reason for higher resolution power of the lens. However, the moiré artifacts can occur in scenes with closely spaced geometric patterns, such as fabric or mesh, distant buildings, balcony railings, corrugated roofing etc.

The M8 uses modern metal-blade focal-plane shutter. It can fire flash synchronization at 1/250 second X-sync and has a top shutter speed of 1/8000 sec. The flash system used in the M8 is M-TTL.

The camera uses a 6-bit coding system that identifies the lens in use to the electronics built into M8 body. The code is included on all current Leica lenses. To prevent excessive vignetting due to closer lens mount than in a DSLR and thus higher light rays angle on the sensor periphery, offset micro-lenses are used on the CCD. The 6-bit code on lenses gives information about optic vignetting characteristics, permitting software adjustment. The M8 uses Adobe DNG as its raw data format and the raw converter Capture One LE (included with the camera).

=== KAF-10500 Sensor ===
The KAF-10500 is a CCD imaging sensor designed by US photographic company Eastman Kodak. In September 2006 it was announced that the sensor was to be used in the M8 camera, having been specifically designed for this application. Its size is 18x27 mm (APS-H) and it has 10.3 million pixels of size 6.8 μm. Compared to 35mm film, it has a 1.33 crop factor. It is calibrated for an ISO sensitivity range of 160–2500.

The sensor includes indium tin oxide as a constituent material, which Kodak claims leads to low noise, high sensitivity, and wide dynamic range. It is designed for use with lenses with short back focal lengths – such as those common to rangefinder cameras – by including a microlens array to reduce fall off in intensity from the center to corners of the image. Further details and aspects of the sensor were unveiled during the course of Photokina 2006.

== Reception ==
The Leica M8 suffered from some controversy on its release due to image quality problems reported by some users, especially an extremely high sensitivity to infrared light, which made black colors appear purple. Leica has since released a statement saying that it will send two free special UV/IR screw-on photographic filters to all future M8 purchasers, and upon request for all current M8 users. Users experiencing other image quality problems can apply to return their M8 for repair.

However, this sensitivity to Infrared light has inspired a niche of photographers who use photographic filters that block the visible spectrum of light to do infrared photography.

== Upgrade program ==
Leica announced a perpetual upgrade program on 31 January 2008. To keep a user's M8 up to date with newer releases, owners can send their M8 to Leica for upgrades. The first upgrade offered under this program is an improved shutter designed for quieter operation, at the cost of a slower maximum shutter speed of 1/4000sec. Leica subsequently announced additional upgrades:

- Sapphire glass LCD cover
- More accurate bright line frames

== Leica M8.2 ==
Leica announced the Leica M8.2 on 15 September 2008. The Leica M8.2 includes all the upgrades offered in the upgrade program, however the black version is coated with black paint (as opposed to the black chrome finish of the standard Leica M8) and black Leica branding dot. An auto S setting producing only JPEGs was added to the shutter speed dial.

Leica also introduced the M8.2 Safari edition package, limited to a production run of 500. The package includes an olive green painted Leica M8.2, a silver-finished Leica Elmarit-M 28mm f/2.8 ASPH lens and a matching Billingham camera case.

== Gallery ==
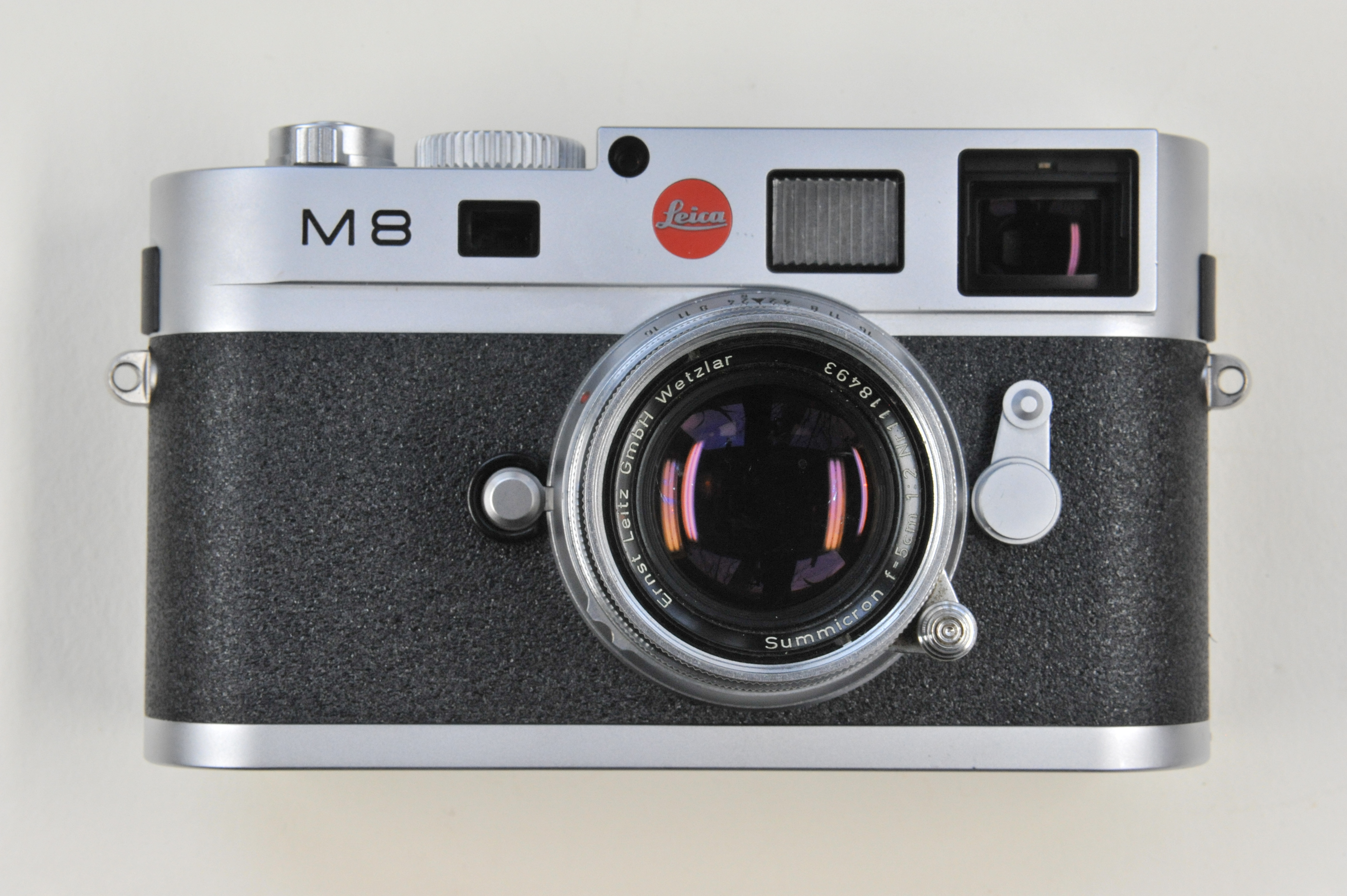
M8 front view

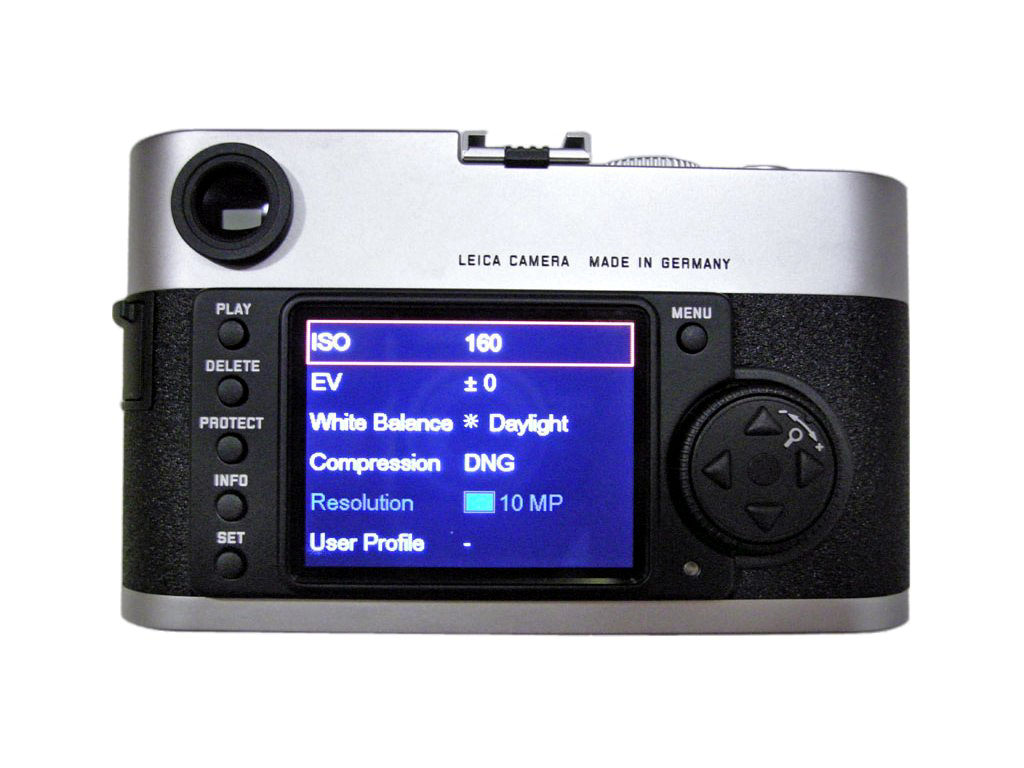
M8 rear view

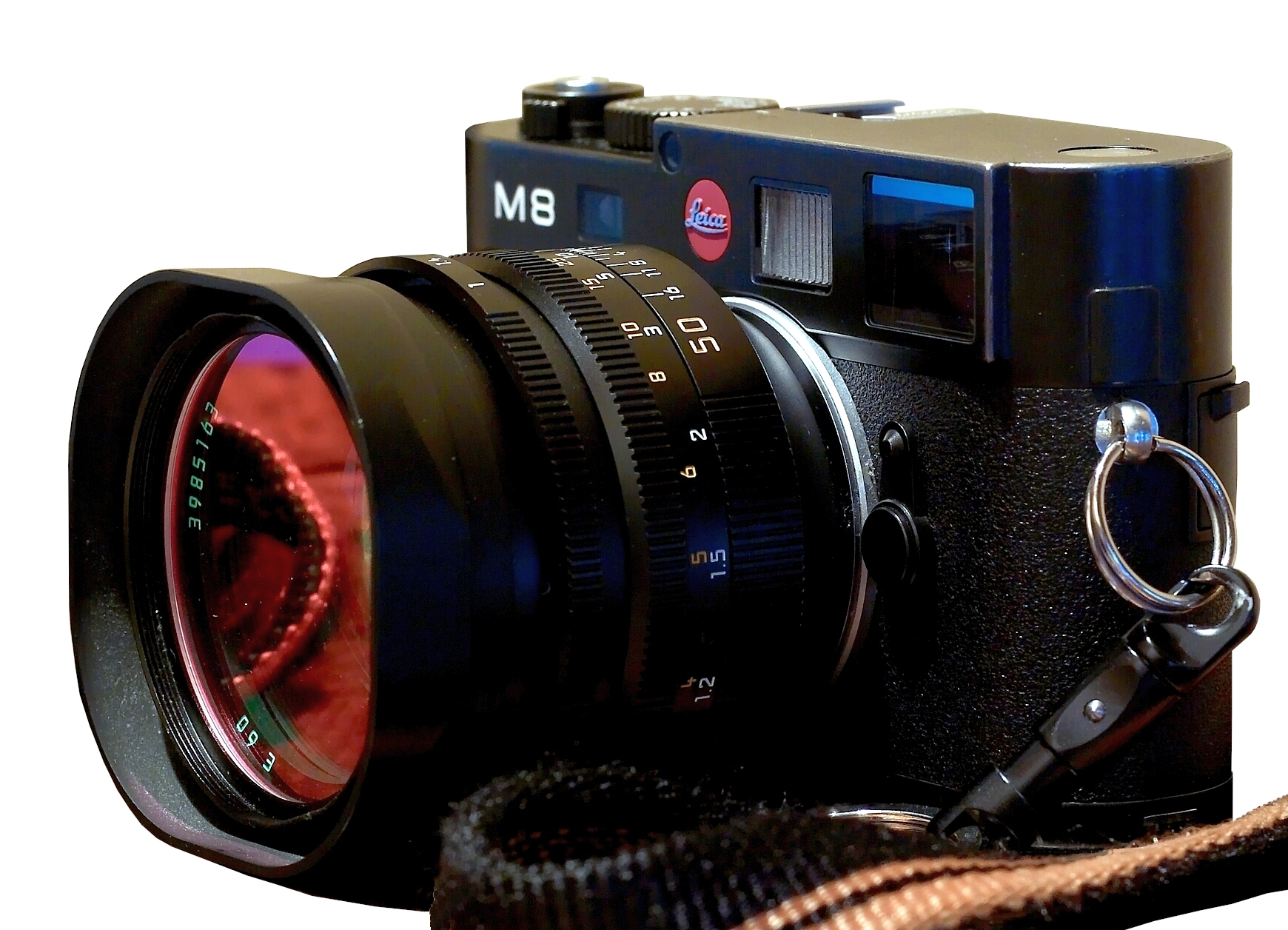
Leica M8 with Noctilux and IR filter

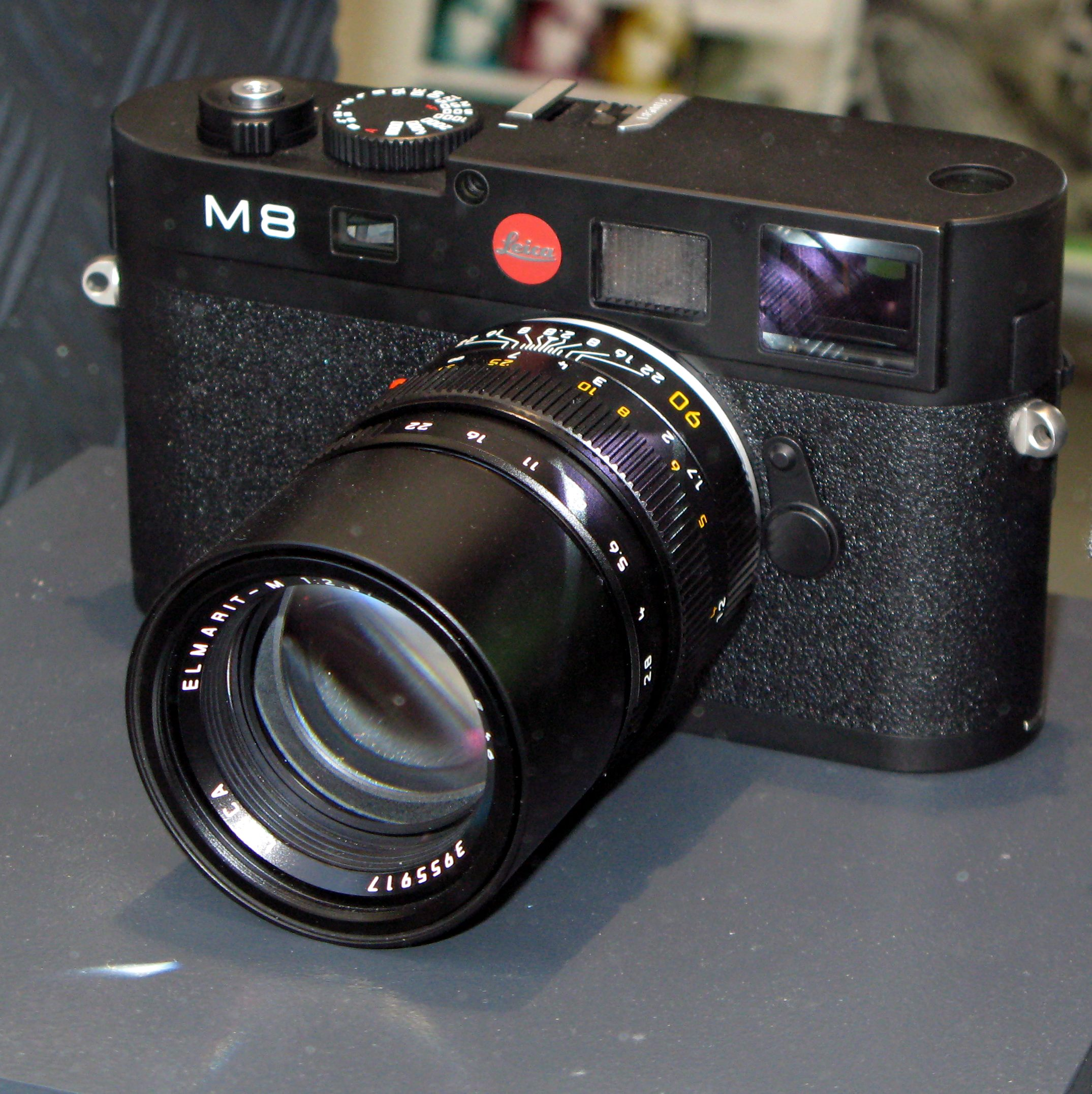
Leica M8 with a 90mm telelens

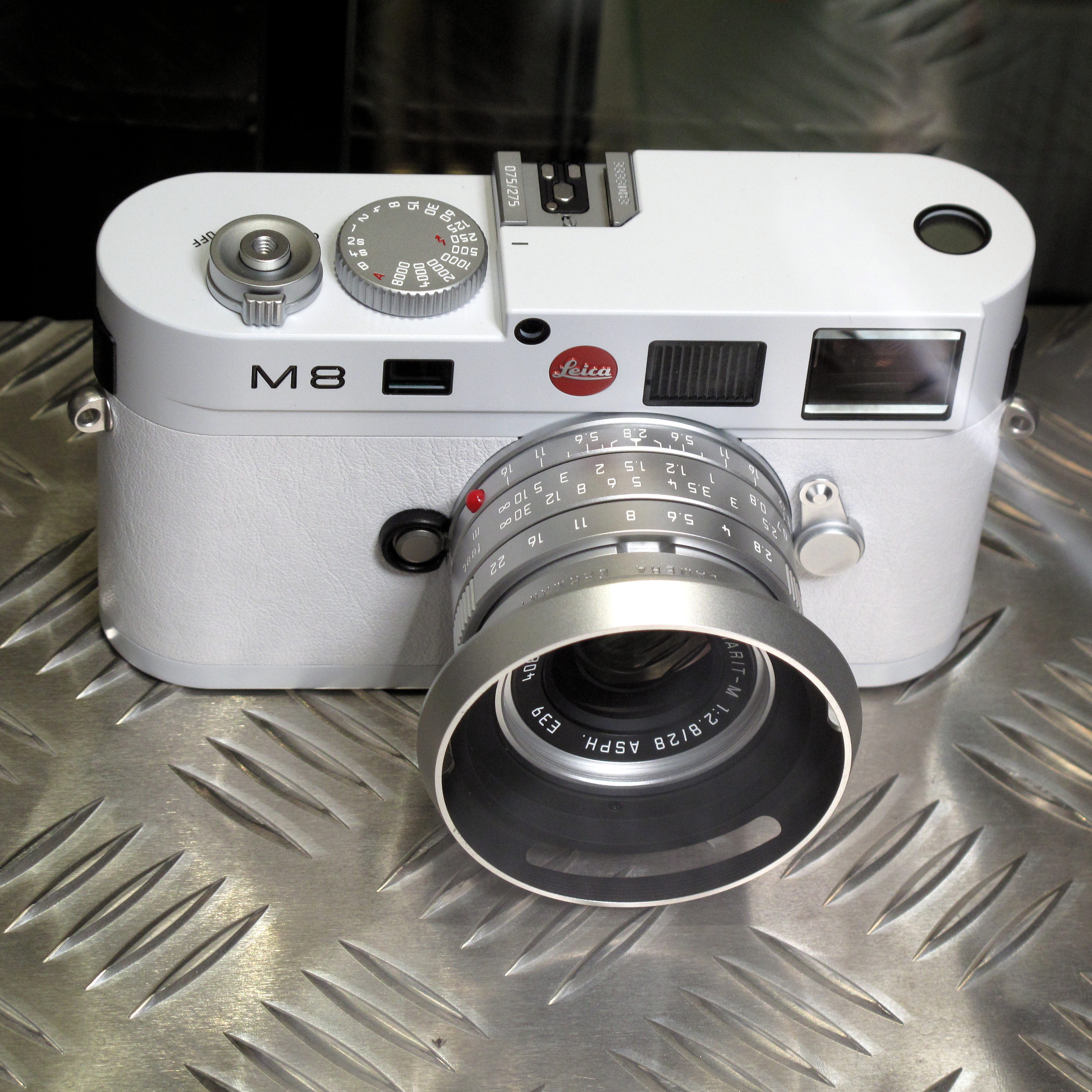
White limited edition

== See also ==
- Leica M7 film rangefinder camera
- List of retro-style digital cameras

Type		2006	2007	2008	2009	2010	2011	2012	2013	2014	2015	2016	2017	2018	2019	2020	2021	2022
Leica	M		M8			M9/ M9-P			M (240)/ M-P (240)				M10/ M10-P					M11
Leica	ME								M-E (220)			M (262)				M-E (240)		
Leica	MM								MM			MM (246)				M10M		
Leica	MD												M-D (262)		M10-D			
Leica	MR																M10-R	
Non-Leica		Epson R-D1 • Zenit M																
