= Neoca 2s =

35mm rangefinder camera

The Neoca 2S is a 35mm rangefinder camera made in Japan in 1955 and 1956. It has a dual-stroke advance lever and a central shutter; neither feature is typical for this kind of camera. The lens is a Neokor anastigmat f=45mm/3.5.

Shutter speeds are B and 1 sec to 1/300s. Depth of field is indicated on the lens barrel. The distance scale is in metres. It has no exposure meter. Users on internet newsgroups report the camera scratches their film.
