= Leica M3 =

1954 35mm rangefinder camera

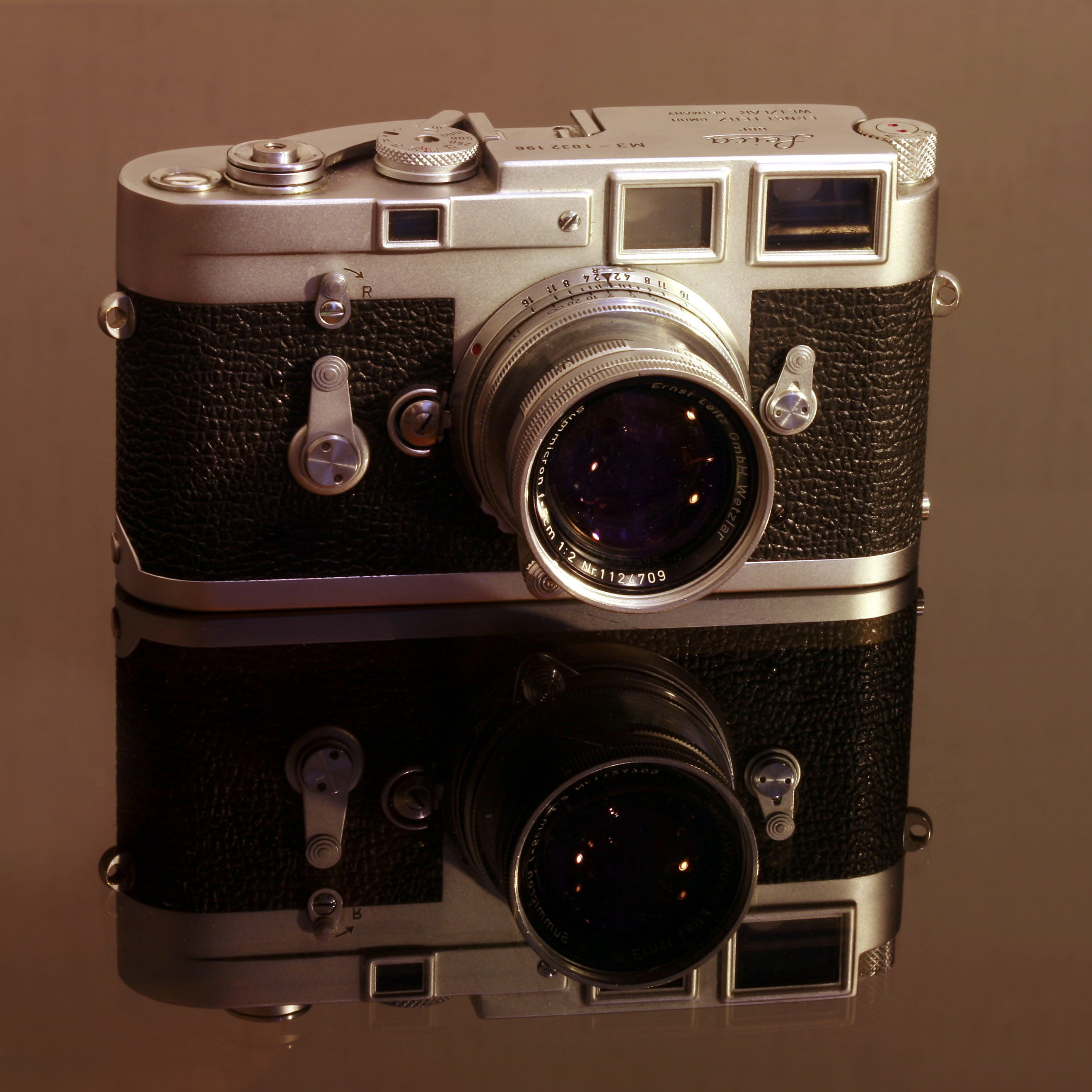
- Single-stroke M3 with collapsible Summicron 50mm f/2.0 lens

Overview
- Maker: Leica Camera
- Type: 35 mm rangefinder camera

Lens
- Lens mount: Leica M-mount

Focusing
- Focus: manual

Exposure/metering
- Exposure: manual

Flash
- Flash: standard accessory shoe with separate bulb and electronic flash connectors

General
- Dimensions: 138×77×33.5 mm (5.43×3.03×1.32 in)
- Weight: 580 g (20 oz)

The Leica M3 is a 35 mm rangefinder camera by Ernst Leitz GmbH (now Leica Camera AG), introduced in 1954. It was a new starting point for Leitz, which until then had only produced screw-mount Leica cameras that were incremental improvements to its original Leica (Ur-Leica). The M3 introduced several features to the Leica, among them the combination of viewfinder and rangefinder in one bright window, like on the Contax II, a bayonet lens mount, and rapid film advance lever. It was the most successful model of the M series, with over 220,000 units sold by the time production of the M3 model ended in 1967.

It was succeeded by a number of later film M series cameras, including the Leica M-A film camera in 2014.

The earliest Leica M3 pre-model that was built, sold at auction in 2009 for €72,000. In June 2019 a pre series model from 1952/1953 was sold for €360.000 at the 34th Leitz auction in Wetzlar.

== Mount ==
This new bayonet mount, which has not been changed in the following half century, is called the Leica M-mount. Lenses are changed faster than with a screw mount, and framelines set automatically. Non-Leitz/Leica bayonet-mount lenses can also be used (although none were produced in any quantity while the M3 was sold), and a simple adapter also allows the use of screwmount lenses (whether from Leitz or other companies).

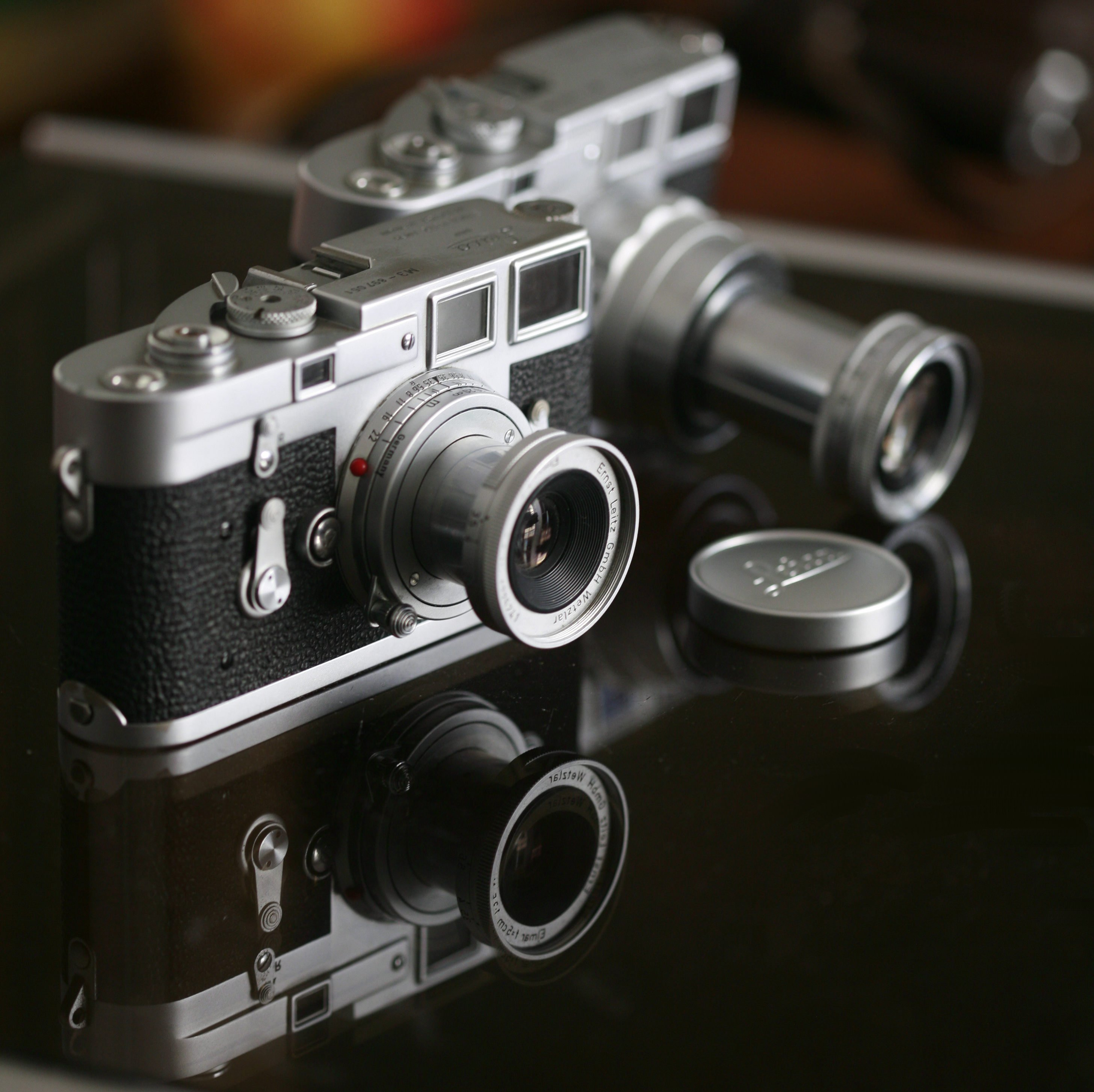
Two M3s fitted with 50mm and 90mm collapsible lenses

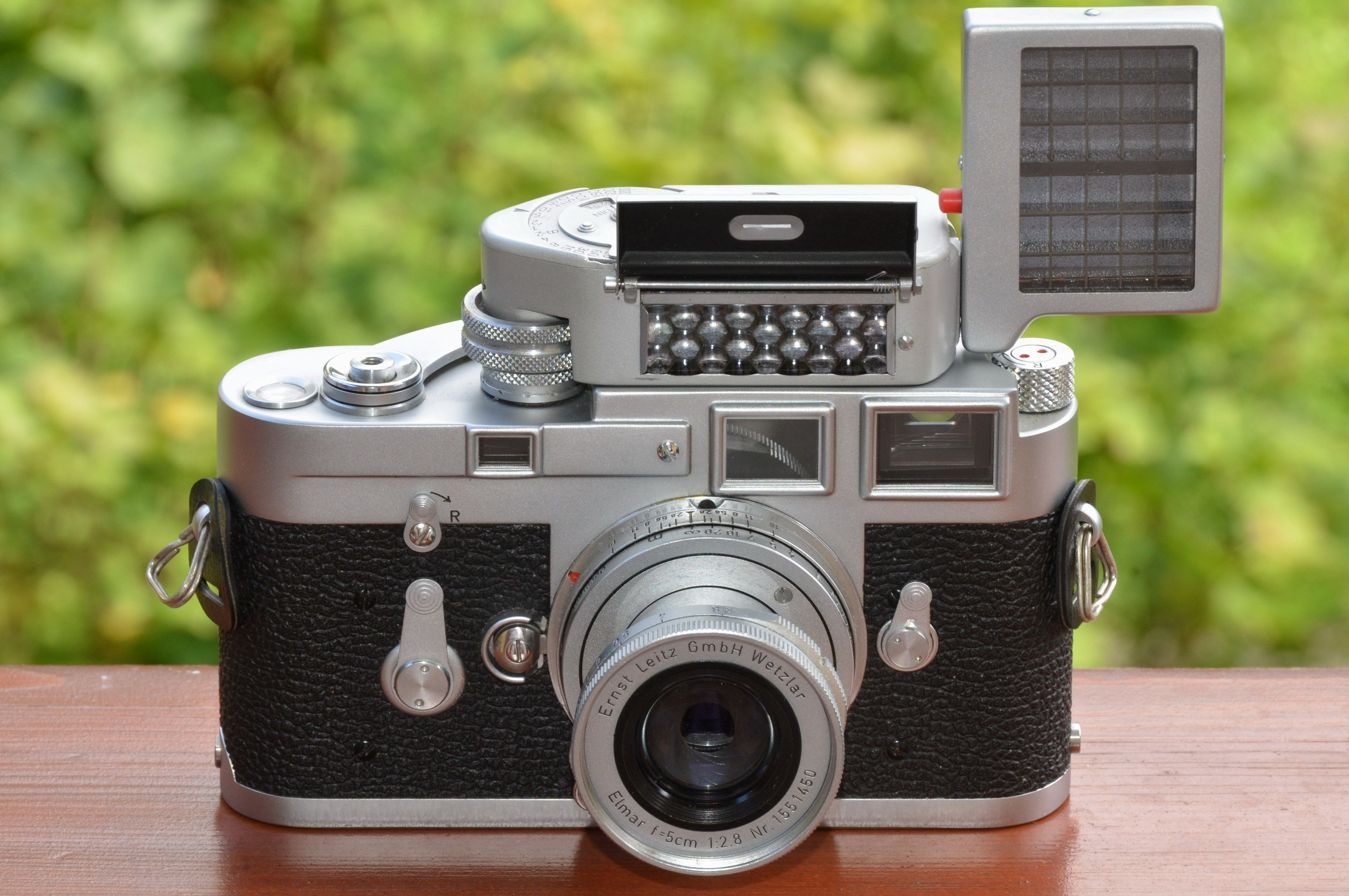
Leica M3 chrome Single-stroke with Leica-Meter M, Booster and collapsible Elmar f=5 cm 1:2,8 M39 lens with M-adapter

== Viewfinder ==
The M3 has an exceptionally bright viewfinder when compared to any previous or subsequent model, including the modern M9. The M3 has a high magnification factor of 0.91×, which is useful in critical focusing, and especially with long lenses (subsequent Leicas would use 0.85×, 0.72×, or 0.58×).

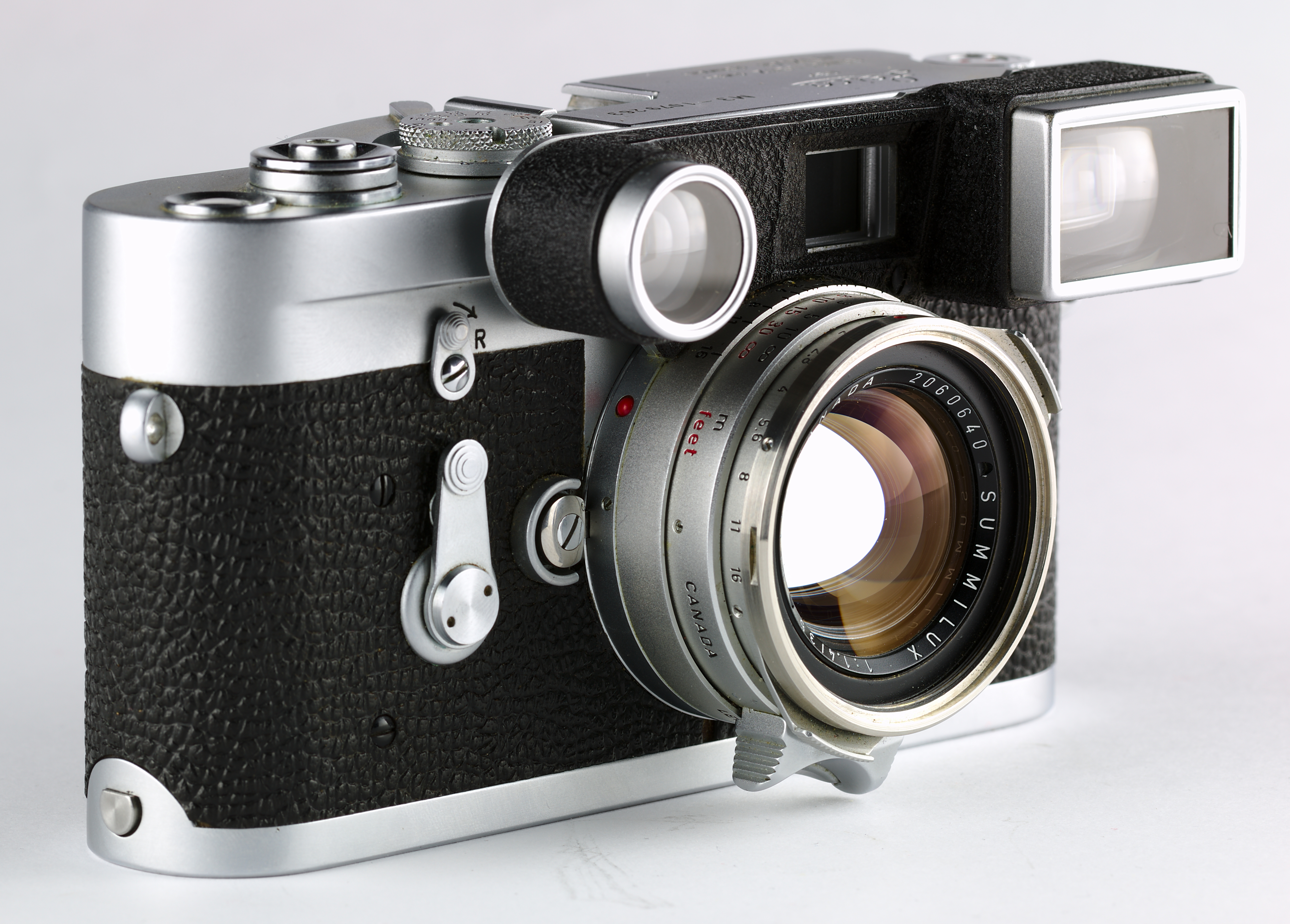
"Leica goggles" of a 35mm lens. They adapt the 50mm base viewfinder to the viewfield of the 35mm.

It was the first Leica to combine rangefinder and viewfinder into one window. (Other cameras, such as the Contax II, already had this feature before World War II; and other companies were making screwmount bodies with combined finders.) Framelines for 50, 90 and 135mm are shown, although none for any wider lenses. However, Leica solved this problem in two different ways:

- a separate viewfinder slid into the accessory shoe.
- the so-called Leica "Specs" or "glasses": These auxiliary lenses/prisms are put in front of the viewfinder and rangefinder windows for the 35mm focal length. The drawback of this attachment is that they reduce the famous brightness of the viewfinder.
- The Dual Range Summicron f/2 lens came with an auxiliary fitting similar to that of the 35mm "specs" attachment with a lens & prism to fit over the view and focus windows. It was used when the camera to subject distance was from the near range minimum of about 18 inches (0.45 meters) to the maximum of 36 inches (0.9 meters). These auxiliary "specs" were removed when focusing in the regular range beyond 36 inches. The Summicron lens could not turn to the near range settings unless the auxiliary "specs" were fitted in place on the lens.

The 50 mm framelines are always visible. The viewfinder image is slightly larger. There are two ways to select the 90mm or 135mm framelines:

- putting a 90mm lens on the camera will automatically select the corresponding framelines
- toggling a small lever on the left of the lens. This way, one can see the tele-framelines when using a 50mm lens. It helps visualise the field of view for another focal length. (Earlier versions did not have a lever to view the 90mm frameline without attaching the lens.)
50 mm

90 mm

135 mm

Viewfinder cameras do not show exactly the same image in the viewfinder and on the film, due to the distance of the viewfinder to the view axis of the lens. This parallax problem is compensated in the M3 by moving the framelines when the lens is focused. This full parallax compensation is limited to one metre; closer distances require special "Leica glasses" as described above.

== Film transport ==
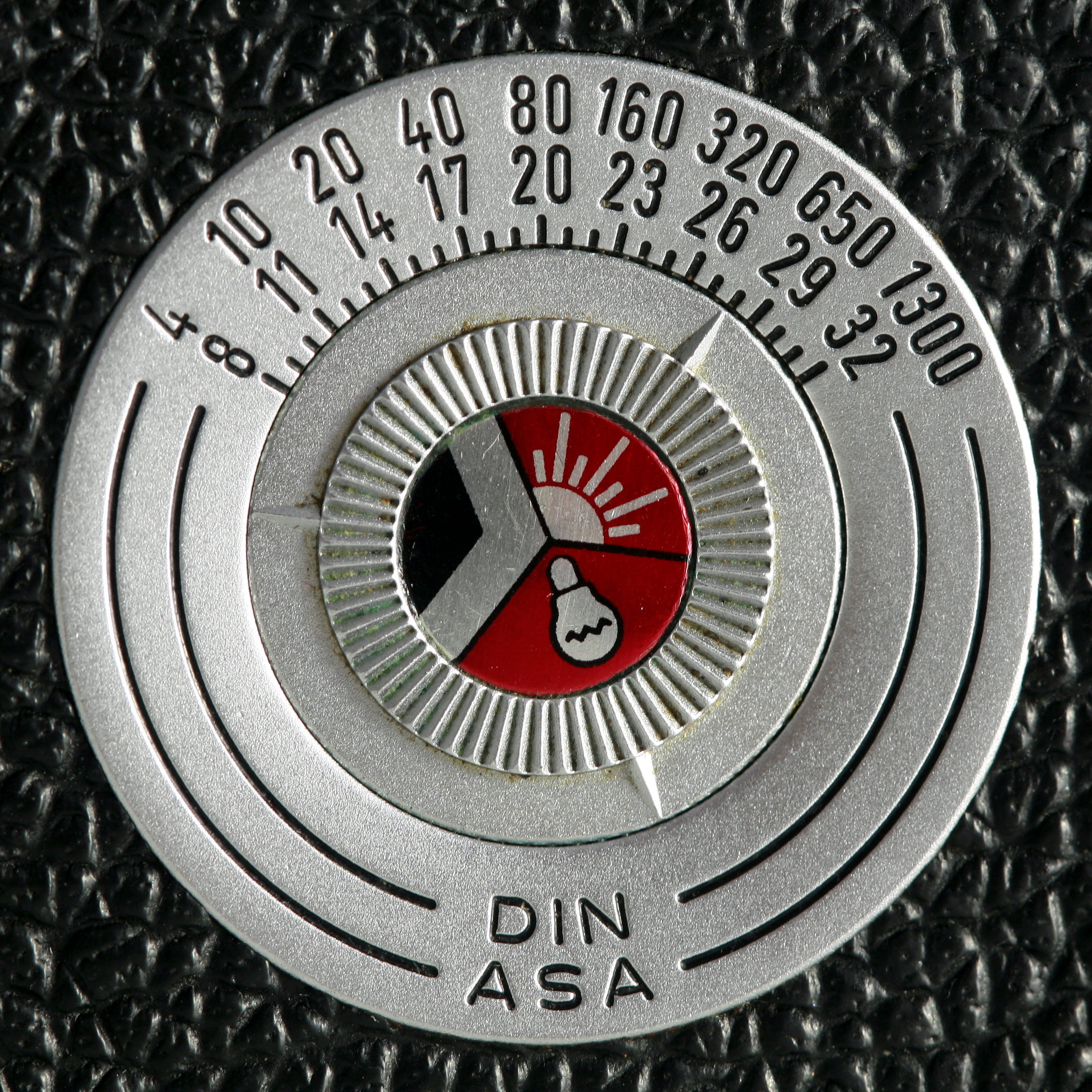
Film type indicator on the rear of the body

The Leica IIIf and its predecessors had used a knob to advance the film. For fear of tearing the film, early M3s had a double stroke advance lever, like the Neoca 2s would. Later models (from model no 919 251) had single-stroke levers, which quickened up operation of the camera. Another type of variation is in the film pressure plate used. Early models used a glass plate to keep the film flat, whereas later models used a metal plate.

Loading of the film is done by removing the bottom plate, like on the Leica II and III series. A door flap on the rear of the camera can be raised, allowing for easier access to the film, thereby overcoming a problem associated with these earlier screw-lens-type Leicas. The film is inserted from the bottom of the camera after the user has pre-attached the leading end to the take-up spool. Special cassettes were also available.

== Shutter ==
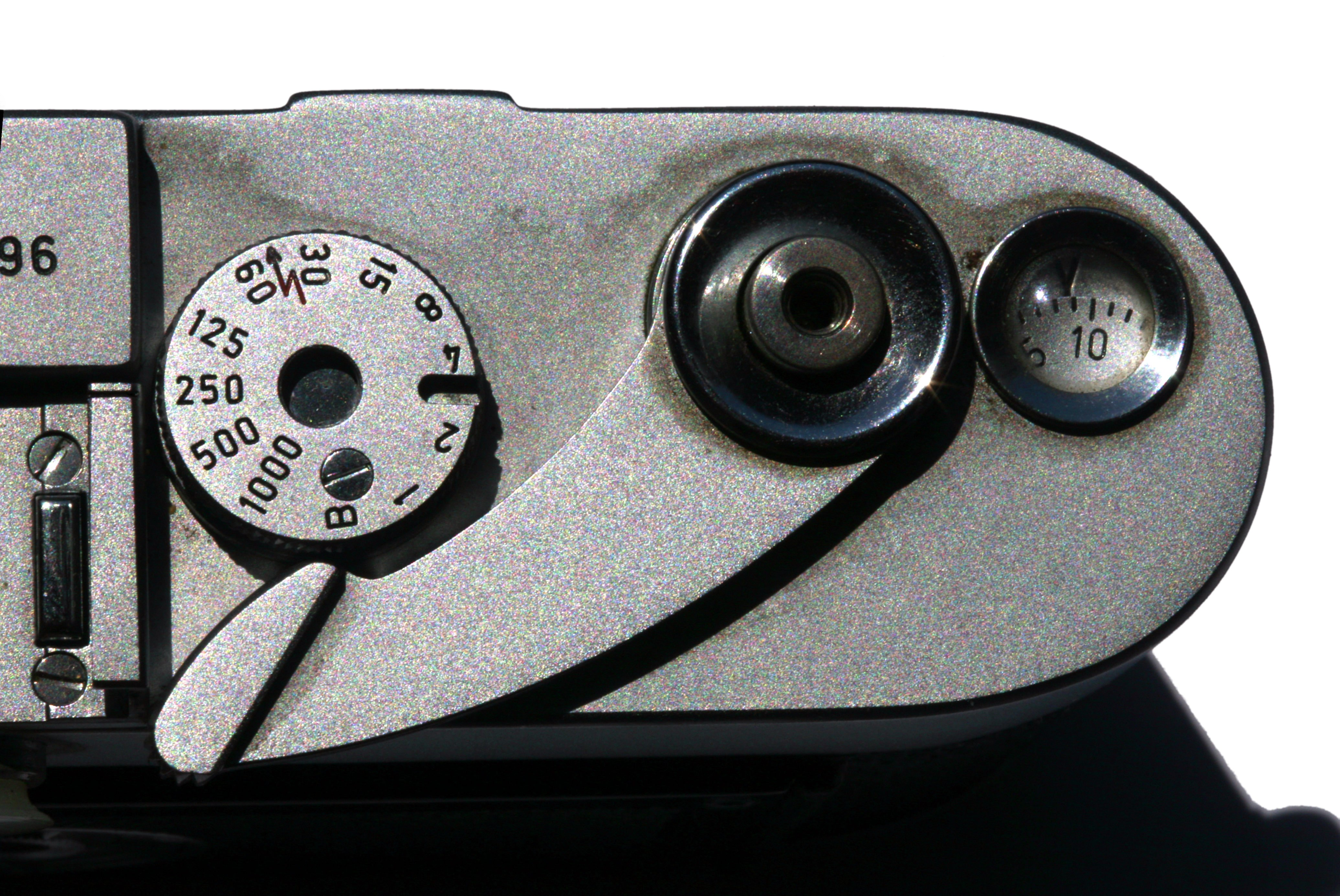
Speed shutter dial, advance lever with shutter button, and frame counter.

Previous screw mount Leicas used two separate shutter speed dials for slow and fast speeds (the fast speed dial on top of the camera rotated during firing). The M3 combined slower and faster speeds and the dial does not rotate during firing. Supposedly, this reduces vibrations in the camera. Early models used a non-geometrical series of shutter speeds. On later models this became the international standard of 1s to 1/1000s. It is possible to set the camera to any intermediate speed between 1 second and 1/8 and between 1/15 and 1/30 as well as between 1/50 and 1/1000 of a second. It is not possible to use intermediate speeds between 1/8 and 1/15 or 1/30 and 1/50 because each full stop utilises a different gearing mechanism.

== Variants and successors ==
Variants of the M3 were made for specific purposes. The Leica 24x27 was a camera with neither rangefinder nor viewfinder, made for the postal service to photograph electricity meters.

The M3 was supplemented by the M2 with a 0.72× viewfinder more suited to wide-angle lenses. The next model was the rangefinder-less M1, intended as an interface with scientific instruments or with a visoflex. With the exception of the larger Leica M5, subsequent Leica M-series cameras have a strong family resemblance to the M3.

In 2002, a miniature replica camera, the Digital Classic Camera Leica M3, was made by Minox (by then bought by Leica).

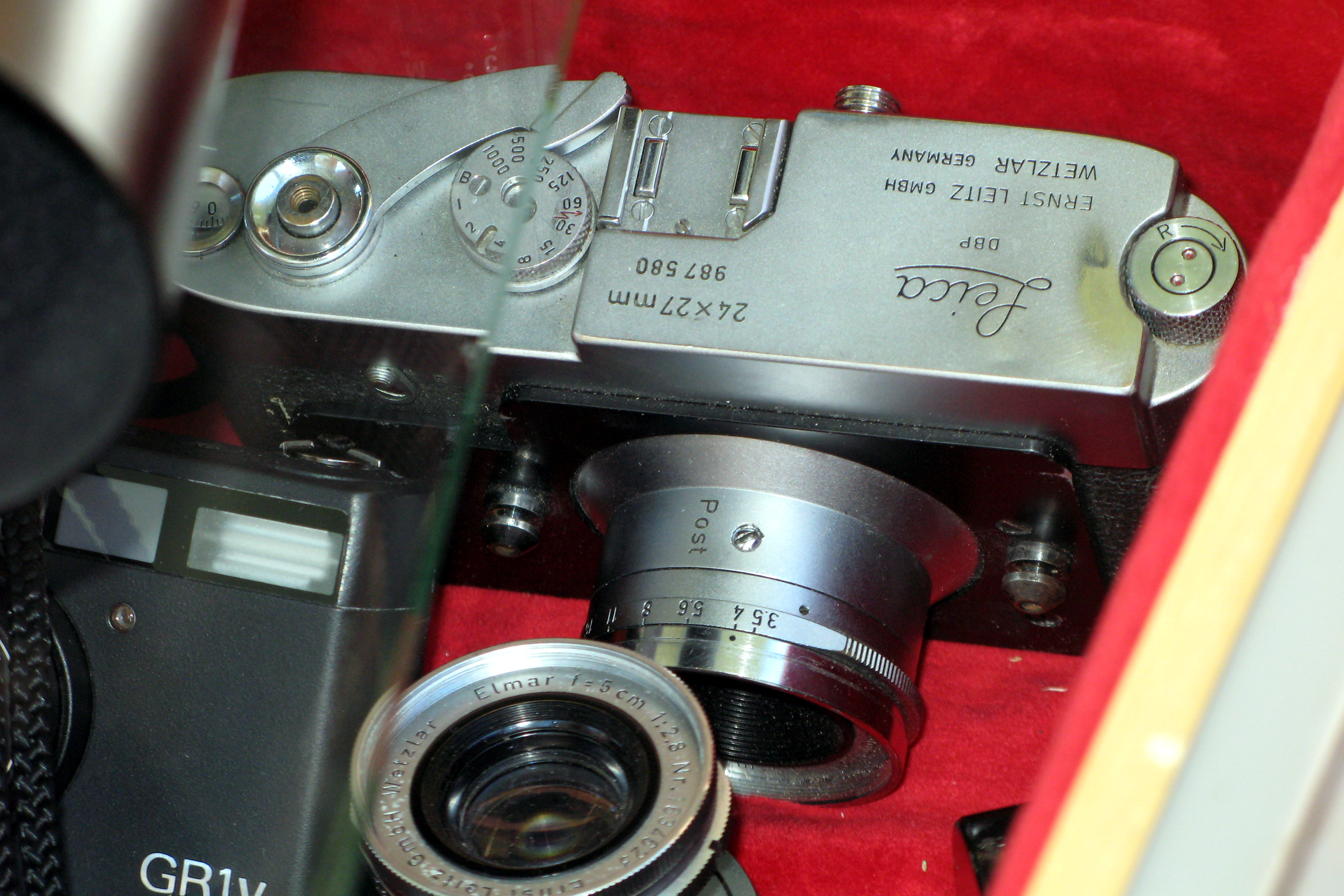
Leica 24x27

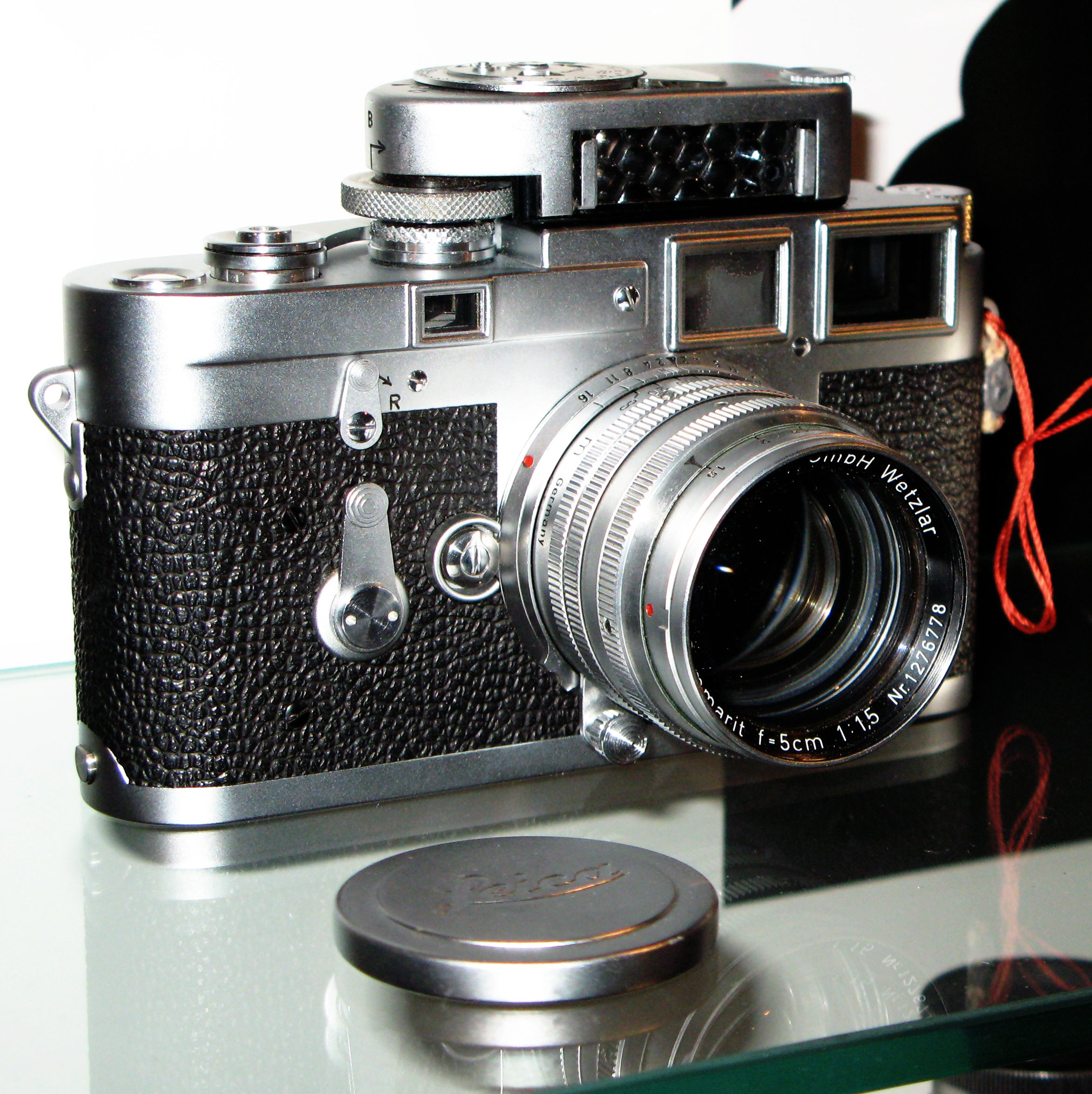
Leica M3 fitted with a Selenium meter

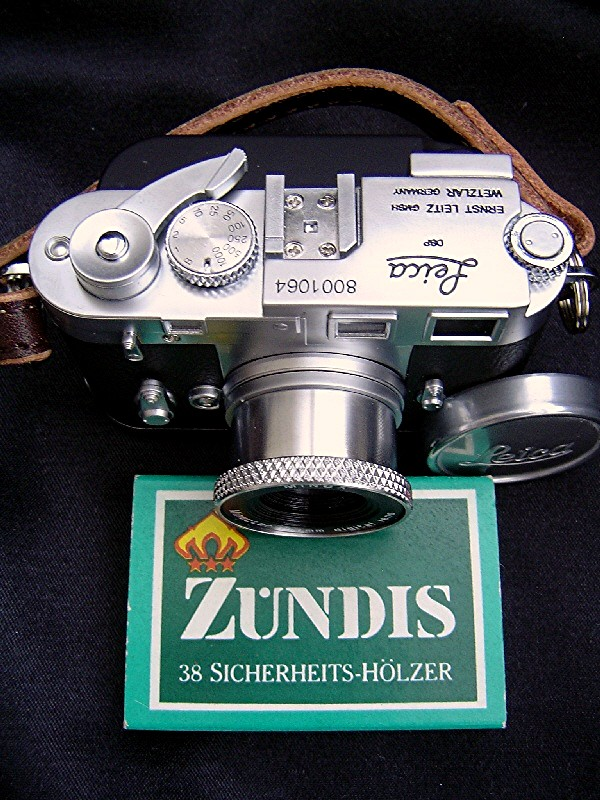
Modern Digital Classic Camera Leica M3, a miniature digital clone of the Leica M3 by Minox

Type	1950s										1960s										1970s										1980s										1990s										2000s										2010s										2020s									
Type	50	51	52	53	54	55	56	57	58	59	60	61	62	63	64	65	66	67	68	69	70	71	72	73	74	75	76	77	78	79	80	81	82	83	84	85	86	87	88	89	90	91	92	93	94	95	96	97	98	99	00	01	02	03	04	05	06	07	08	09	10	11	12	13	14	15	16	17	18	19	20	21	22	23	24	25	26	27	28	29
Leica					M3																																																																											
Leica								M2																																																																								
Leica																	M4							M4		M4-2				M4-P			M6															M6 TTL						MP																										
Leica																						M5																															M7																				M6							
Leica										M1														Leica CL																																									M-A (127)															
Non-Leica	Konica Hexar RF • 35mm Bessa • Cosina Voigtländer • Minolta CLE • Rollei 35 RF • Zeiss Ikon																																																																															
