= Canon P =

35mm rangefinder camera

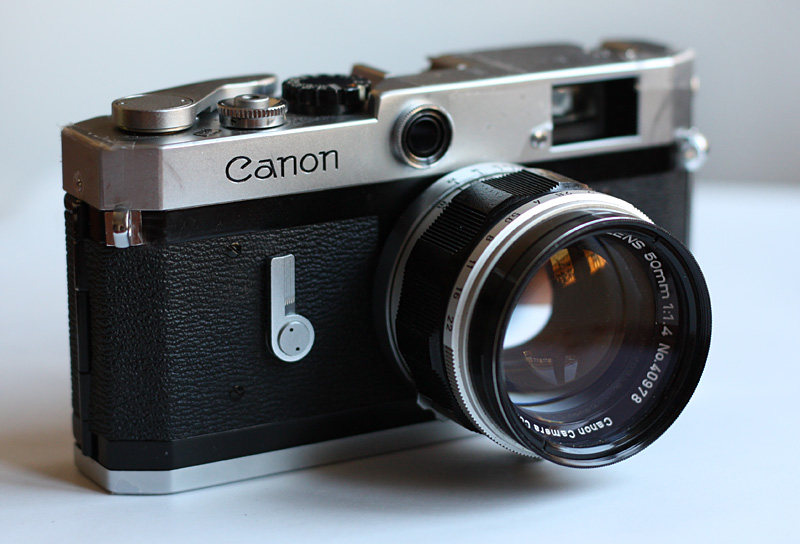

Overview
- Maker: Canon
- Type: 35 mm rangefinder camera
- Released: March 1959
- Production: 1959-1961

Lens
- Lens mount: Leica M39 screw mount

Sensor/medium
- Recording medium: 135 film

Focusing
- Focus: manual

Exposure/metering
- Exposure: manual

Flash
- Flash: External cold shoe

General
- Dimensions: 144 mm x 76mm x 30 mm

The Canon P (P for Populaire) was a rangefinder camera produced by Canon Inc., compatible with the Leica M39 screw mount (LTM). It was introduced in March 1959, alongside an all-black version, and was marketed as a low-cost sister to the Canon VI-L. The Canon P is the predecessor to the Canon 7 rangefinder.
