= Kodak 35 =

35mm camera from Kodak

Kodak 35 c.1938
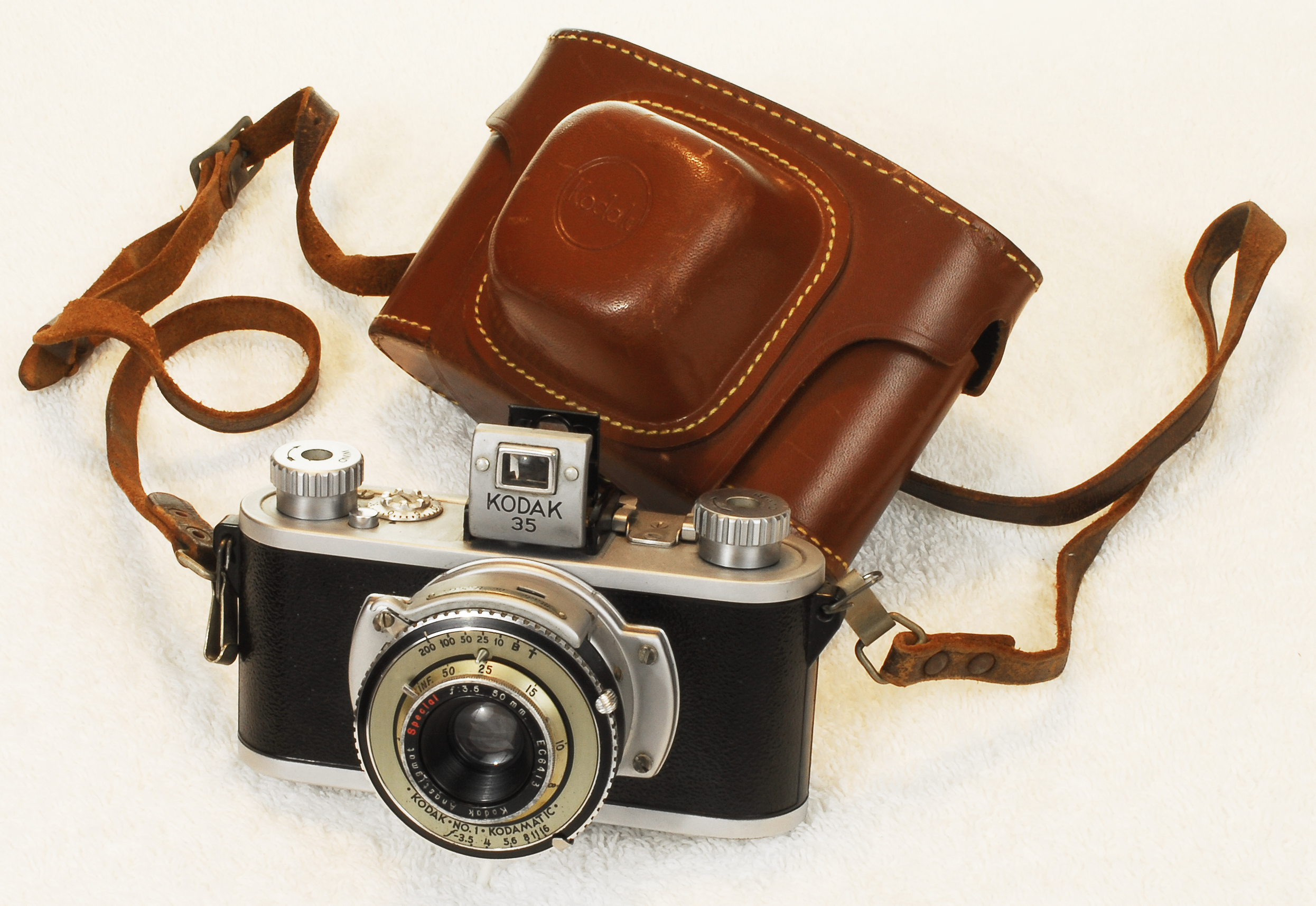

Overview
- Type: 35mm

Focusing
- Focus: front element

Exposure/metering
- Exposure: 35mm format (24×36 mm) on 135 film

The Kodak 35 was introduced in 1938 as the first US manufactured 35 mm camera from Eastman Kodak Company. It was developed in Rochester, New York, when it became likely that imports from the Kodak AG factory in Germany could be disrupted by war.

While Kodak had invented the Kodak 135 daylight-loading film cassette in 1934, prior to 1938 they only offered the German made Kodak Retina to work with this cartridge. US-built 35 mm cameras used the 828 paper backed 35 mm roll-film (Bantam Series).

== The original viewfinder model ==
The first Kodak 35 had no rangefinder. It slightly resembles cameras like the German Wirgin Edinex and Adox Adrette. It takes thirty-six 24×36 mm frames on 135 film. The precision molded black Bakelite body has satin-chromed top and base plates, and a collapsible finder is mounted on top center. The removable Bakelite back with the attached base plate slides easily off for film handling. It is secured by a centrally located wing key in the base plate. Turning the key also slackens the spring tension of the chromed steel film pressure plate, a very unusual feature presumably incorporated to facilitate reassembling the camera rather than preventing scratching the film during rewind, which would have been a novel feature.

Prominently placed at the top are the large wind-on and rewind knobs, the right-hand one is the film advance knob, both to be operated in the clockwise direction. Next to it is a manually reset automatic frame counter dial and the chromed wind-on release button, the latter not to be mistaken for the shutter release. The front element focusing Kodak lens has a rigid lensmount set in a Kodak inter-lens shutter. The shutter is cocked by a gear coupling to the sprocket-wheel drum, which is trailing along with the passing film during the wind-on operation. Hence, there is no shutter cocking without a film in the camera. An automatic mechanism locates the next frame on the film by locking the advance knob. It is released for the next frame by depressing the wind-on release button before turning the wind-on knob. This prevents double exposure, but not blank frames since nothing prevents pressing the button again and advance the film. However, a red indicator is shown to the left in a slot on the top of the shutter cover that indicates the camera has been wound. The shutter release, in the shape of a rearward-pointing pin attached to the shutter release lever, is situated at about 10-o'clock at the shutter housing. It is protected from being accidentally triggered by a small cover extending over it.

Rewinding the film into its cassette is accomplished by first pulling the wind-on knob to its raised position followed by turning the left-hand top mounted rewind-knob clock-wise; this is accompanied by a rattling noise. It is not possible to raise the wind-on knob if it is not free to rotate, it is freed by turning the knob clock-wise while depressing the double exposure prevention button. The frame counter dial rotates during rewind as long as the film passes the sprocket wheel drum. The wind gears, which is visible inside the machined steel film chamber. All internal metal parts are either plated steel or brass. The film pressure-plate is chrome-plated polished steel, while the other parts are nickel-plated.

A variety of lens and shutter combinations appeared during the production period:

- 1938–1945: Kodak Anastigmat f/5.6 50mm in KODEX SHUTTER, or
- 1938–1949: Kodak Anastigmat Special f/3.5 50mm in KODAMATIC SHUTTER, or
- 1946–1947: Kodak Anastigmat f/4.5 50mm in FLASH DIOMATIC SHUTTER,
- 1947–1948: Kodak Anastigmat Special f/3.5 51mm in FLASH KODAMATIC SHUTTER, or
- 1947–1948: Kodak Anaston f/4.5 50mm in FLASH DIOMATIC SHUTTER.

== The improved model with rangefinder ==
After some two years, the Eastman Kodak Company presented an improved Kodak 35 camera, known as the Kodak 35 Rangefinder, with a new superstructure housing a viewfinder and a separate rangefinder, but without any addition to the identifying inscription on the body. It is generally referred to as the "RF model".

== Variations in finish and specifications ==
Several finishes appeared during the production run. The body is black Bakelite and top and base is chromed metal. When first introduced the collapsible viewfinder on top of the camera was black and the knobs on top of the camera were black Bakelite, while the military viewfinder camera were olive drab with blackened metal parts. There were no civil production between 1942 and 1945. The post-war viewfinder and the rangefinder models were also black with bright-chromed metal features, and an accessory shoe was added to the viewfinder model next to the rewind knob. However, for a while during the period from 1947 to 1949, the knobs were also made of white plastic instead of metal. Both the metal- and the white rewind knobs have a film reminder dial in the hub.

A few minor modifications were also made to internal parts, notably to the film pressure plate spring that changes through a variety of shapes from rod to flat shape. Most, if not all shutters alternatives have a No. 5 Cable Release socket with a tiny removable coin-slotted screw plug, while the later ones also have a Kodak type flash synchroniser contact post. A metal band inscribed "Made in U.S.A." was attached to the top of the shutter housing cover plate, save for the last year or two of production. The milling pattern on the focusing wheel front goes through a variety of styles from flat to a pattern of several concentric circles.

The Kodak 35 came with a hard brown leather ever-ready case.
