= Pixii =

Pixii can refer to the following:

- Hippolyte Pixii (1808–1835), French maker of scientific instruments
  - Pixii machine, the first commutated dynamo invented by Hippolyte Pixii
- Pixii (cameras), rangefinder camera line produced by homonymous French startup
