= Petri Camera =

Japanese optics and film cameras company

Petri Camera Company
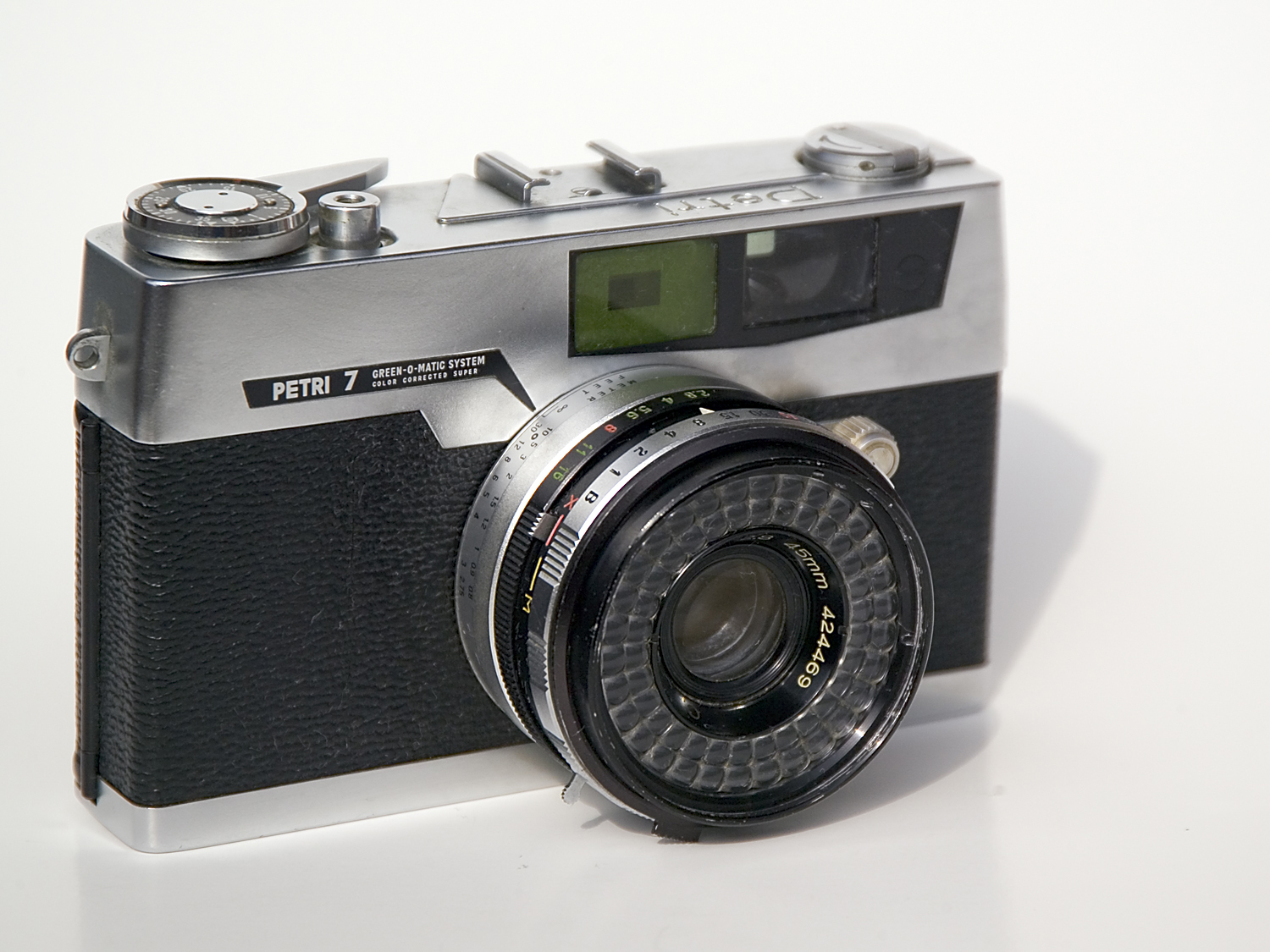
- Petri 7 came in many varieties.
- Native name: ペトリ
- Romanized name: Petri Camera Ltd
- Formerly: Kuribayashi Shashin Kōgyō (1907–1961)
- Company type: Public

The Petri F1.9 rangefinder with 45mm f1.9 lens

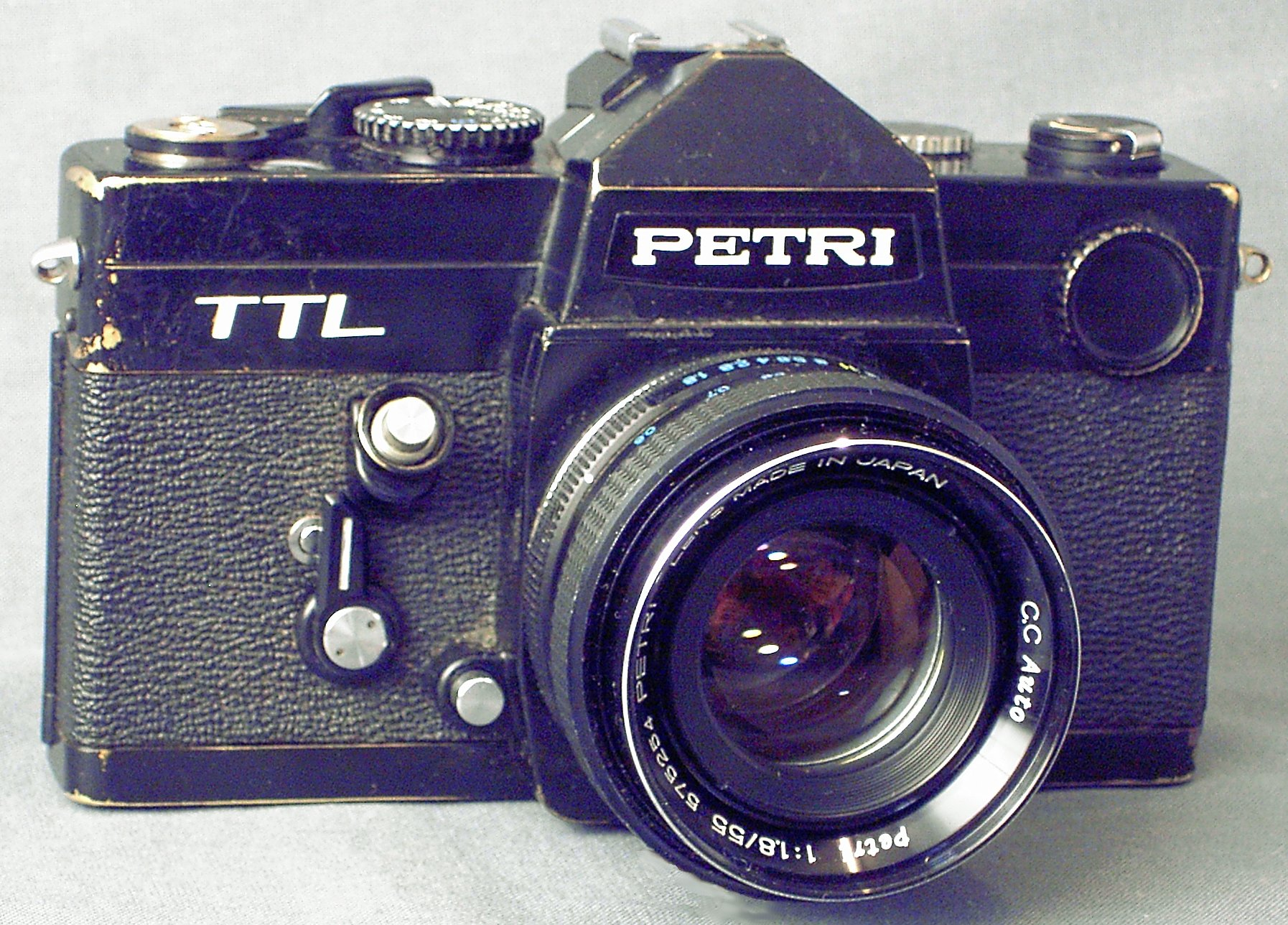
Petri TTL 135 film SLR camera

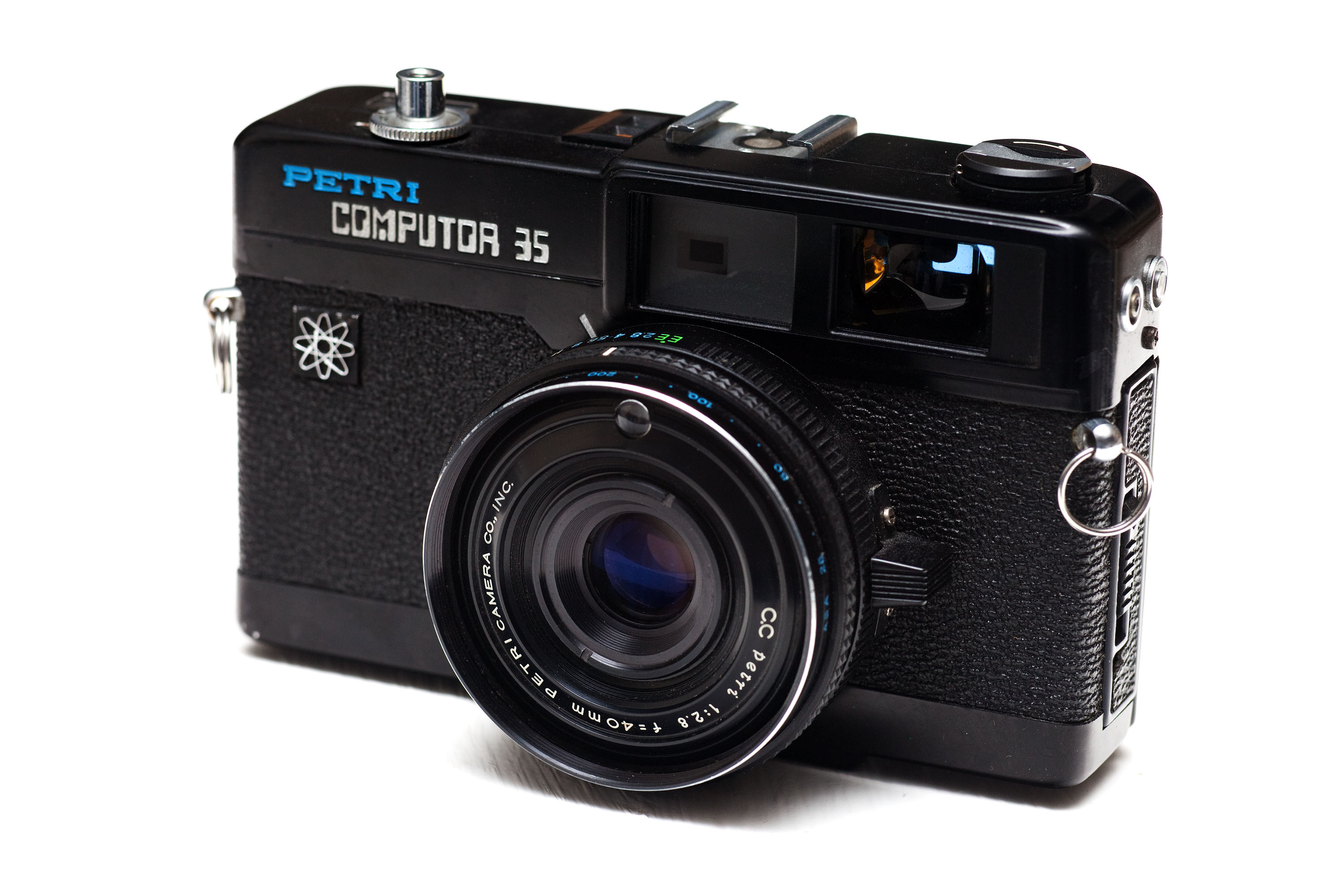
Petri Computor 35

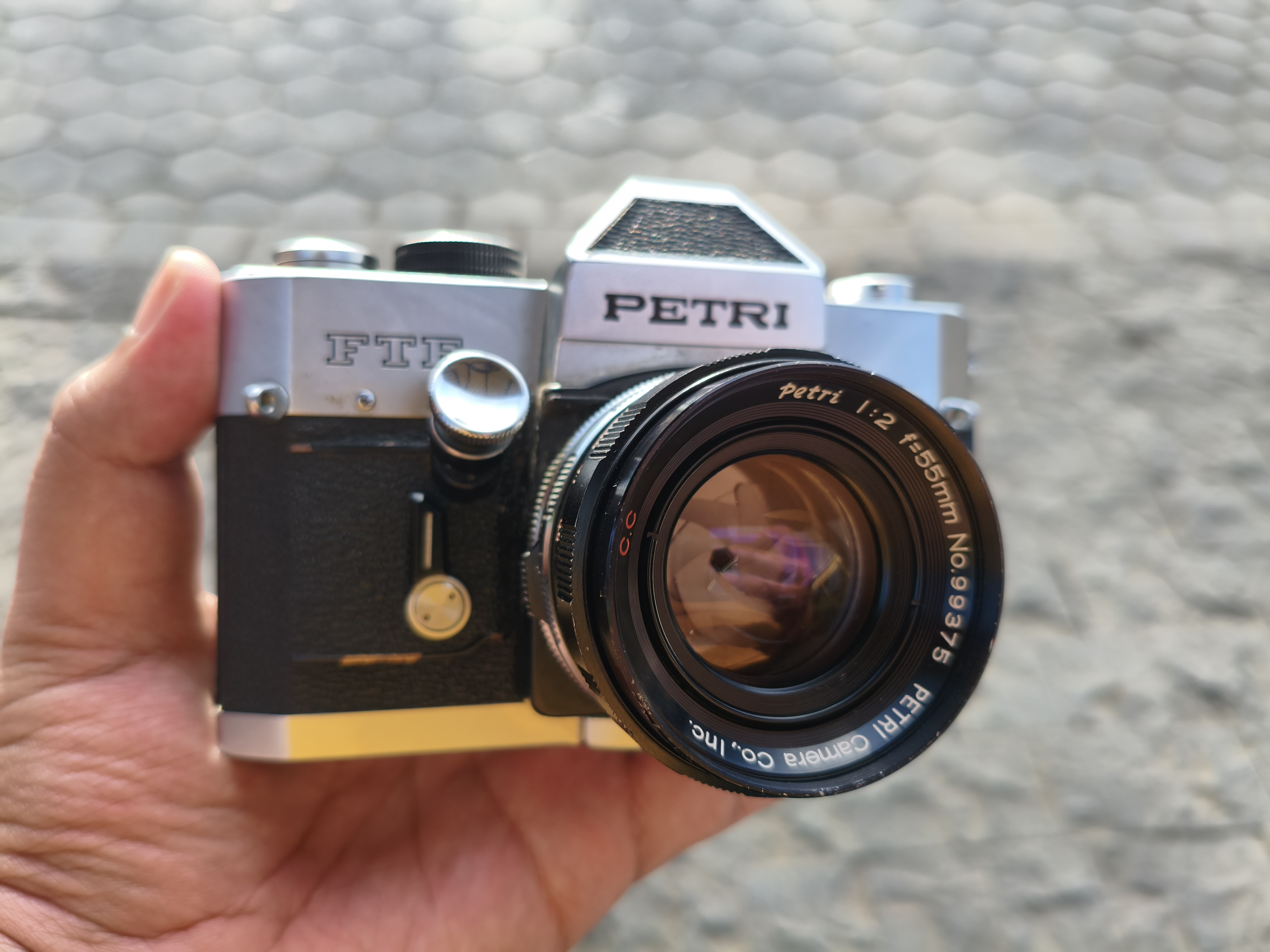
Petri FTE 35mm SLR camera

The Petri (ペトリ) Camera Company was an optical company and manufacturer of cameras in Japan. It was founded in 1907. Prior to World War II, it was known as Kuribayashi Shashin Kōgyō or Kuribayashi Camera Industry, inc. Japan (the company name means "Chestnut Grove"). In 1962 it changed its name to Petri Camera Ltd. In 1963 the company produced the cult model, the Petri 7S Circle-Eye System coupled rangefinder, leaf-shuttered model, which was used by some professionals in the 1960s, and which was so well built that it is still used today, particularly by street photography enthusiasts. This was followed by the very successful Petri 7S 11 in 1966. Both models had colour-corrected lenses.

== History ==
The first Petri SLR was the "Penta" (1959). After the first model, the original product line cameras were named Penta for the domestic Japanese market and PetriFlex for export. The original Penta came with a 'universal' M42 screw type mount, while most subsequent models in the Penta, Flex and FT lines used the proprietary Petri breech lock bayonet. Adapters were manufactured to allow interchangeability, albeit with some loss of function. A very limited range of lenses was produced. They returned to the M42 mount in 1974 with the Petri FTX body, continuing to use it on low cost bodies such as the FT1000/500 and the compact MFT1000 and Micro MF-1 bodies.

For the pictured Petri 7 1.8 the company offered a kit that included a front adapter lens marked AUX TELEPHOTO which screws onto the primary lens; a similar lens for WIDE ANGLE is in the kit. The kit includes an optical view finder, TELE-WIDE FINDER, which attaches on the flash shoe and contains two optically marked frames showing telephoto and wide angle. This kit works on the Petri 7 1.9 and the Petri 7 1.8 camera. The single primary lens diaphragm works with these adapted lens mounted on the front, a lower cost design than lenses that include all the back glass and diaphragm with each lens. The camera with primary lens is 13 cm wide, 8 cm tall and 7 cm deep, All these lens have 3.5 cm screw rings. Metering is powered by a ring photocell so no battery is required. Focus is manual on primary lens/viewfinder so the photographer must match the yellow/tinted image with the clear one in the primary viewfinder, then shift the eye to the auxiliary viewfinder to frame the picture when an auxiliary lens is used. 1.8 Camera weighs 710 grams (1 lb 9 oz).

Petri produced many early bellows, rangefinder and single-lens reflex cameras. Due to increased electronization, mass production and competition from other camera vendors, Kuribayashi filed for final bankruptcy in 1977. The labor union, affiliated with Sohyo, continued the company under the name Petri Kōgyō K.K. with employee capital. The last model produced was the MF10, but with its screw-mount lens it could not compete with products having electrical contacts, and disappeared in the autofocus boom of the 1980s. The Petri Camera brand was sold to the Dixons Group in the UK and became an "in-house" brand for a short time in the early eighties.

Now out of the camera business, Petri Kōgyō manufactures telescopes at a plant in the town of Sugito, Saitama Prefecture.
