= Foca camera =

French-made rangefinder cameras

Foca
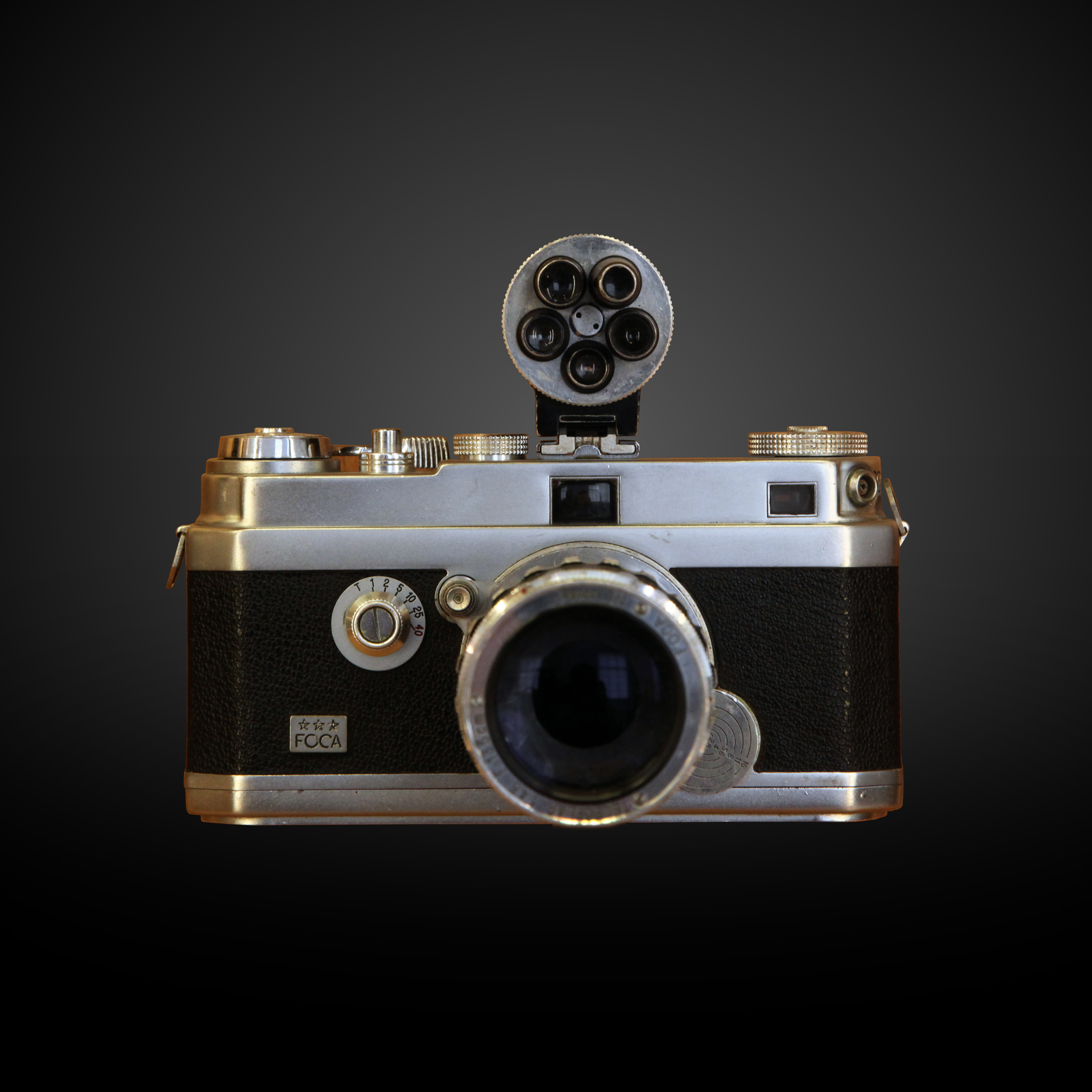

Overview
- Type: 35 mm rangefinder camera

Lens
- Lens mount: 36mm screw mount

Focusing
- Focus: manual

Exposure/metering
- Exposure: manual

Flash
- Flash: standard accessory shoe

The Foca camera was a French-built brand of rangefinder cameras made by Optique & Précision de Levallois.

The camera was designed in 1938, but the Second World War prevented its release, which finally occurred in 1945. The first Foca models were named "PF" (for petit format, "small format") and distinguished by the number of stars. They had focal plane shutter and interchangeable lenses on a screw mounting. The "PF1" (one star), later named "Standard", was the basic version without rangefinder. After 1949, the company developed a bayonet mount version, called "Universel", with a series of lenses all coupled to the rangefinder. Optique & Précision de Levallois (in short OPL) made its own lenses under the brand "Oplar" and derivatives ("Oplarex", "Oplex"...).

Like the Contax II, the Foca had the rangefinder integrated in the viewfinder. In 1961, the viewfinder became wider (magnification 1:1), collimated and corrected from parallax.

The company also made 35 mm models for amateur market:

- "Focasport": viewfinder cameras which were rather popular in France. The rangefinder versions were numbered II.
- "Focaflex": SLR cameras of special design using a leaf shutter.

The production ceased in 1965.

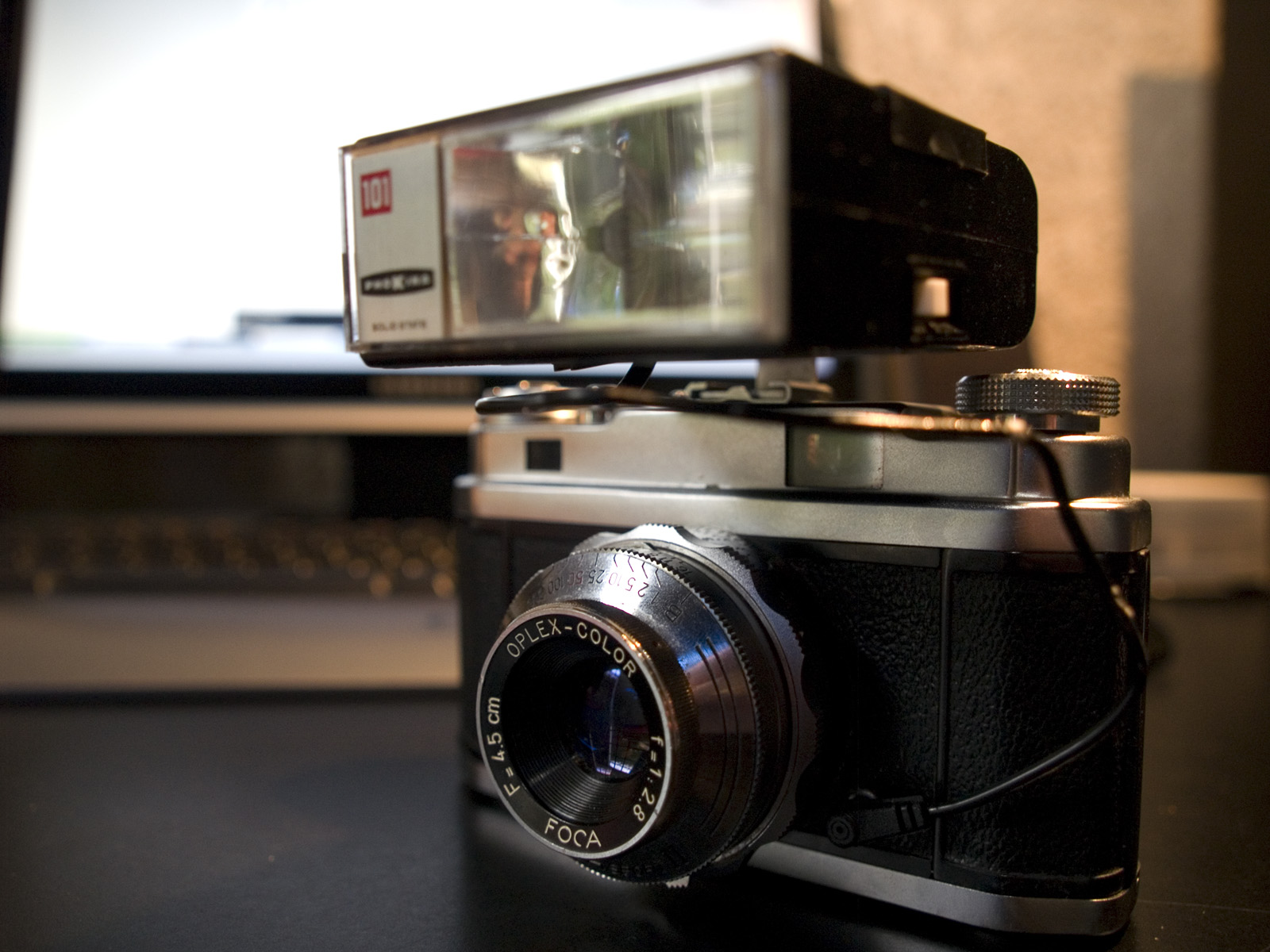
A Focasport II with a flash
