= Petri TTL =

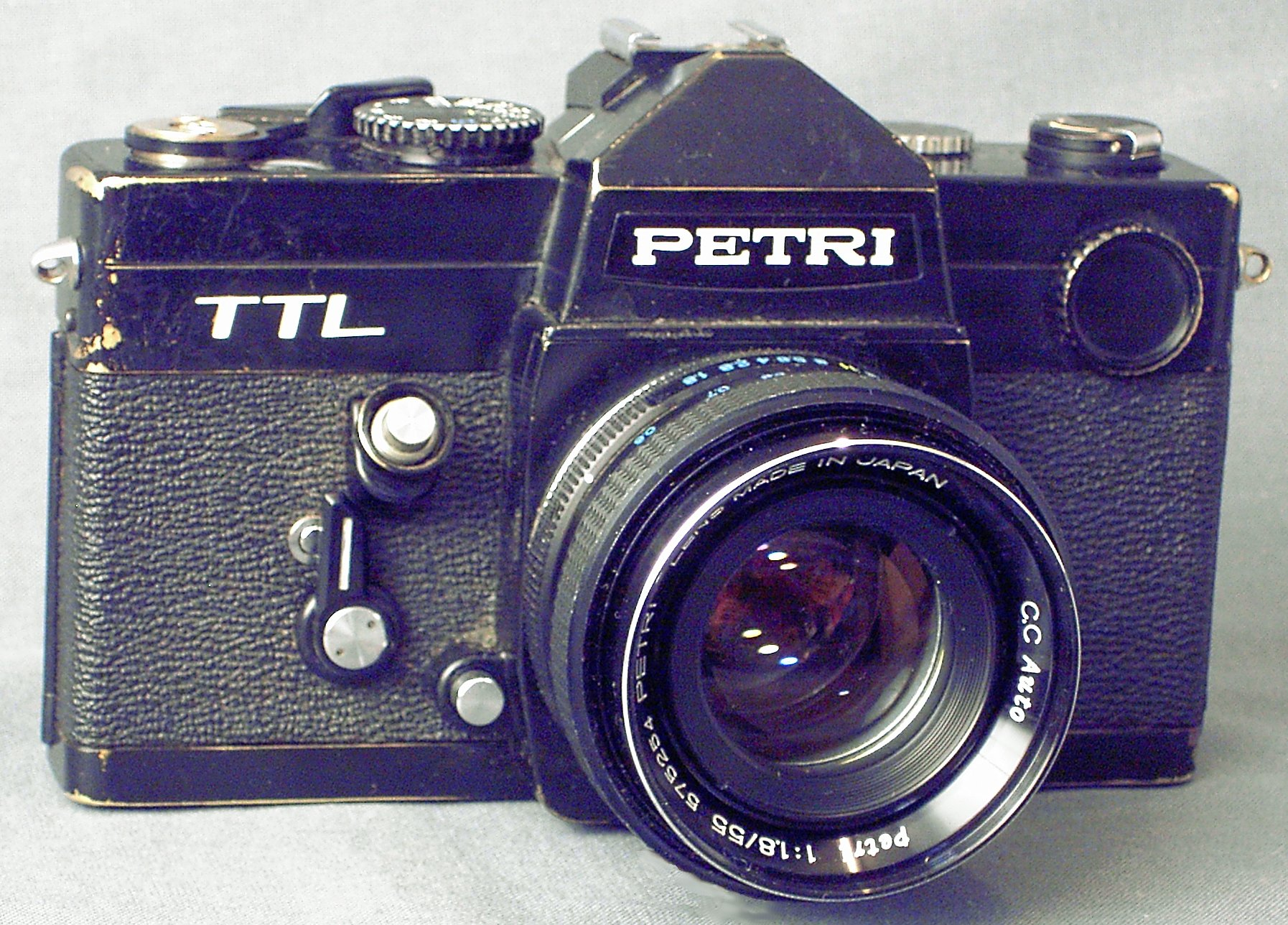
- Petri TTL with Petri 55mm f/1:1.8

Overview
- Maker: Petri Camera Company
- Type: 35 mm SLR

Lens
- Lens mount: M42

Sensor/medium
- Film speed: ISO 25 to 1600 (DIN 15 to 33)

Focusing
- Focus: Manual

Exposure/metering
- Exposure: Manual
- Exposure metering: EV3 to EV18 @ ASA 100 / DIN 21

Flash
- Flash: Hot shoe, PC socket
- Flash synchronization: 1/60 s

Shutter
- Frame rate: Manual lever winding.
- Shutter speed range: 1 s to 1/1000 s & 'B'

General
- Battery: PX-625
- Dimensions: 93 × 151 × 53 mm (house only)
- Weight: 700 g (housing only)
- Made in: Japan

Petri TTL was a manual 35 mm SLR camera with TTL metering. It was built by Petri Camera Company, Japan, from 1974. It is unknown when the production stopped.

== Features ==
The Petri TTL was a no-frills and very conservative camera. It was quite big and of heavy, all-metal construction. The only 'luxury' item found on the camera was a self-timer.

The camera was fully manual, with a built-in CdS light meter. The battery was only for the metering circuit. The user needed to push a button on the front of the camera to close the aperture, and then set the aperture ring on the lens to a value where the meter needle would fit inside a marker ring. After this, the user could let go of the button, and have full light in the viewfinder to compose the picture. On release of the shutter, the aperture would close to the correct setting.

As soon as the film was wound forwards, the light meter would switch on. It was not possible to switch it off manually, so the only way to conserve battery would be to delay advancing the film until the next exposure. It was not possible to attach a winder or motor to the camera.

The shutter was a horizontal cloth-curtain focal-plane shutter with a speed range of 1/1 to 1/1000 second. As it was fully mechanical, the camera could be used even if the battery was dead. Flash sync was set for 1/60 second.

The release button was placed in an uncommon spot, halfway down the front of the camera. If the user used the middle finger for the shutter release, it was possible to have an unusually solid grip on the housing.

For reasons unknown, it did not activate the self-timer: the timer had a separate release button that became available when the self-timer arm was cocked. Even with the self-timer ready, the camera could be used in the normal mode.

There were a wide range of lenses, bellows and other accessories available, both from Petri and from third-party producers.

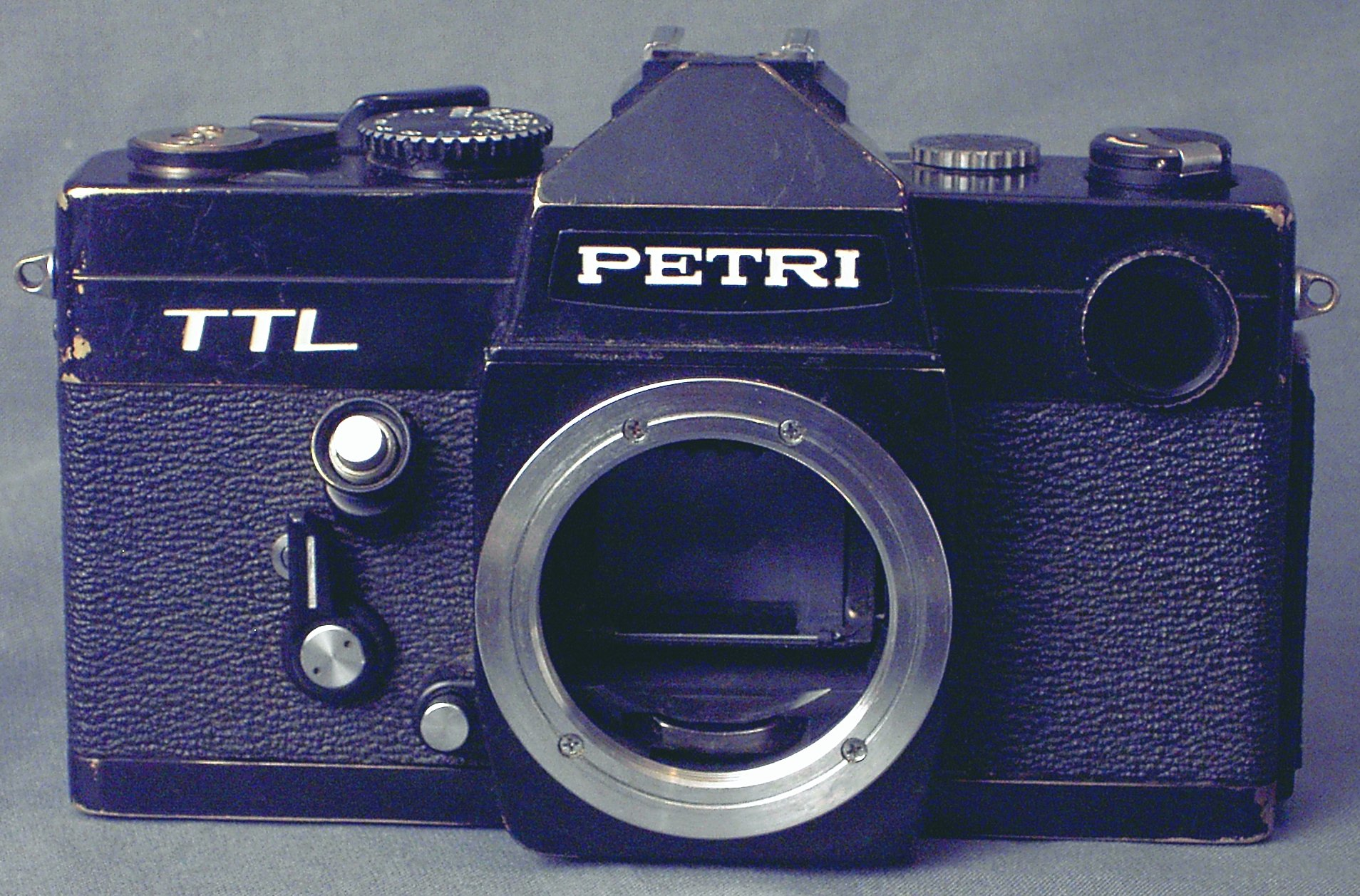
The camera housing alone.

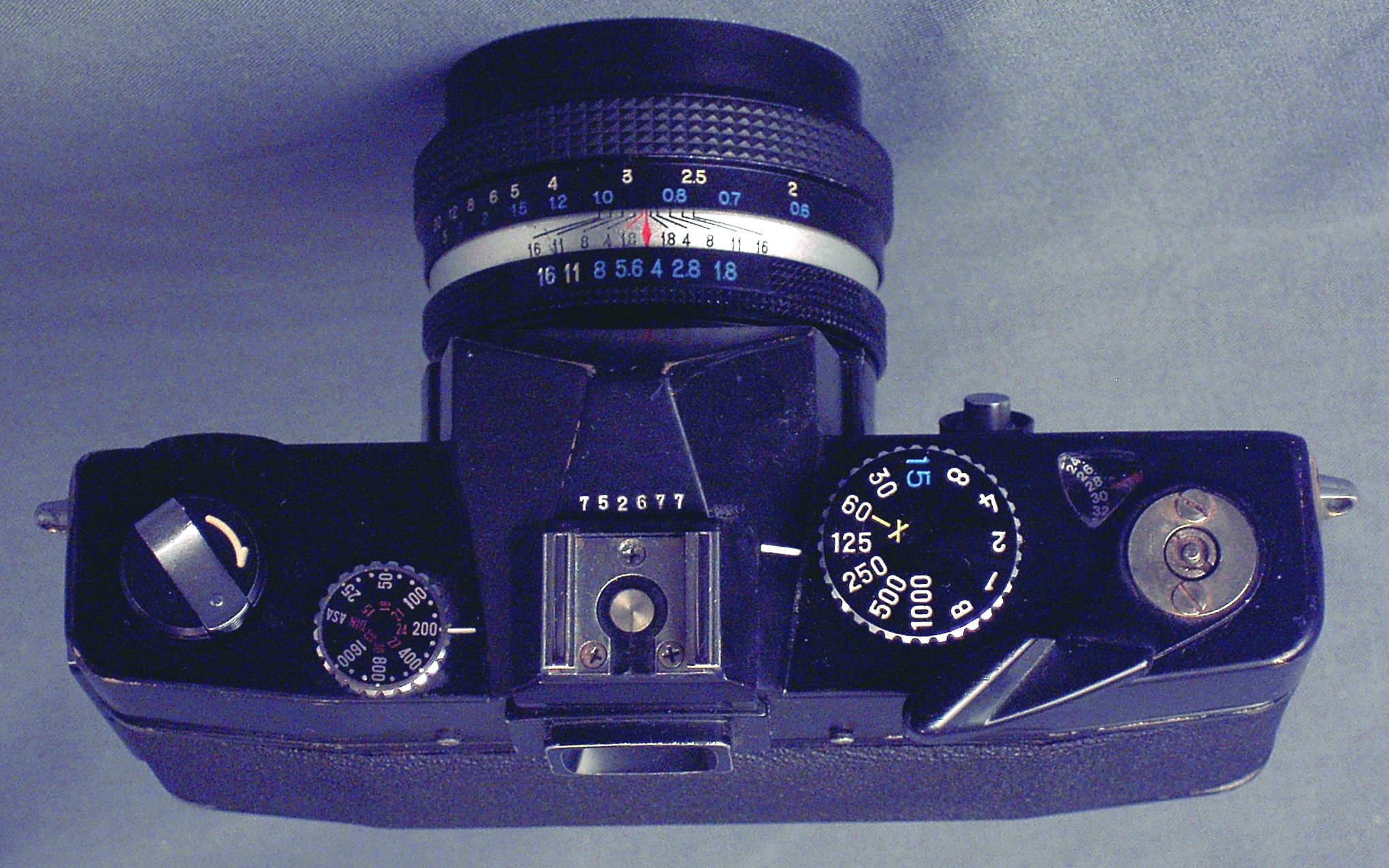
The camera top.

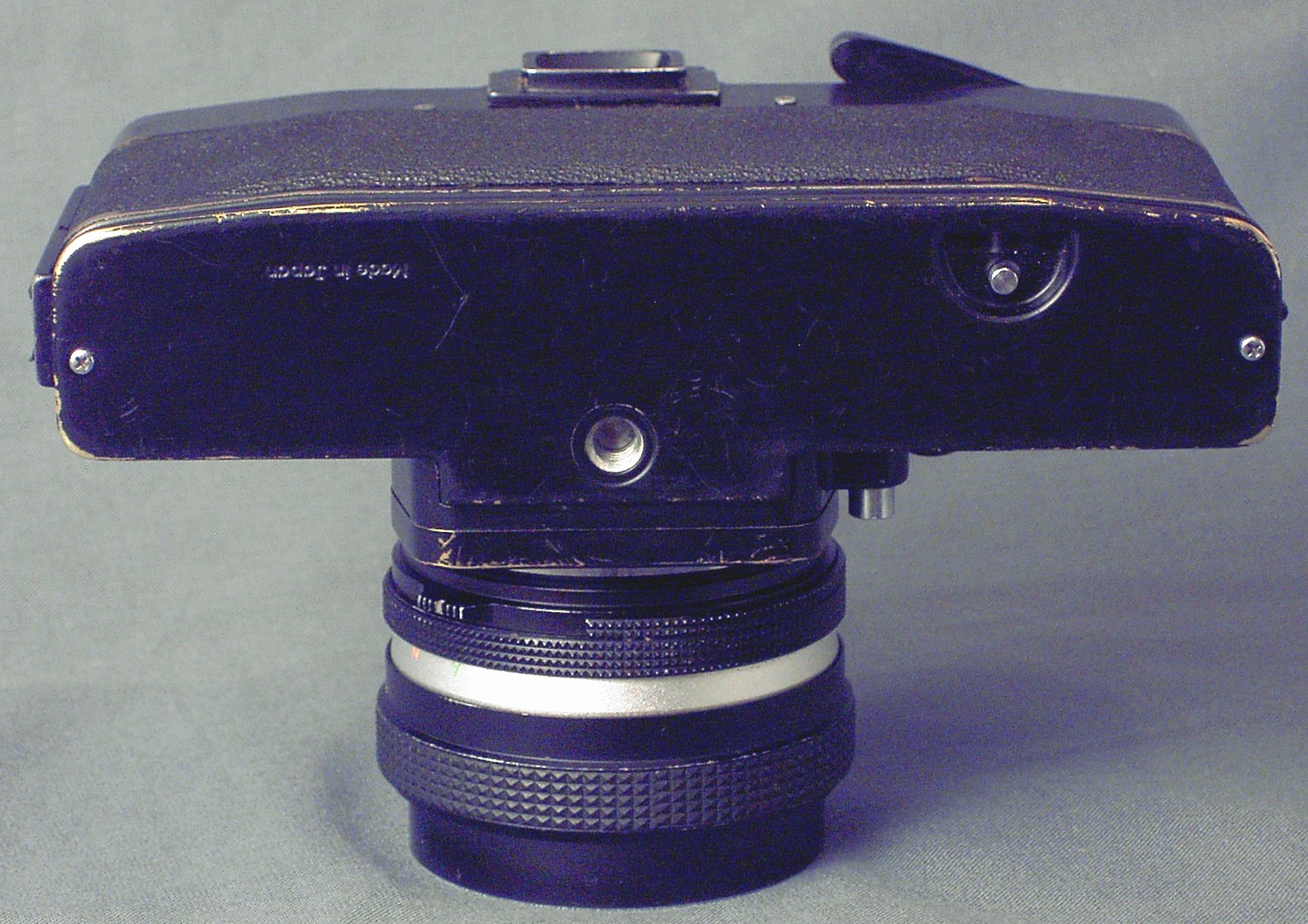
Bottom plate.

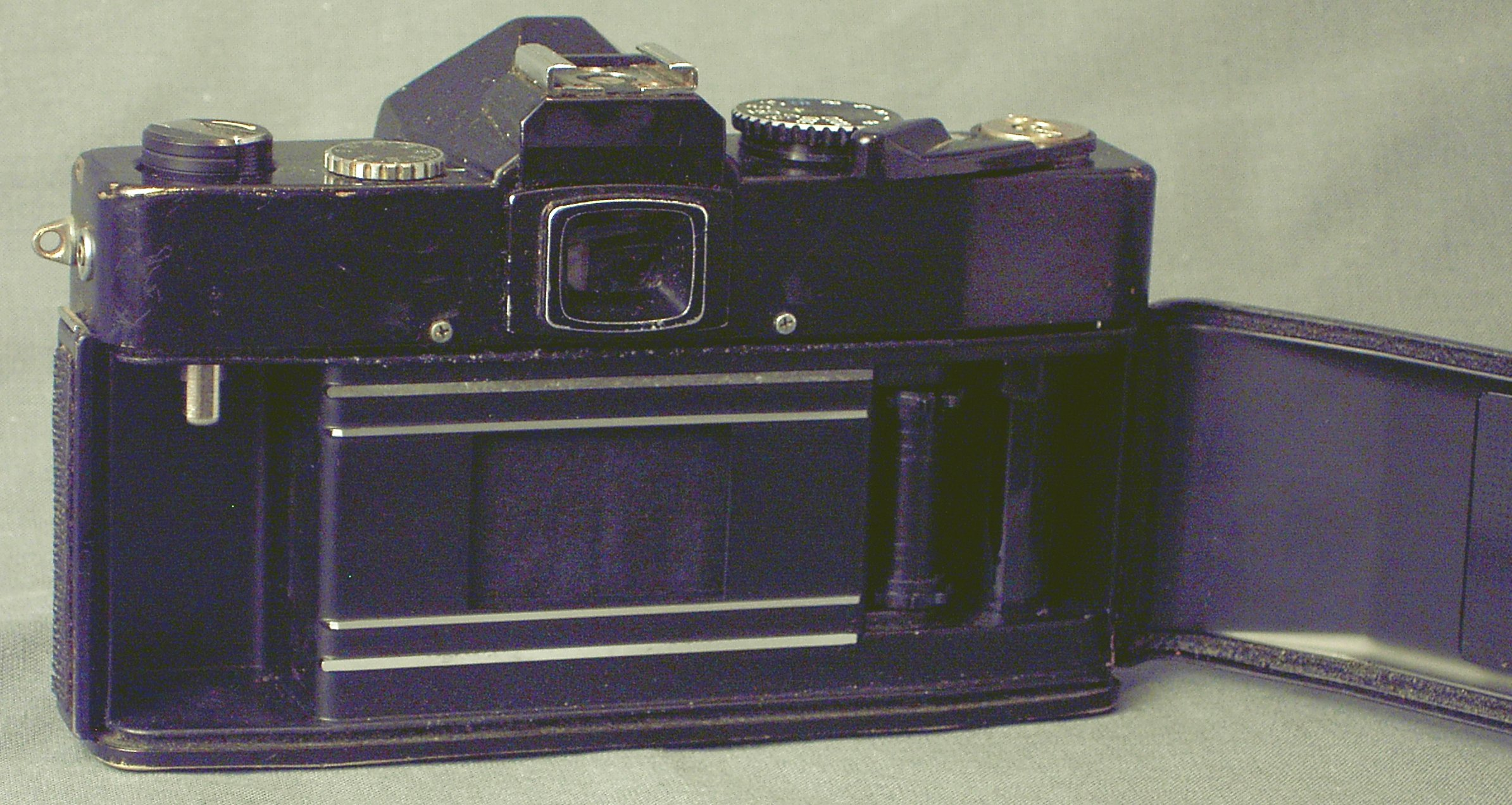
Interior.
