= Optique & Précision de Levallois =

French optical manufacturer

Société Optique et Précision de Levallois, S.A. (OPL) was founded in 1919, although its predecessor dated from 1911. It produced rangefinders, military, medical, and scientific optics, and the "Foca" and other rangefinder cameras, at Levallois (a Paris suburb) and Châteaudun (Eure-et-Loir).

Sales fell off after 1961 and on 1 January 1964 OPL entered into an arrangement with Lumière. In December 1964, the company merged with Société d'Optique et de Mécanique de Haute Précision (SOM), maker of SOM-Berthiot lenses, to form Société d'Optique, Précision, Electronique et Mécanique (SOPEM, later Sopelem), now at Dijon.
