= Kodak Ektra =

Rangefinder camera made by Kodak

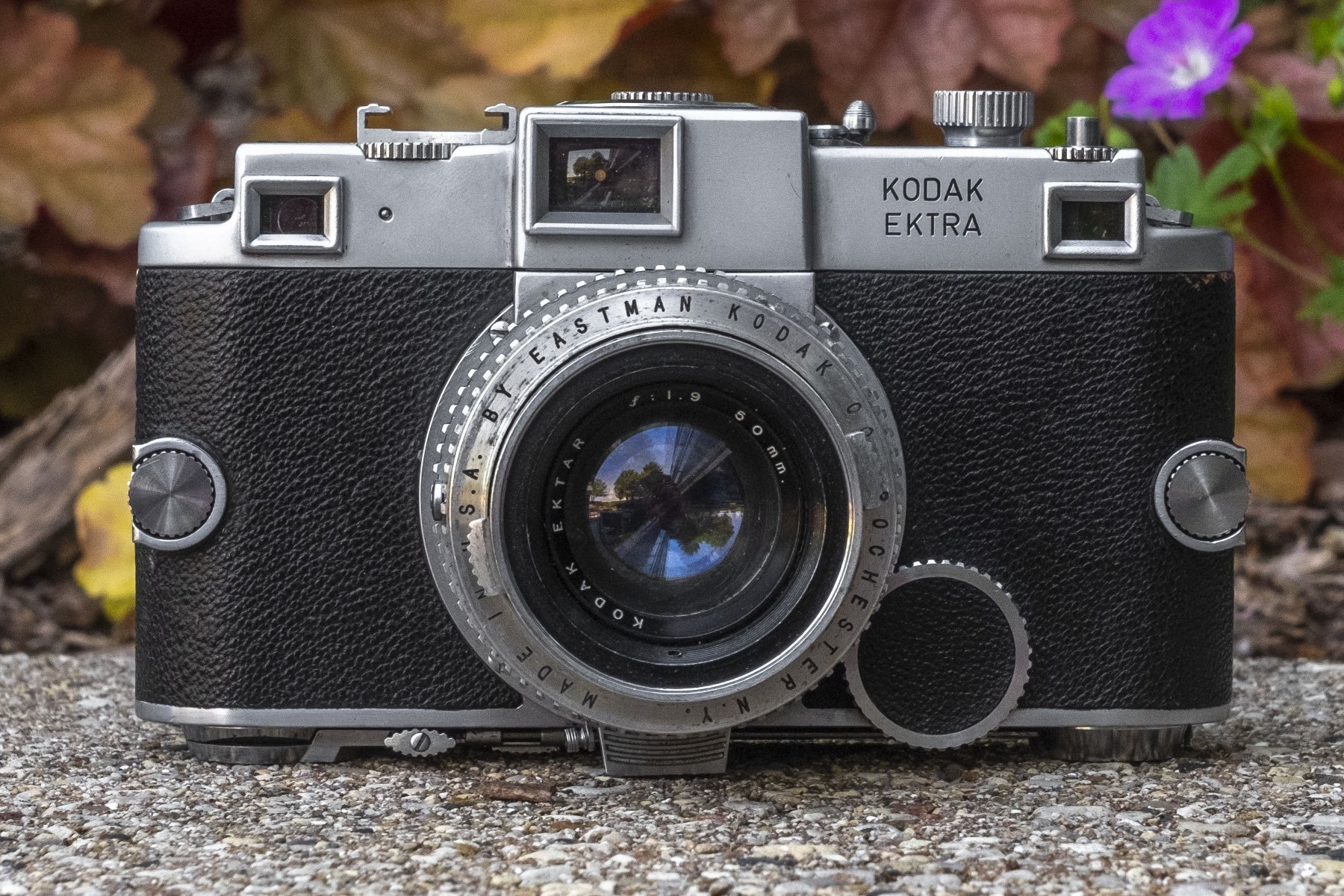
The Kodak Ektra was an 35mm rangefinder camera produced by the Eastman Kodak Company from 1941 to 1948.

The Kodak Ektra is a 35mm coupled rangefinder camera launched by Kodak USA in 1941. Originally regarded as one of the most innovative cameras of its type when first released, the Ektra featured the ability to cover both the highpoint and lowpoint of 35mm operation, but suffered from a faulty shutter. The camera was phased out after 1948, but the Ektra name was reused in the 1970s and later the 2010s.
