= Canon 7 =

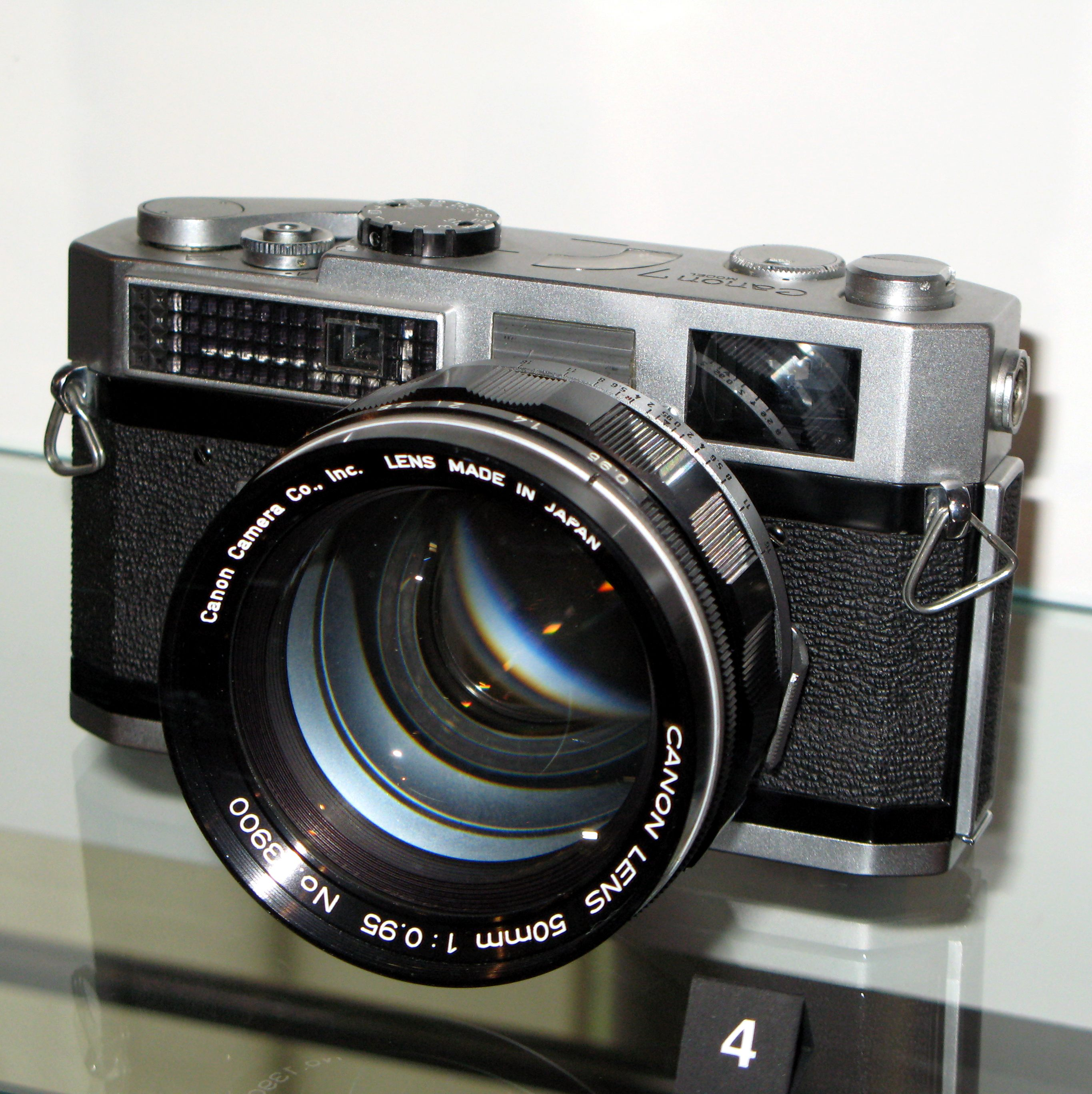

Overview
- Maker: Canon
- Type: 35 mm rangefinder camera
- Released: Sept 1961 Canon 7 April 1965 Canon 7s 1967 Canon 7sZ
- Production: 1961-1968 (1961-1965 Canon 7; 1965-1967 Canon 7s; 1967-1968 Canon 7sZ)

Lens
- Lens mount: Leica M39 Screw Mount with special bayonet mount for 50 mm f0.95 lens and the Canon Mirror Housing 2

Sensor/medium
- Recording medium: 135 film

Focusing
- Focus: manual

Exposure/metering
- Exposure: manual

Flash
- Flash: None on the 7; External cold shoe on the 7s

General
- Dimensions: 140×81×31 mm (5.5×3.2×1.2 in)

The Canon 7 is a focal-plane shutter rangefinder system camera with an integrated selenium light meter introduced by Canon Inc. in September 1961, the last model compatible with the Leica M39 lens mount. Later versions, branded Canon 7s and Canon 7s Type II (or Canon 7sZ), had a cadmium sulfide light meter.

== History ==
The Canon 7 came when the first Canon single-lens reflex cameras were already on the market, but it was felt that there was a need for a fast-shooting rangefinder camera for reportage. In this niche, the Canon 7 came into direct competition with the Leica M3.

Some Canon 7s were sold in the US branded Bell & Howell, in a partnership that lasted until 1975.
