= Kodak 35 Rangefinder =

35mm camera from Kodak

Kodak 35 RF c.1949
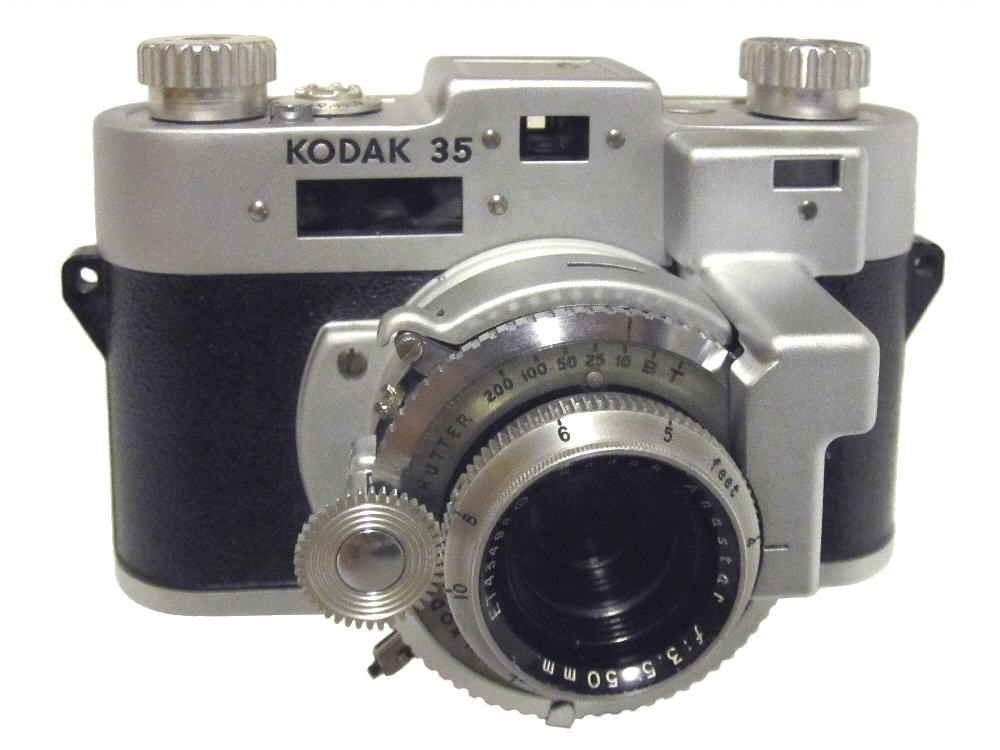

Overview
- Type: 35mm rangefinder

Focusing
- Focus: front element

Exposure/metering
- Exposure: 35mm format (24×36mm) on 135 film

The Kodak 35 Rangefinder is an improved version of the Kodak 35 that was launched by the Eastman Kodak Company in 1938 as their first 35mm camera manufactured in the USA. After some two years, the Company presented this improved Kodak 35 camera, with a new superstructure housing containing a viewfinder and a separate rangefinder, but without any addition to the identifying inscription on the body. It is generally referred to as the Kodak 35 Rangefinder model.

== Description ==
The centrally positioned eyepiece is for the viewfinder. An external mechanism, hidden inside the protrusion at the left-hand side of the lens/shutter assembly, relays the front lens element extension to the rangefinder optics by sensing the height of a milled cam at the periphery of the lens barrel just behind the toothed rim. Both the separate viewfinder and rangefinder eyepieces and the lens coupling are in the style of the Leica camera. The difference is the way in which the lever operates on the lens barrel. Looking through the small rangefinder window at the left-hand side at the back reveals a clear view of a horizontally split image. The lower image part is shifted sideways by turning the focusing wheel at the front right-hand side of the lens. By aligning the vertical feature of any object in the motive that crosses the split in the rangefinder image may render it sharp on the film.

The Rangefinder model was made available with a variety of shutter and lens combinations during its production run, which ended in 1951:

- 1940-1948: Kodak Anastigmat Special f/3.5 51mm in KODAMATIC SHUTTER, or
- 1940-1948: Kodak Anastigmat Special f/3.5 51mm in FLASH KODAMATIC SHUTTER,
- 1947-1951: Kodak Anastar Special f/3.5 50mm in KODAMATIC SHUTTER, or
- 1947-1951: Kodak Anastar Special f/3.5 50mm in FLASH KODAMATIC SHUTTER.

Note: This model is often referred to as the "gear coupled RF version" due to the conspicuously placed gear next to the lens front element. The gear however, only provides a means of turning the front element using a finger on the edge of the wheel, and is not part of the link between the lens and the rangefinder.

== The variations in finish and specifications ==
Some RF models have black knobs and some have black rangefinder protrusion next to the lens, but the majority have plated metal knobs. There was no civil production between 1942 and 1945. The post-war viewfinder and the rangefinder models were also black with bright-chromed metal features, and an accessory shoe was added to the viewfinder model next to the rewind knob. For a while during the period from 1947 to 1949, the knobs were also made of white plastic instead of metal. Both the metal- and the white rewind knobs have a film reminder dial in the hub.

A few minor modifications were also made to internal parts, notably to the film pressure plate spring that changes through a variety of shapes from rod to flat shape. Most, if not all shutters alternatives have a No. 5 Cable Release socket with a tiny removable coin-slotted screw plug, while the later ones also have a Kodak type flash synchroniser contact post. A metal band inscribed "Made in U.S.A." was attached to the top of the shutter housing cover plate, save for the last year or two of production. The milling pattern on the focusing wheel front goes through a variety of styles from flat to a pattern of several concentric circles.

The Kodak 35 came with a hard brown leather ever-ready case.

== Year of manufacture ==
The serial number on a Kodak manufactured lens is always preceded by a code consisting of two capital letters that indicates the year of manufacture using a 10 letter key word, CAMEROSITY, in which each letter in the word represents a corresponding numeral in the sequence 1234567890. Of these, the C is substituted by 1, the A by 2 etc. through to the Y by 0. "ET" thus gives the number 49 for the year 1949. The Kodak 35 serial number is engraved on the front ring on the lens.
