= Rangefinder camera =

Camera fitted with a rangefinder

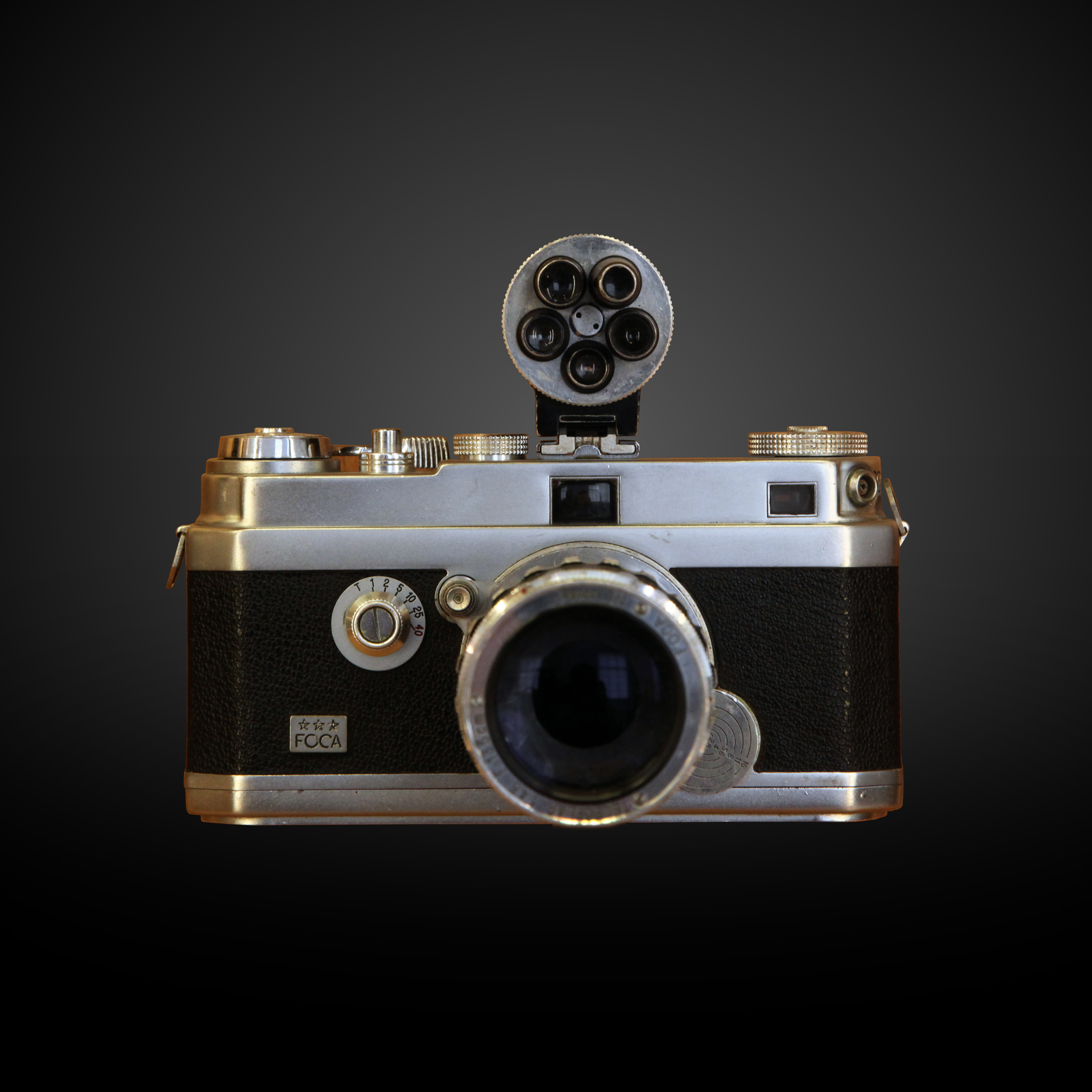
A Foca camera of 1947 at the Musée des Arts et Métiers in Paris

A rangefinder camera is a camera fitted with a rangefinder, typically a split-image rangefinder: a range-finding focusing mechanism allowing the photographer to measure the subject distance and take photographs that are in sharp focus.

Most varieties of rangefinder show two images of the same subject, one of which moves when a calibrated wheel is turned; when the two images coincide and fuse into one, the distance can be read off the wheel. Older, non-coupled rangefinder cameras display the focusing distance and require the photographer to transfer the value to the lens focus ring; cameras without built-in rangefinders could have an external rangefinder fitted into the accessory shoe. Earlier cameras of this type had separate viewfinder and rangefinder windows; later the rangefinder was incorporated into the viewfinder. More modern designs have rangefinders coupled to the focusing mechanism so that the lens is focused correctly when the rangefinder images fuse; compare with the focusing screen in non-autofocus SLRs.

Almost all digital cameras, and most later film cameras, measure distance using electroacoustic or electronic means and focus automatically (autofocus); however, it is not customary to speak of this functionality as a rangefinder.

== History ==
Rangefinder Camera Mechanism. Some cameras (Argus C3) do not have a beam splitter; these cameras instead have a separate viewfinder.

The first rangefinders, sometimes called "telemeters", appeared in the twentieth century; the first rangefinder camera to be marketed was the 3A Kodak Autographic Special of 1916; the rangefinder was coupled. Not itself a rangefinder camera, the Leica I of 1925 had popularized the use of accessory rangefinders. The Leica II and Zeiss Contax I, both of 1932, were great successes as 35 mm rangefinder cameras, while on the Leica Standard, also introduced in 1932, the rangefinder was omitted. The Contax II (1936) integrated the rangefinder in the center of the viewfinder.

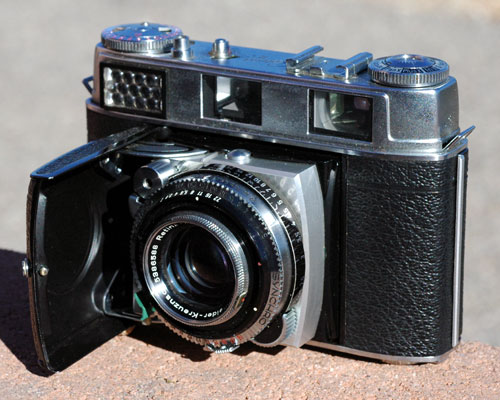
1957–60 Kodak Retina IIIC

Rangefinder cameras were common from the 1930s to the 1970s, but the more advanced models lost ground to single-lens reflex (SLR) cameras.

Rangefinder cameras have been made in all sizes and all film formats over the years, from 35 mm through medium format (rollfilm) to large-format press cameras. Until the mid-1950s most were generally fitted to more expensive models of cameras. Folding bellows rollfilm cameras, such as the Balda Super Baldax or Mess Baldix, the Kodak Retina II, IIa, IIc, IIIc, and IIIC cameras and the Hans Porst Hapo 66e (a cheaper version of the Balda Mess Baldix), were often fitted with rangefinders.

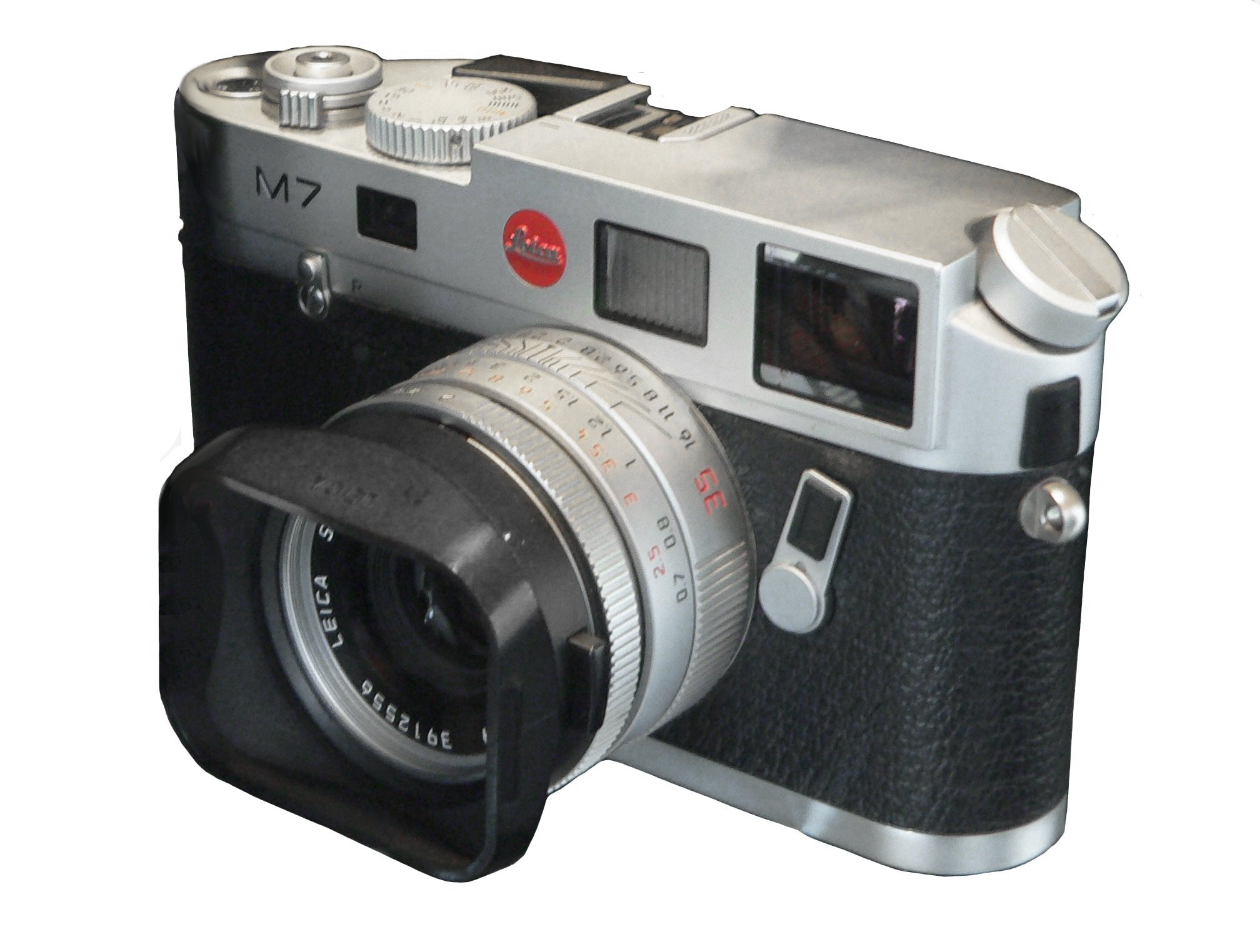
Leica M7 rangefinder

The best-known rangefinder cameras take 35 mm film, use focal plane shutters, and have interchangeable lenses. These are Leica screwmount (also known as M39) cameras developed for lens manufacturer Ernst Leitz Wetzlar by Oskar Barnack (which gave rise to very many imitations and derivatives), Contax cameras manufactured for Carl Zeiss Optics by camera subsidiary Zeiss-Ikon and, after Germany's defeat in World War II, produced again and then developed as the Soviet Kiev), Nikon S-series cameras from 1951 to 1962 (with design inspired by the Contax and function by the Leica), and Leica M-series cameras.

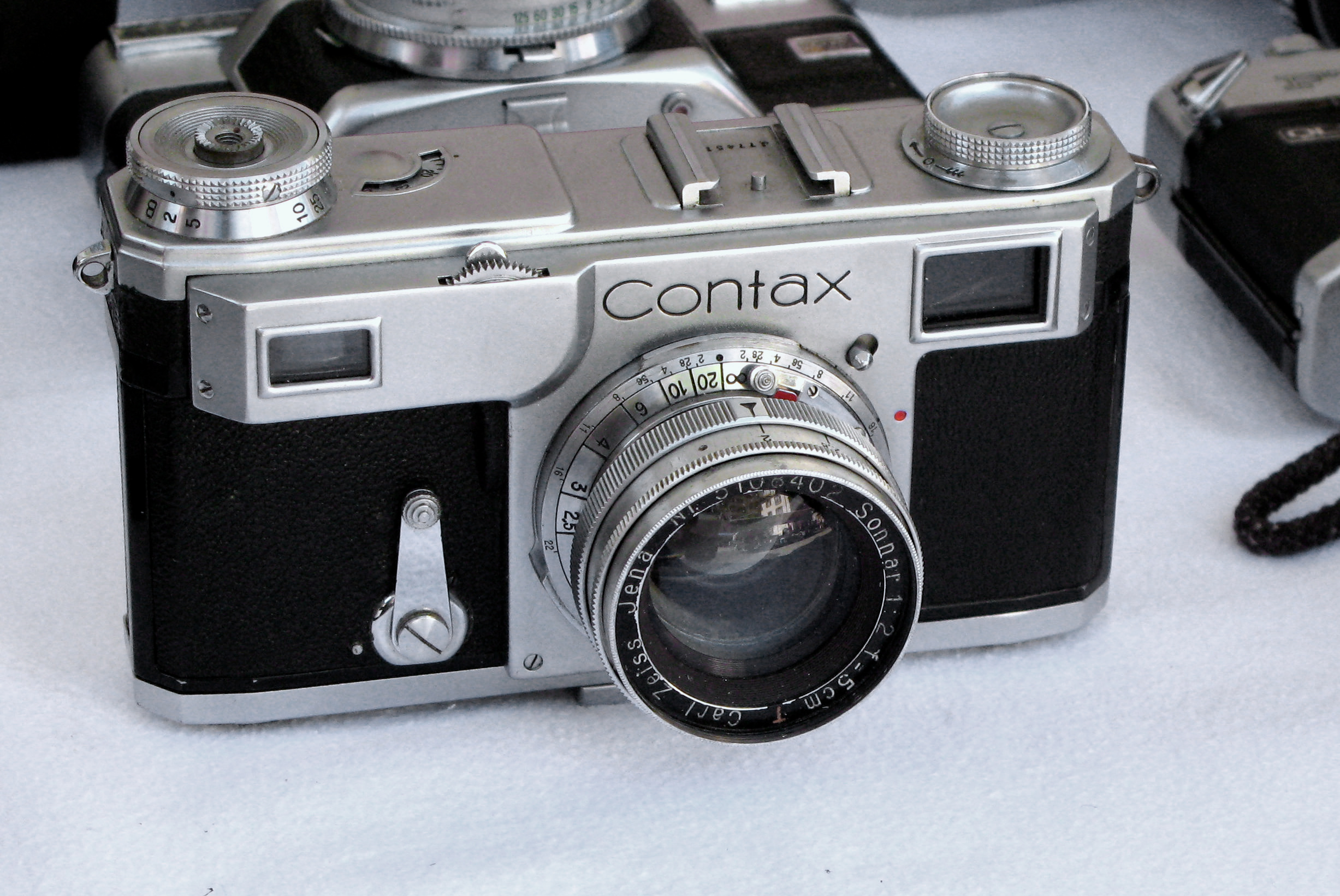
Contax II

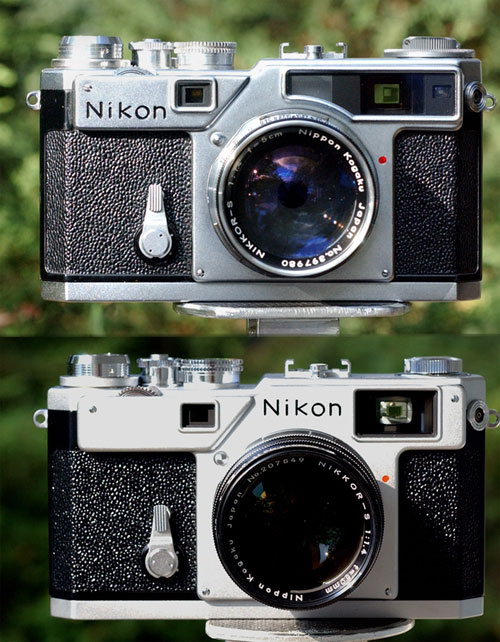
Nikon SP and S3 cameras

The Nikon rangefinder cameras were "discovered" in 1950 by Life magazine photographer David Douglas Duncan, who covered the Korean War. Canon manufactured several models from the 1930s until the 1960s; models from 1946 onwards were more or less compatible with the Leica thread mount. (From late 1951 they were completely compatible; the 7 and 7s had a bayonet mount for the 50 mm f/0.95 lens in addition to the thread mount for other lenses.)

Launched in 1940, the Kodak 35 Rangefinder was the first 35mm camera made by the Eastman Kodak Company. Other such cameras include the Casca (Steinheil, West Germany, 1948), Detrola 400 (USA, 1940–41), Ektra (Kodak, USA, 1941–8), Foca (OPL, France, 1947–63), Foton (Bell & Howell, USA, 1948), Opema II (Meopta, Czechoslovakia, 1955–60), Perfex (USA, 1938–49), Robot Royal (Robot-Berning, West Germany, 1955–76), and Witness (Ilford, Britain, 1953).

In the United States, Argus (especially the C-3 "Brick") was one of the most popular 35mm rangefinder, with millions sold.

Interchangeable-lens rangefinder cameras with focal-plane shutters are greatly outnumbered by fixed-lens leaf-shutter rangefinder cameras. The most popular design in the 1950s were folding designs like the Kodak Retina and the Zeiss Contessa.

In the 1960s many fixed-lens 35 mm rangefinder cameras for the amateur market were produced by several manufacturers, mainly Japanese, including Canon, Fujica, Konica, Mamiya, Minolta, Olympus, Petri Camera, Ricoh, and Yashica. Distributors such as Vivitar and Revue often sold rebranded versions of these cameras. While designed to be compact like the Leica, they were much less expensive. Many of them, such as the Minolta 7sII and the Vivitar 35ES, were fitted with high-speed, extremely high quality optics. Though eventually replaced in the market with newer compact autofocus cameras, many of these older rangefinders continue to operate, having outlived most of their newer (and less well-constructed) successors.

Starting with a camera made by the small Japanese company Yasuhara in the 1990s, there has been something of a revival of rangefinder cameras. Aside from the Leica M series, rangefinder models from this period include the Konica Hexar RF, Cosina, who makes the Voigtländer Bessa T/R/R2/R3/R4 (the last three are made in both manual or aperture automatic version, which use respectly the "m" or "a" sign in model), and the Hasselblad Xpan/Xpan 2. Zeiss had a new model called the Zeiss Ikon, also made by Cosina but now discontinued, while Nikon has also produced expensive limited editions of its S3 and SP rangefinders to satisfy the demands of collectors and aficionados. Cameras from the former Soviet Union—the Zorki and FED, based on the screwmount Leica, and the Kiev—are plentiful in the used market.

Medium-format rangefinder cameras continued to be produced until 2014. Recent models included the Mamiya 6 and 7I/7II, the Bronica RF645 and the Fuji G, GF, GS, GW and GSW series.

In 1994, Contax introduced an autofocus rangefinder camera, the Contax G.

== Digital rangefinder ==
=== Epson R-D1, Zenit M and PIXII ===
Digital imaging technology was applied to rangefinder cameras for the first time in 2004, with the introduction of the Epson R-D1, the first ever digital rangefinder camera. The RD-1 was a collaboration between Epson and Cosina. The R-D1 and later R-D1s use Leica M-mount lenses, or earlier Leica screw mount lenses with an adapter.

After the discontinuation of the R-D1, only Leica M digital rangefinders were in production until the introduction of two additional rangefinders in late 2018:

- the Pixii Camera (A1112) from France-based firm Pixii SAS; and
- the re-emergence of the Russian camera manufacturer Zenit with the limited release (500 units) Zenit M designed in Krasnogorsk and made in collaboration with Leica.

Both the Pixii and the Zenit M are true mechanical rangefinders, and they employ the Leica M mount, affording compatibility with current lens lines from Voigtlander, Zeiss, and Leica themselves.

=== Leica M ===
Leica released its first digital rangefinder camera, the Leica M8, in 2006. The M8 and R-D1 are expensive compared to more common digital SLRs, and lack several features that are common with modern digital cameras, such as autofocus, live preview, movie recording, and face detection. They have no real telephoto lenses available beyond 135 mm focal length and very limited macro ability.

Later, Leica released the Leica M (Typ 240) digital rangefinder, which adds live preview, video recording and focusing assistance, the Leica M Monochrom, which is similar to the Leica M9 but shoots solely in black and white, the Leica M Edition 60 which is similar to the M (Typ 240) but omits a rear display panel as a homage to film cameras, and the M10 and M11 without video recording.

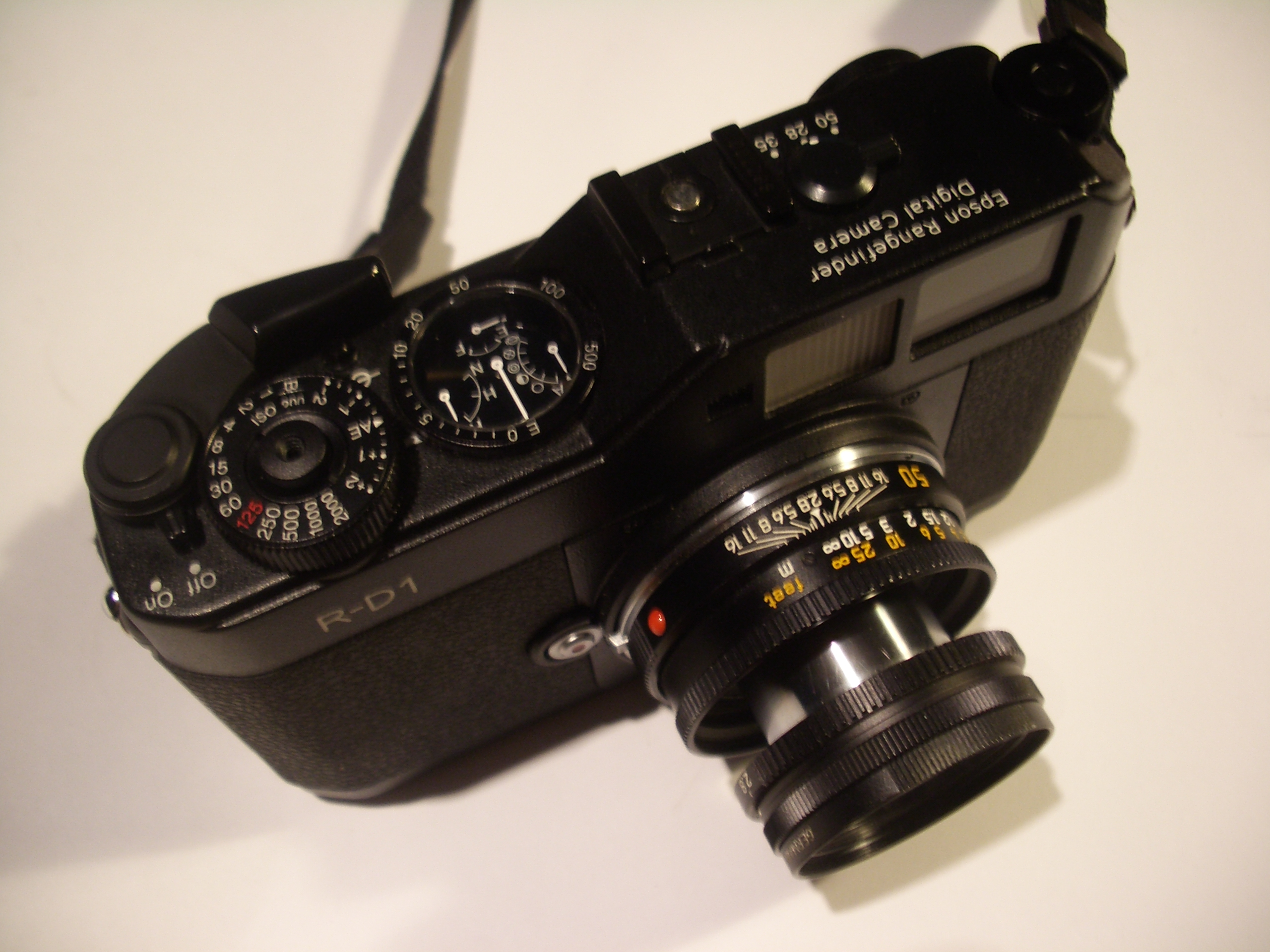
The Epson R-D1 with a Leica lens

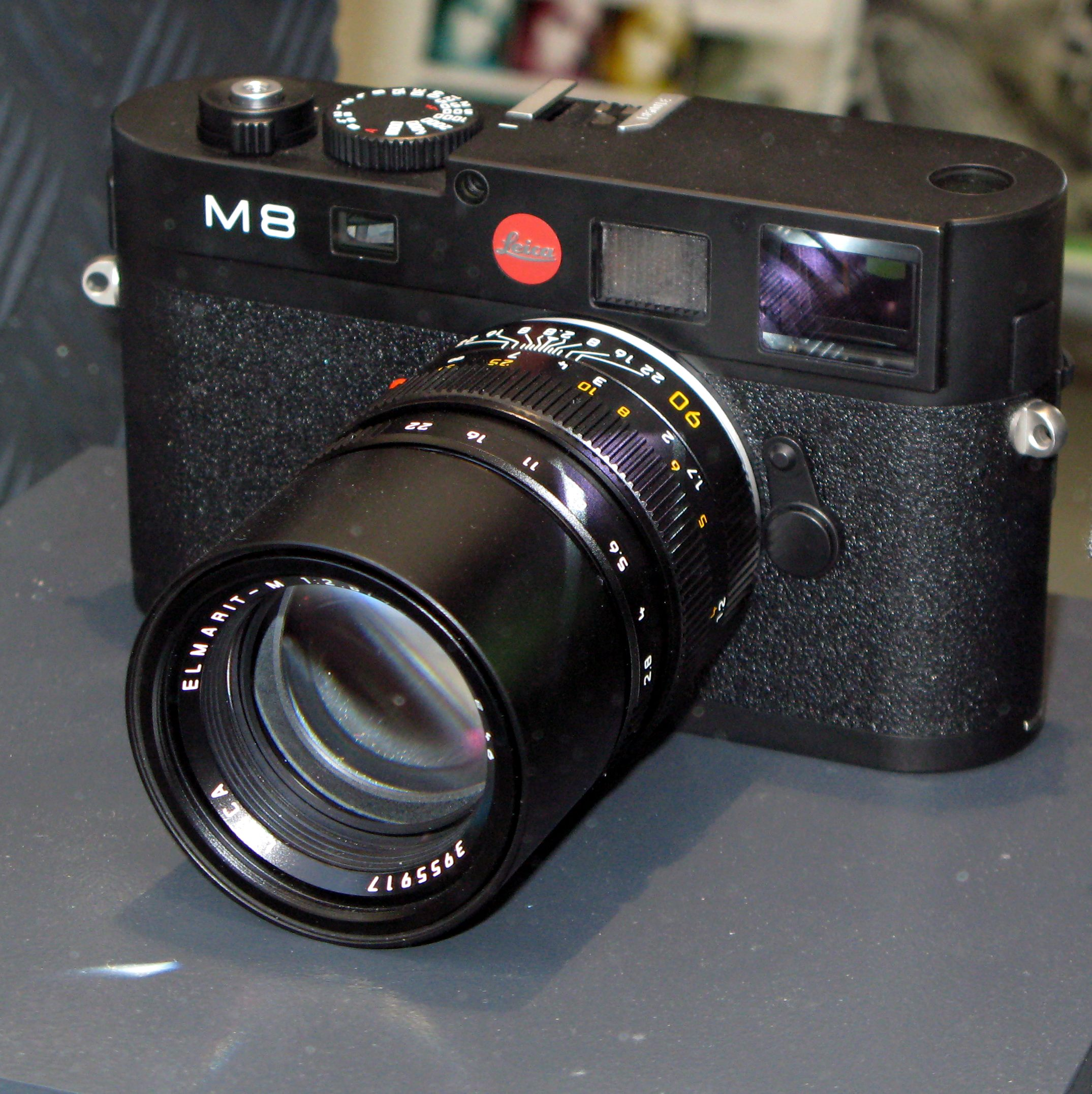
The Leica M8

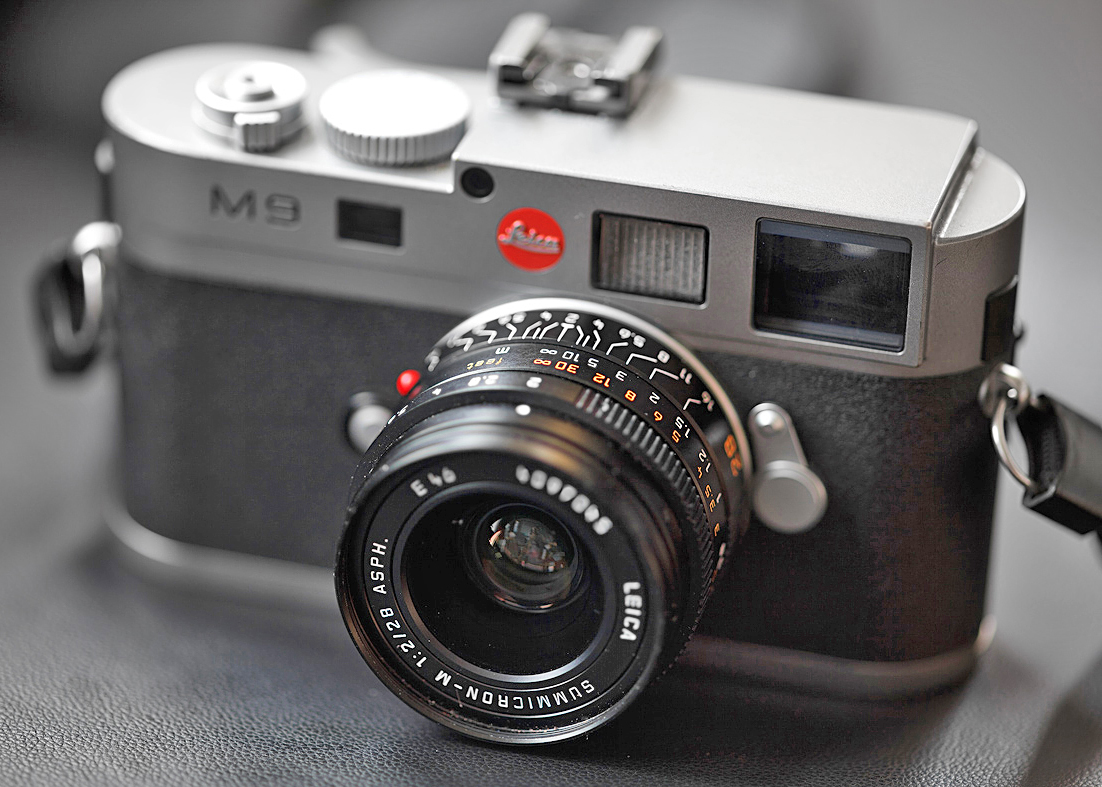
The Leica M9

== Pros and cons ==
=== Viewfinder parallax ===
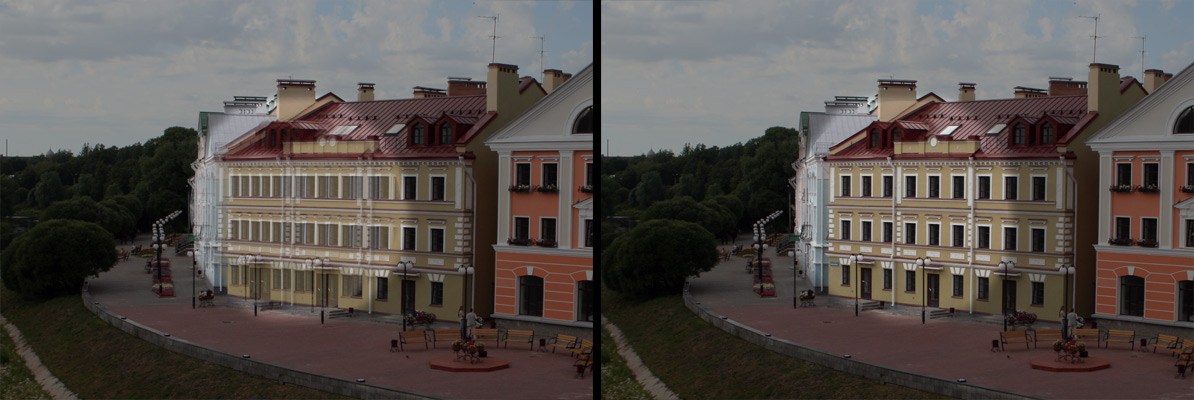
Example of the unfocused and focused image in rangefinder window

The viewfinder of a rangefinder camera is offset from the picture-taking lens so that the image viewed is not exactly what will be recorded on the film; this parallax error is negligible at large subject distances but becomes significant as the distance decreases. For extreme close-up photography, the rangefinder camera is awkward to use, as the viewfinder no longer points at the subject.

More advanced rangefinder cameras project into the viewfinder a brightline frame that moves as the lens is focused, correcting parallax error down to the minimum distance at which the rangefinder functions. The angle of view of a given lens also changes with distance, and the brightline frames in the finders of a few cameras automatically adjust for this as well.

In contrast, the viewfinder pathway of an SLR transmits an image directly "through the lens". This eliminates parallax errors at any subject distance, thus allowing for macro photography. It also removes the need to have separate viewfinders for different lens focal lengths. In particular, this allows for extreme telephoto lenses which would otherwise be very hard to focus and compose with a rangefinder. Furthermore, the through-the-lens view allows the viewfinder to directly display the depth of field for a given aperture, which is not possible with a rangefinder design. To compensate for this, rangefinder users often use zone focusing, which is especially applicable to the rapid-fire approach to street photography.

=== Large lenses block viewfinder ===
Larger lenses may block a portion of the view seen through the viewfinder, potentially a significant proportion. A side effect of this is that lens designers are forced to use smaller designs. Lens hoods used for rangefinder cameras may have a different shape to those with other cameras, with openings cut out of them to increase the visible area.

=== Difficulty integrating zoom lenses ===
The rangefinder design is not readily adapted for use with zoom lenses, which have a continuously variable field of view. The only true zoom lens for rangefinder cameras is the Contax G2 Carl Zeiss 35–70 mm Vario-Sonnar T* Lens with built-in zoom viewfinder. A very few lenses, such as the Konica M-Hexanon Dual or Leica Tri-Elmar, let the user select among two or three focal lengths; the viewfinder must be designed to work with all focal lengths of any lens used. The rangefinder may become misaligned, leading to incorrect focusing.

=== Historically unobtrusive ===
Rangefinder cameras are often quieter, particularly with leaf shutters, and smaller than competing SLR models. These qualities once made rangefinders more attractive for theater photography, some portrait photography, candid and street photography, and any application where an SLR is too large or obtrusive. However, today mirrorless digital cameras are capable of excellent low light performance, are much smaller, and can be completely silent.

=== Absence of mirror ===
The absence of a mirror allows the rear element of lenses to project deep into the camera body, making high-quality wide-angle lenses easier to design. The Voigtländer 12 mm lens is the widest-angle rectilinear lens in general production, with a 121-degree angle of view; only recently have equivalent SLR lenses become available, though optically inferior. The absence of a mirror also means that rangefinder lenses have the potential to be significantly smaller than equivalent lenses for SLRs as they need not accommodate mirror swing. This ability to have high quality lenses and camera bodies in a compact form made Leica cameras and other rangefinders particularly appealing to photojournalists.

Since there is no moving mirror, as used in SLRs, there is no momentary blackout of the subject being photographed.

=== Field of view ===
Rangefinder viewfinders usually have a field of view slightly greater than the lens in use. This allows the photographer to be able to see what is going on outside of the frame, and therefore better anticipate the action, at the expense of a smaller image. In addition, with viewfinders with magnifications larger than 0.8x (e.g. some Leica cameras, the Epson RD-1/s, Canon 7, Nikon S, and in particular the Voigtländer Bessa R3A and R3M with their 1:1 magnification), photographers can keep both eyes open and effectively see a floating viewfinder frame superimposed on their real world view. This kind of two-eyed viewing is also possible with an SLR, using a lens focal length that results in a net viewfinder magnification close to 1.0 (usually a focal length slightly longer than a normal lens); use of a much different focal length would result in a viewfinder with a different magnification than the open eye, making fusion of the images impossible. There is also the difference of the eye-level since the eye looking in the viewfinder actually sees the frame from slightly below the other eye. This means that the final image perceived by the viewer will not be totally even, but rather leaning on one side. This issue can be avoided by shooting in vertical (i.e. portrait) orientation, shooting style and framing allowing.

=== Use of filters ===
If filters that absorb much light or change the colour of the image are used, it is difficult to compose, view, and focus on an SLR, but the image through a rangefinder viewfinder is unaffected. On the other hand, some filters, such as graduated filters and polarizers, are best used with SLRs as the effects they create need to be viewed directly.
