= Pixii (cameras) =

Series of digital rangefinder by french manufacturer

Pixii+ (A2572+)
Overview
- Maker: Pixii
- Type: Digital rangefinder camera
- Released: November 2023
- Intro price: €2,699 (16 GB model)

Lens
- Lens: Leica M-mount

Sensor/medium
- Sensor: 3:2 APS-C inducing a 1.5 crop factor
- Sensor type: BSI-CMOS
- Sensor maker: Sony
- Maximum resolution: 26 megapixels (6244 x 4168 pixels)
- Film speed: ISO 160 up to ISO 12800
- Recording medium: Internal storage: 16 GB up to 256 GB

Focusing
- Focus modes: Manual

Shutter
- Shutter: Electronic shutter
- Shutter speed range: 2s to 1/32000

Viewfinder
- Viewfinder: Optical viewfinder with coinciding rangefinder
- Electronic viewfinder: LED backlit additional informations (frame lines, exposure indicators, etc)
- Viewfinder magnification: x0.67
- Frame coverage: 100%

General
- Battery: Li-ion 7.2V battery, 1080mAh capacity, model NP-FW50
- Data port(s): Bluetooth, plus USB-C for charging, display and transfer
- Body features: Dual-block machined aluminium body, upgradeable components
- Dimensions: 138×79×33 mm (5.4×3.1×1.3 in)
- Weight: 460 g (16 oz) including battery
- Made in: France

Chronology
- Replaced: A2572 (2022)
- Predecessor: A1571 (2021), A1112 (2020)

The Pixii is a series of digital rangefinder cameras introduced by the homonymous French manufacturer in 2018. They have been often compared with the Leica M series.

Beside their rangefinder properties the Pixii series is known for their upgradeable design, lack of an LCD screen to preview photos, tight integration with smartphones and unavailability of external storage.

A full-frame version, the Pixii Max, was released in July 2024.

== Features ==
The first Pixii camera (A1112) was announced by the homonymous French startup in 2018, featuring rangefinder experience, M-mount and an APS-C CMOS sensor with global electronic shutter only. The body did not include an LCD to review photos, instead relying on the optical rangefinder and smartphone integration. Regarding storage an internal solution was favored instead of a card slot. The camera had and ISO range of 200 to 6400. The 12MP camera officially became available to purchase in July 2020, at the price of 2,900 euro for the 8 GB model.

In October 2021, a new model (A1571) became available, boosting an improved 26MP BSI-CMOS image sensor, interactive optical viewfinder, and USB-C connectivity. Price started at 2,999 USD for the base storage model and an upgrade path was offered to previous buyer, relying on the modular design of the camera. DxOMark rated the dynamic range of the camera at around 13.5 stops, comparing it to the Leica M10.

Another model (A2572) was introduced in December 2022, featuring a 64-bit processor which improved battery life, processing speed and transfer speed. It was further upgraded in November 2023 (A2572+) with a refined viewfinder and eyepiece.

In July 2024, the Pixii Max was announced. The first full-frame camera of the series, at a price of 3,999 euro excluding tax for the 32 GB model.

== Reception ==
The original Pixii model (A1112) entered beta in June 2020. One reviewer recalls the intrigue he perceived upon the announcement, noting the simple interface, minimal amount of buttons and industrial design. The Pixii aims for a niche rangefinder market, intentionally offering a reduced amount of choices, while still boosting modern technologies in a non-mechanical body. He compares it with the Sigma's Foveon strategy, in praise of variety and against the one-fit-all design goals of major manufacturers.

In December 2021, his follow up review of the A1571 praised the upgradable design of the camera and the ongoing software updates. Noting an improved viewfinder, better noise that slightly falls short of competition, and the new USB-C connector. He remarked that even though it will be compared to Leica, the Pixii stands alone. He criticized current connectivity issues on macOS, imperfect white balance, and a rangefinder patch that is not as good as the one Leica offers.

Another reviewer compared, with a model provided by the manufacturer, the monochrome abilities of the Pixii to the Olympus OM-1 and Phase One IQ260 Achromatic. Even though a true monochrome sensor will deliver less noise and artifacts, most users will never notice, caring more about contrast and shadow performances. He also remarked that some lenses could block the rangefinder focusing window.

A third reviewer received the A2572 model on loan from the manufacturer. They described it as even more purist than a Leica, praising the build quality of the Besançon manufacturer. The Pixii is sized similarly to the M10, while still being lighter than a M11. They confirmed the good dynamic range and rolling shutter performances. They complained about bad average metering, a missing hot shoe for flash, poor artifact-prone JPEGs produced by the camera, and extremely short battery life, which delivered 120 shots in a single charge. Similarly to other reviewers they noted that large size m-mount lenses will block the rangefinder, requiring an additional viewfinder, and that the monochrome mode is unable to compete with the monochrome M10.
