= List of Instax cameras and printers =

This is a list of cameras and printers designed for use with Fujifilm's Instax series of instant film.

== Instax Mini ==
Legend:	Discontinued	Current

Category	Manufacturer	Model	Release	Lens	Shutter (s)	Exposure	Batteries	Size W×H×D (mm)	Weight (body)	Notes	Image
Camera	Fujifilm	Instax Mini 10	November 10, 1998		1/30 to 1/400	Automatic	2× CR123	119 × 113 × 58	335 g (11.8 oz)		
Camera	Fujifilm	Instax Mini 30	May 2002	60 mm ƒ/12	1/30 to 1/400	Automatic	2× CR2	122 × 106 × 52	325 g (11.4 oz)		
Camera	Fujifilm	Instax Mini 20	December 2002	60 mm ƒ/12	1/30 to 1/400	Automatic	2× CR2	115.5 × 121.5 × 52	310 g (10.9 oz)	Similar to Polaroid Mio	
Camera	Fujifilm	Instax Mini 55	March 2003	60 mm ƒ/12.7	1/30 to 1/400	Automatic	2× CR2	112.0 × 96.5 × 49.5	275 g (9.7 oz)		
Camera	Fujifilm	Instax Mini 50	September 2003	60 mm ƒ/12.7	1/30 to 1/400	Automatic	2× CR2	112.0 × 96.5 × 49.5	275 g (9.7 oz)		
Camera	Fujifilm	Instax Mini 7	June 2004	60 mm ƒ/12.7	1/60	Manual (4 settings)	4× LR6/AA	119.5 × 121.5 × 70.5	320 g (11.3 oz)		
Camera	Fujifilm	Instax Mini 7S	June 2008	60 mm ƒ/12.7	1/60	Manual (4 settings)	4× LR6/AA	119.5 × 121.5 × 70.5	320 g (11.3 oz)		
Camera	Fujifilm	Instax Mini 25	June 2009	60 mm ƒ/12.7	1/3 to 1/400	Automatic	2× CR2	112.0 × 121.0 × 50.5	275 g (9.7 oz)		
Camera	Fujifilm	Instax Mini 50S	September 21, 2010	60 mm ƒ/12.7	1/3 to 1/400	Manual (2 settings)	2× CR2	112.0 × 96.5 × 49.5	275 g (9.7 oz)		
Camera	Fujifilm	Instax Mini 8	November 6, 2012	60 mm ƒ/12.7	1/60	Manual (5 settings)	2× LR6/AA	116 × 118.3 × 68.2	307 g (10.8 oz)		
Camera	Fujifilm	Instax Mini 90	September 20, 2013	60 mm ƒ/12.7	1/8 to 1/400	Manual (13 settings)	1× NP45A	113.4 × 91.9 × 57.2	296 g (10.4 oz)		
Camera	Fujifilm	Instax Mini Hello Kitty	October 23, 2014	60 mm ƒ/12.7	1/60	Manual (5 settings)	2× LR6/AA	169 × 145 × 69	395 g (13.9 oz)		
Camera	Fujifilm	Instax Mini 70	September 29, 2015	60 mm ƒ/12.7	1/2 to 1/400	Manual (9 settings)	2× CR2	99.2 × 113.7 × 53.2	281 g (9.9 oz)		
Camera	Fujifilm	Instax Mini 26	October 19, 2016	60 mm ƒ/12.7	1/3 to 1/400	Manual (2 settings)	2× CR2	108.0 × 139.7 × 146.1	295 g (10.4 oz)		
Camera	Fujifilm	Instax Mini 9	March 28, 2017	60 mm ƒ/12.7	1/60	Manual (5 settings)	2× LR6/AA	116 x 118.3 x 68.2	307 g (10.8 oz)		
Camera	Fujifilm	Instax Mini 8 Minion	July 19, 2017	60 mm ƒ/12.7	1/60	Manual (5 settings)	2× LR6/AA	116 x 118.3 x 68.2	307 g (10.8 oz)		
Camera	Fujifilm	Instax Mini 9 Disney Frozen 2	October 4, 2019	60 mm ƒ/12.7	1/60	Manual (5 settings)	2× LR6/AA	116 x 118.3 x 68.2	307 g (10.8 oz)		
Camera	Fujifilm	Instax Mini 11	March 5, 2020	60 mm ƒ/12.7 glass	1/2 to 1/250	Automatic	2× LR6/AA	107.6 × 121.2 × 67.3	293 g (10.3 oz)		
Camera	Fujifilm	Instax Mini 40	April 7, 2021	60 mm ƒ/12.7	1/2 to 1/250	Automatic	2× LR6/AA	104 × 121 × 65	330 g (11.6 oz)		
Camera	Fujifilm	Instax Mini 7+	September 21, 2021	60 mm ƒ/12.7	1/60	Automatic	4× LR6/AA	101.6 × 127 × 50.82	255 g (8.9 oz)		
Camera	Fujifilm	Instax Mini SE	January 12, 2022	60 mm ƒ/12.7	1/60	Manual (4 settings)	4× LR6/AA	104 × 145 × 55	307 g (10.8 oz)		
Camera	Fujifilm	Instax Mini 12	March 2, 2023	60 mm ƒ/12.7	1/2 to 1/250	Automatic	2× LR6/AA	104 × 66.6 × 122	306 g (10.7 oz)	Features parallax correction function for Close-Up Mode	
Camera	Fujifilm	Instax Mini 99	March 14, 2024	60 mm ƒ/12.7	1.8 to 1/400	Manual (20 settings)	1× NP70S	103.5 × 117.5 × 60.0	340 g (11.9 oz)		
Camera	Fujifilm	Instax Mini 41	April 8, 2025	60 mm ƒ/12.7	1/2 to 1/250	Automatic	2× LR6/AA	104.5 × 122.5 × 67.5	345 g (12.1 oz)		
Camera	Fujifilm	Instax Mini 13	June 25, 2026	60 mm ƒ/12.7	1/2 to 1/250	Automatic	2× LR6/AA	105.5 × 124.7 × 67.6	327 g (11.5 oz)		
Hybrid Camera/Printer	Fujifilm	FinePix PR21	1999	35 mm ƒ/8	1/4 to 1/1000	Automatic	4× AA	113 × 127 × 60	550 g (19.4 oz)	2.3 megapixel digital camera with built–in Instax photo printer	
Hybrid Camera/Printer	Fujifilm	Instax Mini LiPlay	June 2019	28 mm (35-mm equivalent) ƒ/2.0	1/4 to 1/8000	Automatic	Built-in lithium-ion	82.5 x 122.9 x 36.7	255 g	Records sound accessible via QR code printed on photos	
Hybrid Camera/Printer	Fujifilm	Instax Mini Evo	December 2021	28 mm (35-mm equivalent) ƒ/2.0	1/4 to 1/8000	Automatic	Built-in lithium-ion	87 x 122.9 x 36	285 g		
Camera	Polaroid	Polaroid Mio	December 17, 2001	60 mm ƒ/12	1/30 to 1/400	Automatic	2× CR2	117 × 127 × 56	343 g (12.1 oz)		
Camera	Diana	Diana Instant Camera Back	April 2009	N/A	N/A	N/A	2× CR2	N/A	??? g	For use with Diana F+	
Camera	Diana	Diana F+ w/ Instant Camera Back	April 2009	32 mm ƒ/11	∞ to 1/60	Manual	2× CR2	N/A	??? g		
Camera	Polaroid	Polaroid 300	April 28, 2010	60 mm ƒ/12.7	1/60 to 1/400	Manual (4 settings)	4× LR6/AA	119.5 × 121.5 × 70.5	320 g (11.3 oz)	Rebranded Instax Mini 7S	
Camera	Lomo	Lomo'Instant	December 2014	27 mm ƒ/8-f/32	∞ to 1/125	Manual (5 settings)	4× LR03/AAA	141 × 96.3 × 57	??? g	Different design and features such as multiple exposures and bulb mode.	
Camera	Lomo	LC-A + Instant Back	?	Minitar 1 32mm ƒ/2.8	Automatic – ∞ to 1/500	Automatic	LR44 1.5V	?	?	?	
Camera	MiNT	MiNT InstantFlex TL70	July 2015	61mm ƒ/5.6, ƒ/8, ƒ/16, ƒ/22, ƒ/bokeh	1/500 – 1 second, 10 seconds bulb	Automatic	3× AA Batteries	141 × 102 × 80.2	525g	?	
Camera	Leica	Leica Sofort	November 2016	60 mm ƒ/12.7 (34 mm in 35 mm equiv.)	1/400 – 1/8 second, 2 and 10 seconds bulb	Automatic	Lithium–ion	124 × 94 × 58	305 g		
Camera	Lomo	Lomo Instant Automat	November 2016	60mm (35mm equivalent) ƒ/8, ƒ/22	Bulb (maximum 30 seconds), 8s–1/250 (Auto Shooting Mode)	Automatic	2× CR2 + 1× CR1632	119 × 93 × 63	??? g		
Camera	Lomo	Lomo Instant Automat Glass	2017	38mm (21mm equivalent) ƒ/4.5, ƒ/22	Bulb (maximum 30 seconds), 8s–1/250 (Auto Shooting Mode)	Automatic	2× CR2 + 1× CR1632	119 × 93 × 63	??? g		
Camera	SHARPER IMAGE	SHARPER IMAGE Instant Camera	2019	60 mm ƒ/12.7	1/60	Manual	2× LR6/AA	?	?	Heavily re-skinned Instax Mini 9	
Camera	Leica	Leica Sofort 2	November 2023	2.4 mm (28 mm in 35 mm equiv.) ƒ/2-ƒ/16	1/4 – 1/8000 second	Automatic	Lithium–ion	123 × 86 × 44	320 g	Hybrid 4.9 megapixel digital camera with print function	
Printer	Fujifilm	Instax "Cheki" NP–1	2005	N/A			2× CR2	120.5 × 108 × 45	250 g (8.8 oz)	Only released in Japan	
Printer	Fujifilm	Instax Share SP–1	January 2014	N/A			2× CR2	122.5 × 101.6 × 42	253 g (8.9 oz)	Successor to the Pivi	
Printer	Fujifilm	Instax Share SP–2	June 2016	N/A			Rechargeable	131.8 × 89.5 × 40	250 g	Improved resolution and printing speed, reduced noise.	
Printer	Fujifilm	Instax mini Link	October 2019	N/A			Rechargeable	90.3 × 34.6 × 124.5	209 g		
Printer	Fujifilm	Instax mini Link 2	July 2022	N/A			Rechargeable	124.8 x 91.9 x 36.4	209 g		
Printer	Fujifilm	Instax mini link 3	August 2024	N/A			Rechargeable	90 x 37.7 x 125	~ 210g		

== Instax Wide ==
Category	Manufacturer	Model	Release	Lens	Shutter (s)	Focusing	Batteries	Size W×H×D (mm)	Weight (body)	Notes	Image
Camera	Fujifilm	Instax 100	May 1999	95mm ƒ/14	1/64 to 1/200	Manual	4× LR6/AA	171.5 × 91.5 × 119.5	650 g (22.9 oz)	Flash is automatic and cannot be turned off. Pressing the flash button forces the flash to fire.	
Camera	Fujifilm	Instax 500AF	July 1999	95 mm ƒ/12.8	1/8 to 1/125	Automatic (AF)	2× CR123A	174.5 × 76 × 120	655 g (23.1 oz)	Only Instax model with Autofocus. Flash can be turned off.	
Camera	Fujifilm	Instax 200	November 2000	95mm ƒ/14	1/64 to 1/200	Manual	4× LR6/AA	178.5 × 94.5 × 117.5	650 g (22.9 oz)	Flash relocated to the side.	
Camera	Fujifilm	Instax 210	June 2009	95mm ƒ/14	1/64 to 1/200	Manual	4× LR6/AA	178.5 × 94.5 × 117.5	610g (21.5 oz)	Internally slimmed down	
Camera	Fujifilm	Instax Wide 300	September 9, 2014	95mm ƒ/14	1/64 to 1/200	Manual	4× LR6/AA	167.8 × 94.7 × 120.9	612 g (21.5 oz)	Redesign+tripod mount	
Camera	Fujifilm	Instax Wide 400	June 17, 2024	95mm ƒ/14	1/64 to 1/200	Manual	4× LR6/AA	167 × 98 × 123	616 g (21.7 oz)		
Camera	Lomo	Lomo'Instant Wide	Spring 2016	90mm f/8	8 to 1/250 and bulb	Manual 3 zones	4× LR6/AA			PC Sync port	
Camera	MiNT	MiNT InstantKon RF70	May 2019	93mm f/5.6	Manual & Automatic – 1 to 1/500 and bulb	Manual	4× LR6/AA				
Camera	MiNT	MiNT InstantKon RF70 Auto	May 2019	93mm f/5.6	Automatic – 1 to 1/500	Manual					
Film Back	Lomo	Belair Instant Back	March 2014	N/A	N/A	N/A	No	N/A	599 g (21.13 oz)	For use with Belair X 6–12	
Film Back	Lomo	Belair X 6-12+Instant Back	March 2014	ƒ/8-16	1/125 sec. and bulb	N/A	2× LR44	N/A	1400 g (49.4 oz)	Not full–frame Instax	
Film Back	Lomo	LomoGraflok 4×5 Instant Back	October 2020	N/A	N/A	N/A	4x LR6/AA			For use with any 4x5 camera accepting a Graflok back	
Printer	Fujifilm	Instax Link Wide	2022								

== Instax Square ==
=== Instax Square hybrid analog/digital camera / printer ===
Category	Manufacturer	Model	Release	Lens	Shutter (s)	Focusing	Batteries	Size W×H×D (mm)	Weight (body)	Notes	Image
Camera	Lomo	Lomography Lomo'Instant Square Glass	January 2018	95 mm f/10 f/22 glass lens	Auto Mode 8 s – 1/250 s; Bulb Mode up to 30 s	Zones	2× CR2 + 1× CR2025			Lens is 45 mm equivalent angle of view (AOV) in 35 mm full frame format. A separate Wide-Angle Glass Lens Attachment instead gives 21 mm AOV.	
Camera	Fujifilm	Fujifilm Instax Square SQ6	May 2018	66 mm, f/12.6 plastic lens	Programmed electronic shutter release, 1.6 s – 1/400 s	Motor-driven, range of 3	2× CR2/DL CR2 lithium	118.7 x 128.1 x 58.1	393 g	Lens is 32 mm equivalent angle of view (AOV) in 35 mm full frame format.	
Camera	Lomo	Diana Instant Square	December 2018	75mm, f/11, f/19, f/32, f/150	Normal Mode 1/100 s; Bulb Mode unlimited	Zones	4× AAA				
Camera	Fujifilm	Fujifilm Instax Square SQ1	September 2020	66 mm, f/12.6 plastic lens	Programmed electronic shutter release, 1.6 s – 1/400 s	Manual, range of 2	2× CR2 lithium	118.6 x 130.7 x 57.5	390 g (without batteries, strap, and film)	Lacks double exposures, landscape mode, lighten and darken modes, and self-timer found on SQ6. Lens is 32 mm equivalent angle of view (AOV) in 35 mm full frame format.	
Camera	Fujifilm	Fujifilm Instax Square SQ40	June 2023	65.75mm f/12.6	Programmed electronic shutter release 1/2 to 1/400 s; slow synchro for low light	Manual, range of 2	2× CR2 lithium	134.2 × 120.2 × 60.5	453 g		
Hybrid analog/digital camera / printer	Fujifilm	Fujifilm Instax Square SQ10	October 2017	? mm f/2.4	1/29500 s to 1/2 s (Auto), max 10 s in Bulb mode	Programmed AE	NP-50	119 × 47 × 127	450 g	Hybrid analog/digital camera that prints onto Instax paper either instantaneously or after–the–fact. Lens is 28.5 mm equivalent angle of view (AOV) in 35 mm full frame format	
Hybrid analog/digital camera / printer	Fujifilm	Fujifilm Instax Square SQ20	October 2018	? mm f/2.4	1/7500 s to 1/2 s (Auto), max 10 s in Bulb mode	Programmed AE	Built-in	119 × 50 × 127	440 g (including film pack and memory card)	Hybrid analog/digital camera that prints onto Instax paper; includes video recording; has smaller image sensor than SQ10. Lens is 33.4 mm equivalent angle of view (AOV) in 35 mm full frame format	
Printer	Fujifilm	Fujifilm Instax Share SP–3	November 2017	N/A	N/A	N/A	NP-50	116 × 130.5 × 44.4	312 g	Printing resolution: 12.5 dots/mm (318 dpi, 80 μm dot pitch)	

== Instax Pivi ==
Category	Manufacturer	Model	Release	Max Input Resolution	Interface	Batteries	Size W×H×D (mm)	Weight (unit)	Notes	Image
Printer	Fujifilm	Instax Pivi MP–100	2004	3 MP (2048×1536)	IrDA	2× CR2	126.5 × 98 × 29.5	205 g (7.2 oz)	Compatible with IR-100 (USB to IR adapter)	
Printer	Fujifilm	Instax Pivi MP–70	November 2005	3 MP (2048×1536)	IrDA	2× CR2	129 × 100 × 29	210 g (7.4 oz)	Compatible with IR-100 (USB to IR adapter)	
Printer	Fujifilm	Instax Pivi MP–300	June 2006	41 MP (6400×6400) or 1 MB over IrDA	USB; IrDA	2× CR2	146 × 102 × 29	225 g (7.9 oz)	Optional AC adapter	

== See also ==
- List of Zink cameras, printers and paper
