= Instax Mini 11 =

Instant camera

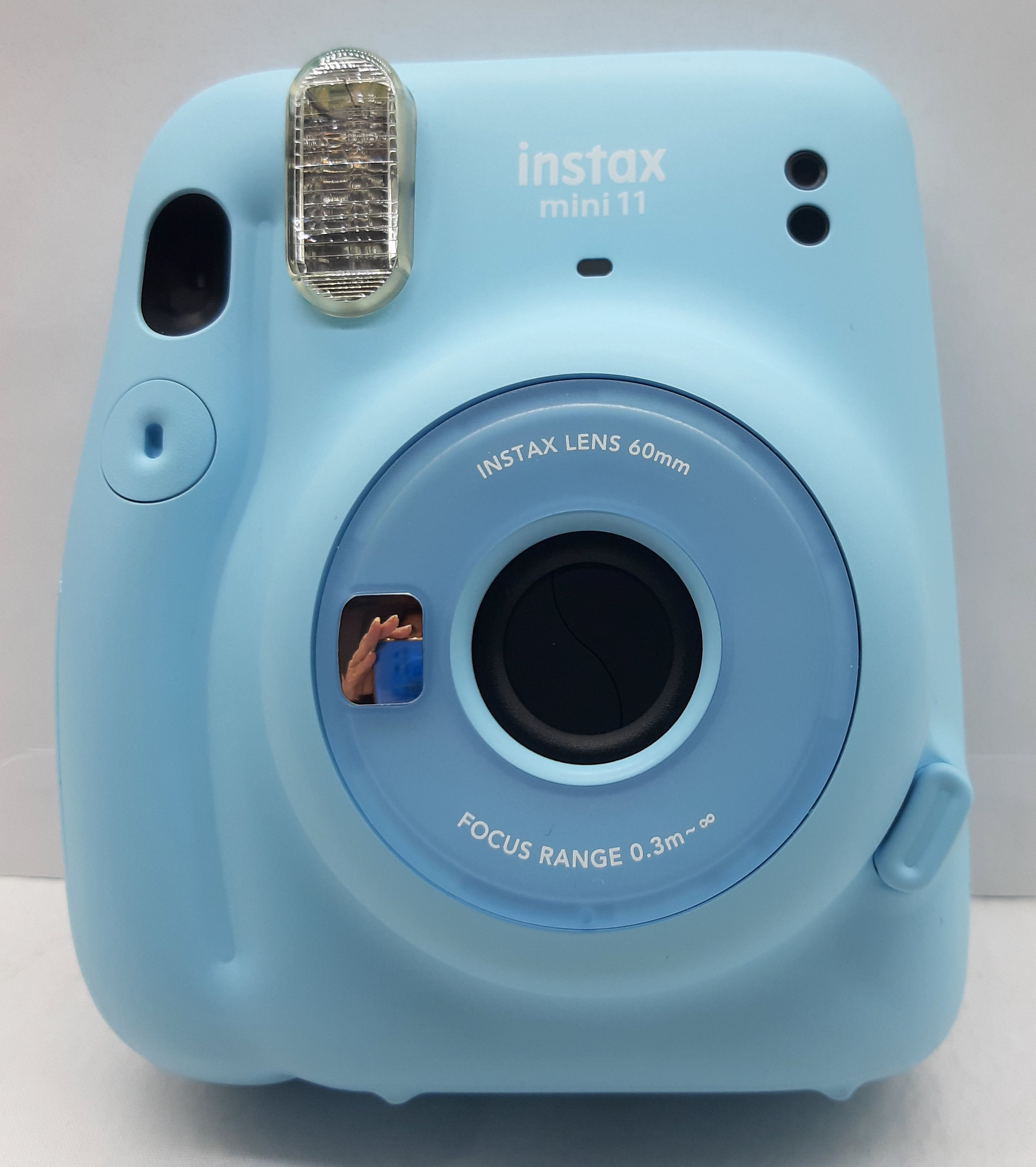

Overview
- Type: Instant camera
- Released: March 5, 2020; 5 years ago

Lens
- Lens: 60 mm (Note: Equivalent angle of view in full frame format differs)
- F-numbers: ƒ/12.7

Sensor/medium
- Film format: Instax Mini
- Film size: 46 mm × 62 mm (1.8 in × 2.4 in)
- Recording medium: Instant film

Focusing
- Focus: Manual, zone focusing: 0.3 m–∞; (selfie mode for 0.3 m to 0.5 m)

Exposure/metering
- Exposure: Automatic

Flash
- Flash: Built-in

Shutter
- Shutter speeds: 1/2 to 1/250 s

Viewfinder
- Viewfinder: Optical
- Viewfinder magnification: 0.37×

General
- Battery: 2xLR6/AA
- Weight: 293g (without batteries, strap, and film)

Chronology
- Predecessor: Mini 9
- Successor: Mini 12

The Instax Mini 11 is an analog instant film camera designed, developed, marketed and sold by Fujifilm. The Instax camera is the successor to the Instax Mini 9 and was released on March 5, 2020.

== Specifications ==
The Fujifilm Instax Mini 11 has a 60 mm ƒ/12.7 lens, similar to other Fujifilm Instax Mini cameras. The camera has a fully automatic exposure system and shutter speeds that vary automatically between ½ and 1/250 s. The lens is made of glass. It also has a selfie mode with a built-in selfie mirror. It operates with two high-power batteries.

== Design ==
The camera has curved edges and has a modern and compact look. It is smaller than the Mini 9 and lighter, and has different material around the lens and interchangeable shutter button stickers in different colors.

The Fujifilm Instax Mini 11 is available in five pastel colors: blush pink, charcoal gray, lilac purple, sky blue, and ice white. A version with design cues taken from K-pop group BTS's single "Butter" is available in a buttery yellow hue and with jewel graphics and heart motifs.

== Instax Mini film ==
The Instax Mini instant film image size is 46 mm × 62 mm (1.8 in × 2.4 in). The prints themselves are 54 mm × 86 mm (2.1 in × 3.4 in). The film is available in white backgrounds as well as black, Blue Marble, Monochrome, Pink Lemonade, Macaron, Rainbow, Confetti and various other backgrounds.

== See also ==
- List of Instax cameras and printers
- Fujifilm Instax Wide 300
- Lomography Lomo'Instant Square Glass
