= List of Zink cameras, printers and paper =

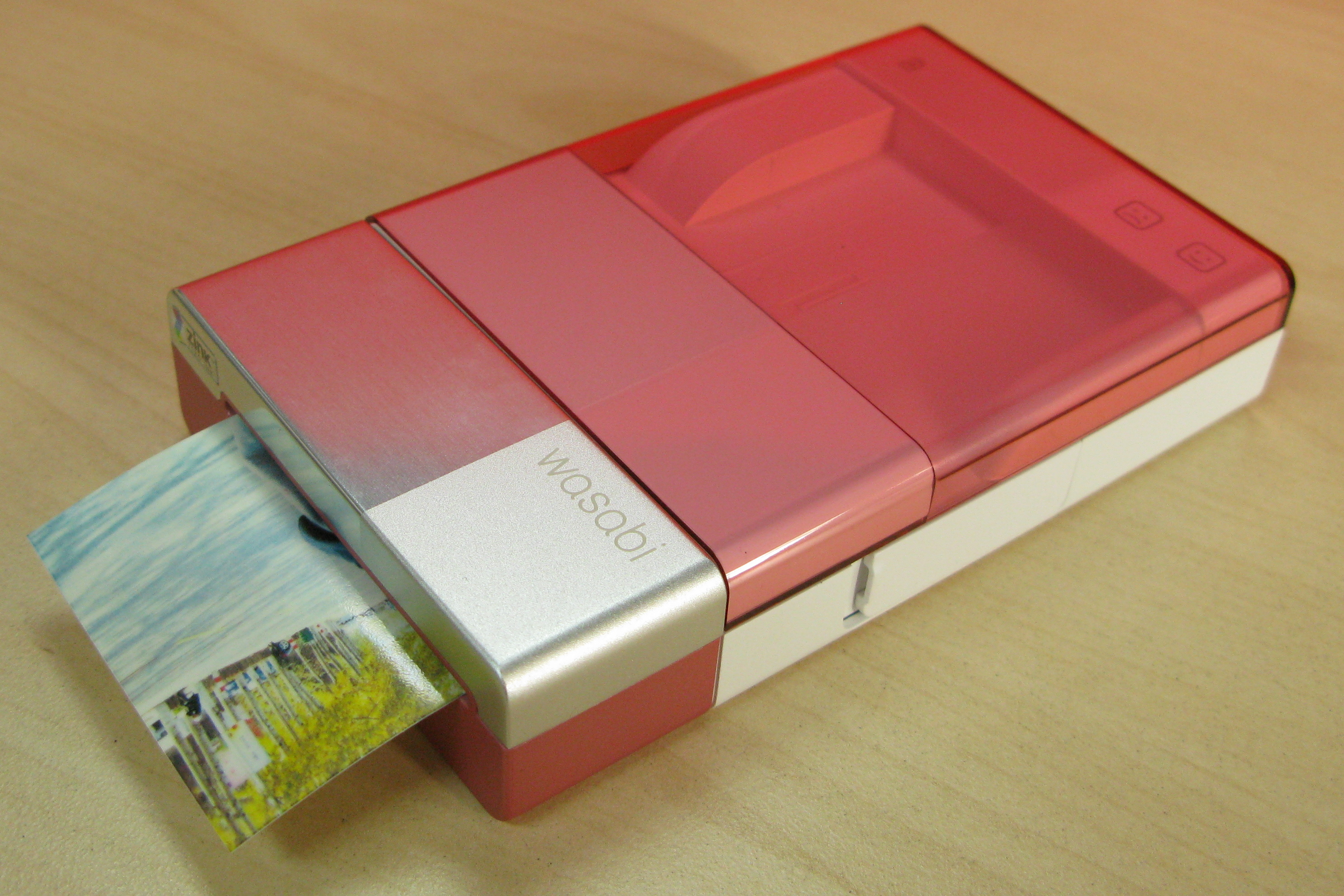
Dell Wasabi (PZ310)

This is a list of cameras, printers and paper for use with the Zink full-color printing technology.

== Zink Paper printers ==
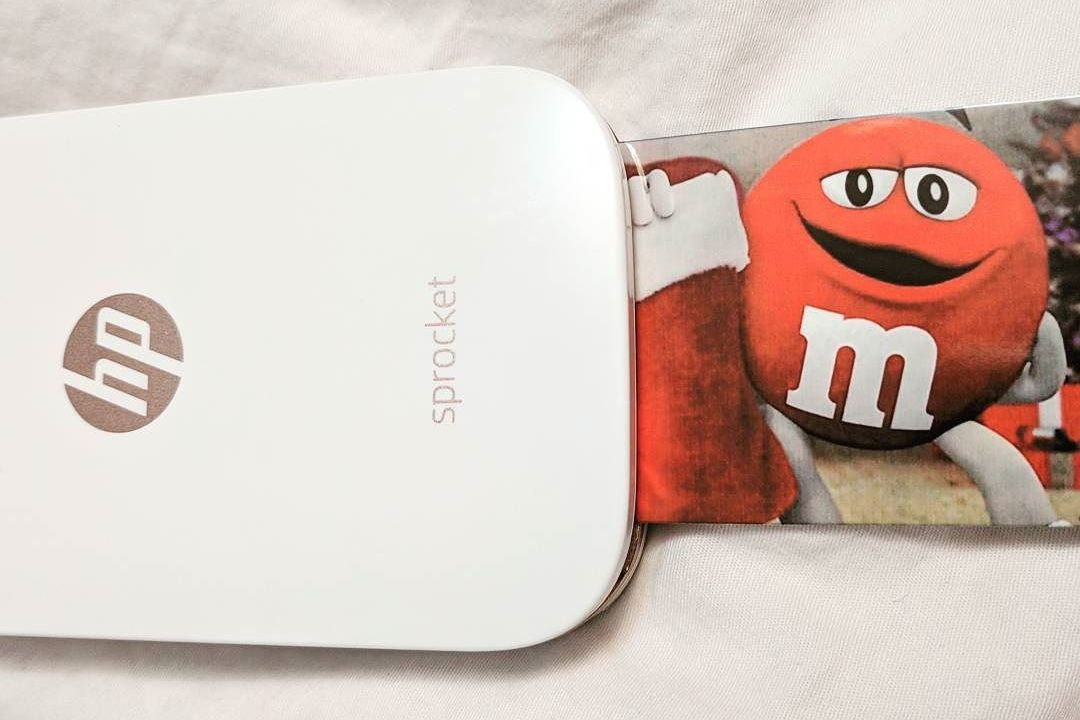
HP Sprocket

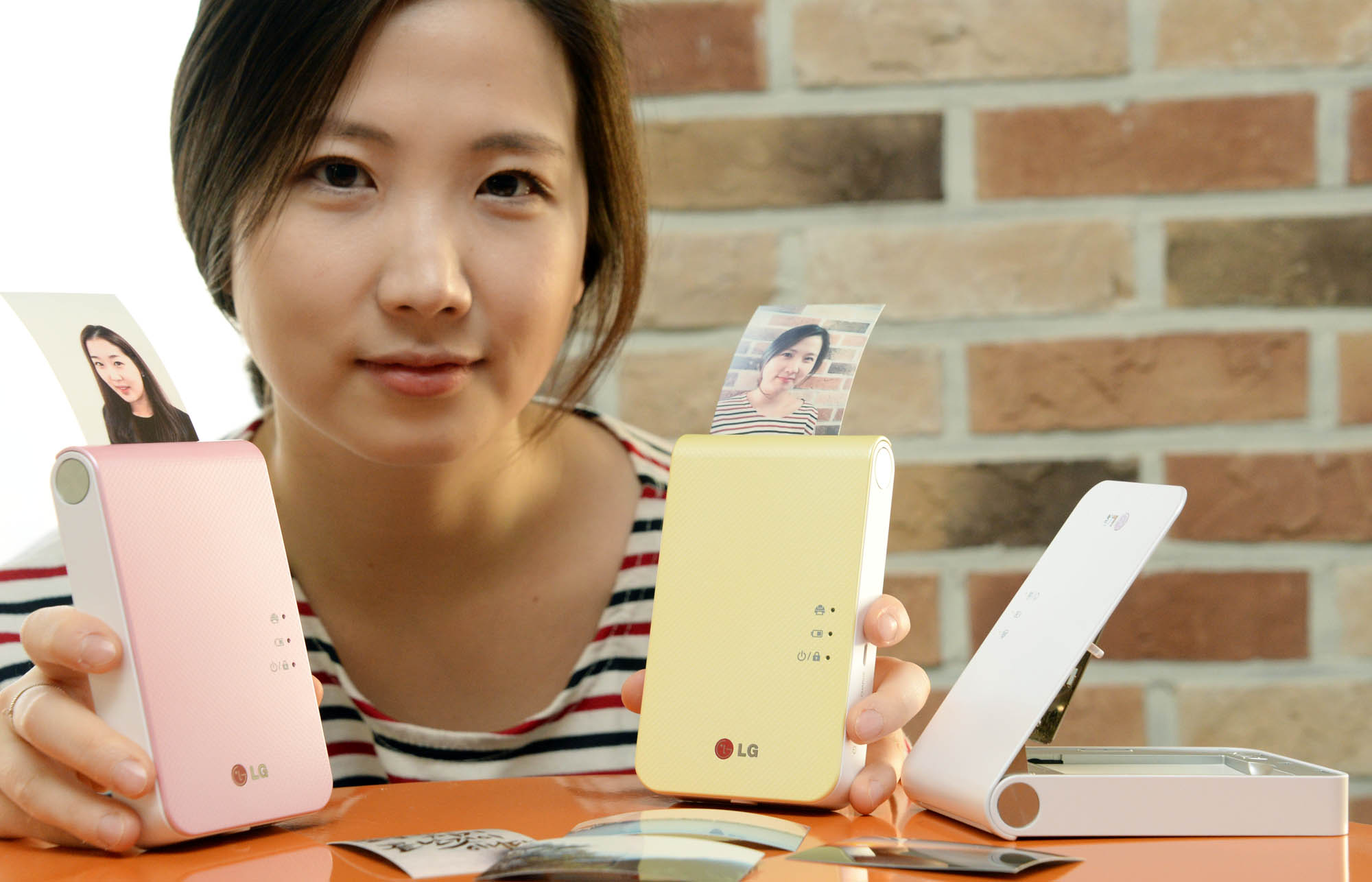
LG Pocket Photo 2 (PD239)

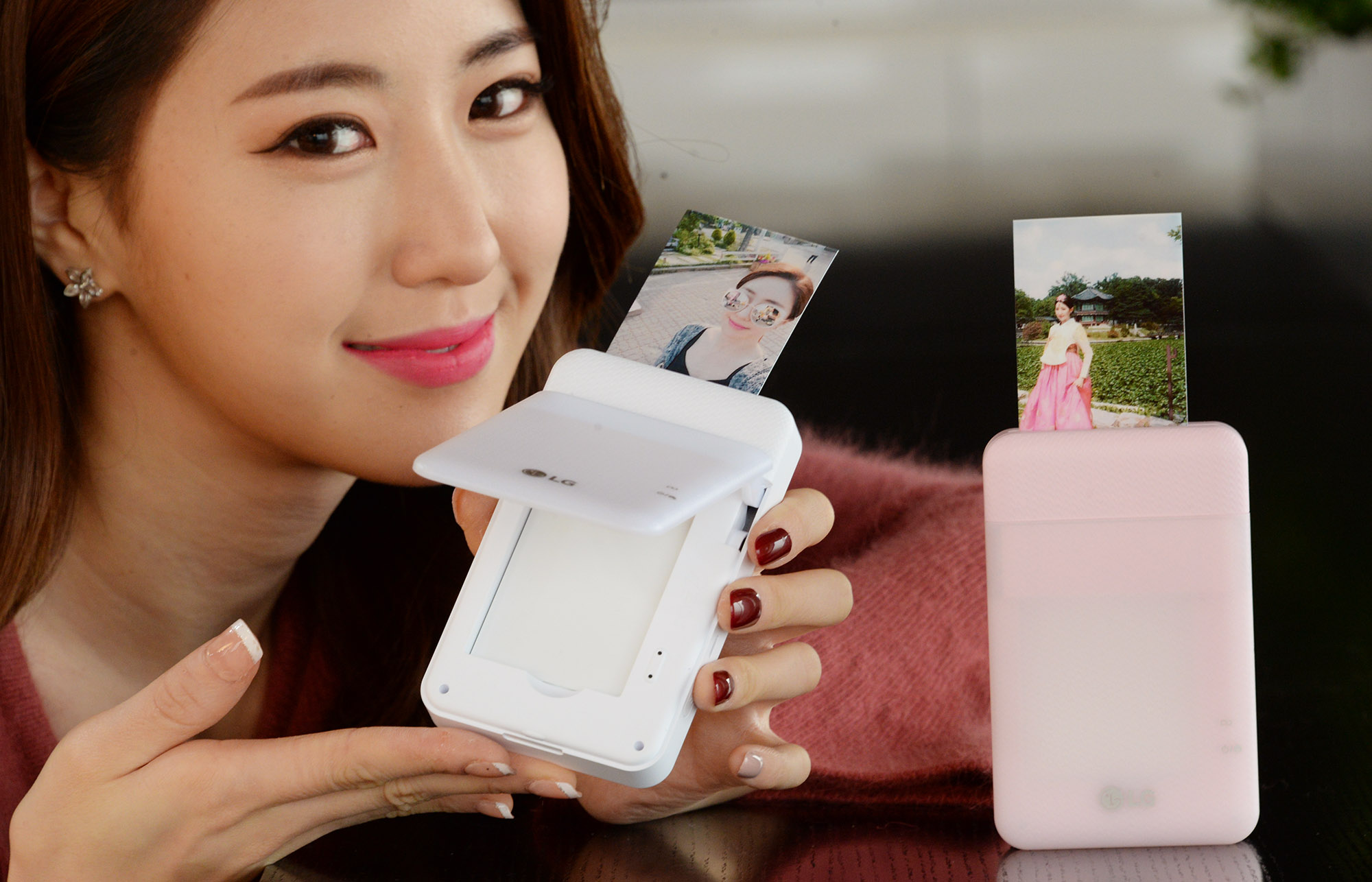
LG Pocket Photo 3 (PD251)

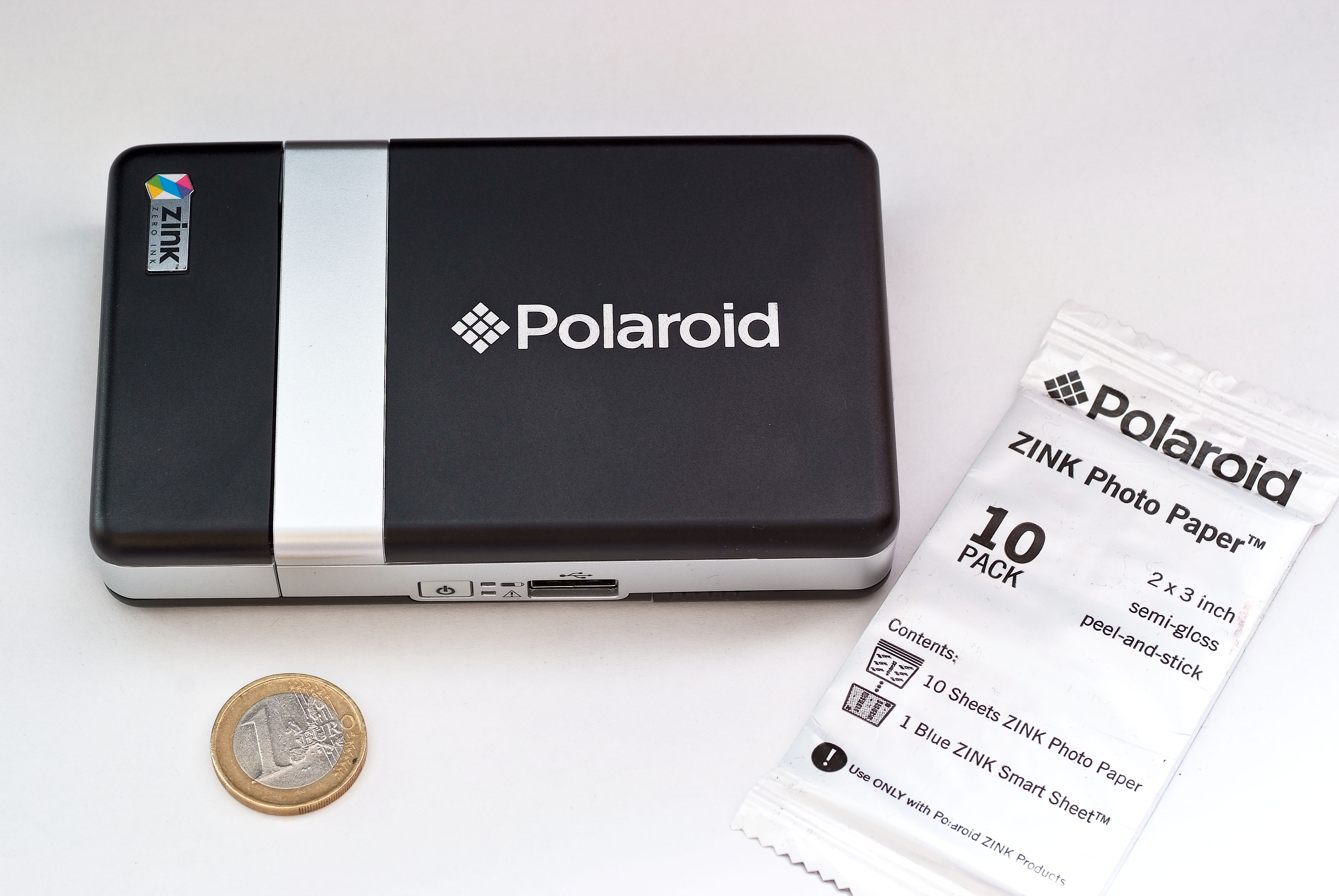
Polaroid PoGo

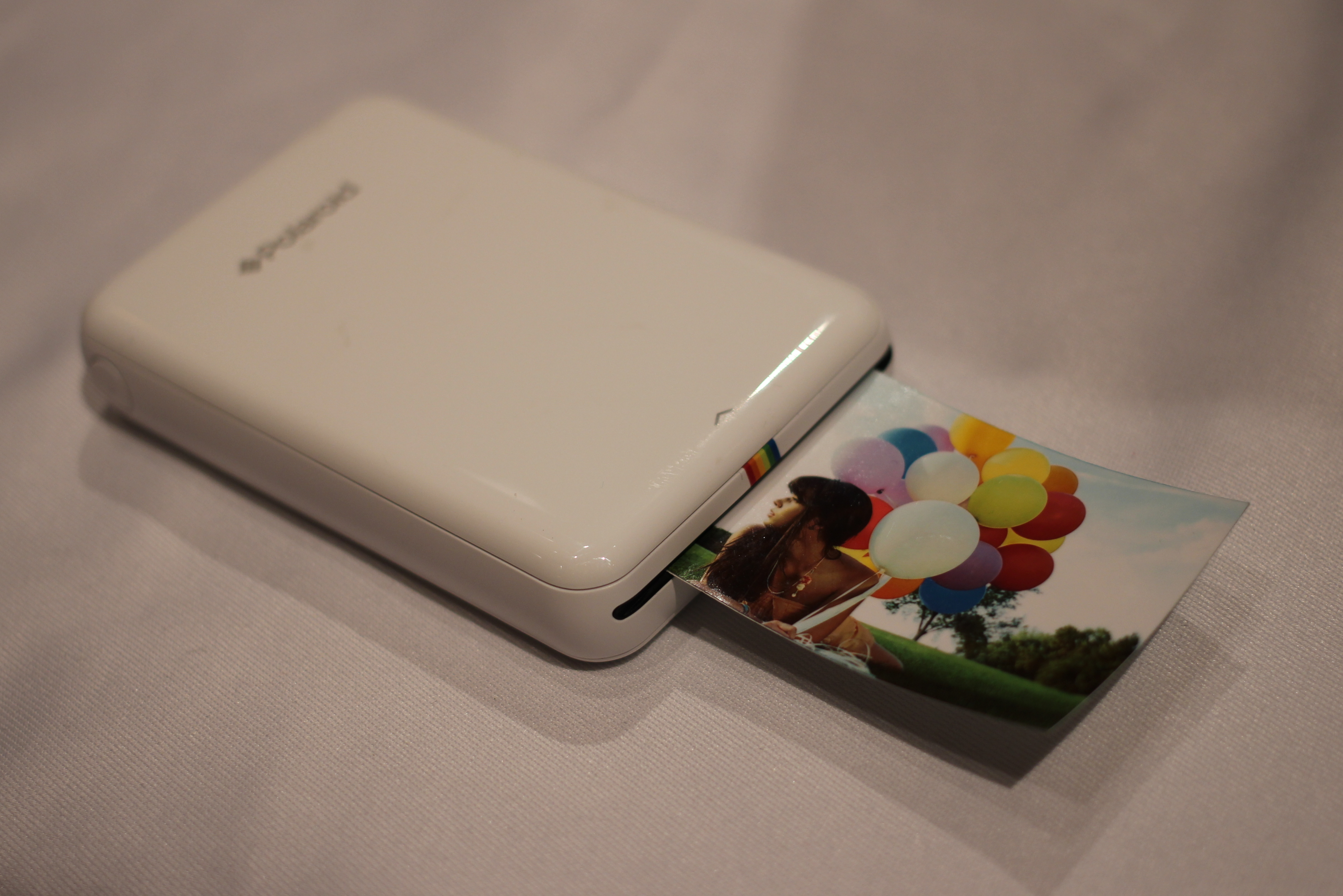
Polaroid Zip

Zink Paper printers print photographs onto mostly 2×3" (about 5×8 cm) sheets of Zink Paper, though some print onto 3×4" (about 8×10 cm) paper, and some print onto 2.3×3.4" (5.8×8.6 cm) paper.

- Dell Wasabi (PZ310)
- Canon IVY (U.S.A.) or Zoemini (Europe) – produces 2×3" prints
- HP Sprocket
- HP Sprocket Plus - produces 2.3×3.4" (5.8×8.6 cm) prints
- HP Sprocket 200
- LG Pocket Photo (PD233)
- LG Pocket Photo 2 (PD239)
- LG Pocket Photo 3 (PD251)
- Lifeprint
- Polaroid Grey Label GL10 (PLDGL10PRINTR) – produces 3×4" prints. Discontinued.
- Polaroid PoGo
  - CZA-10011B
  - CZU-10011B
  - CZA-20011B
- Polaroid Zip Instant Photoprinter (POLMP01)
- Prynt Case (later called Prynt Classic)
- Prynt Pocket
- Brother VC-500W
- Huawei Pocket Photo Printer
- Mi Portable Photo Printer

== Combined digital cameras and Zink printers ==
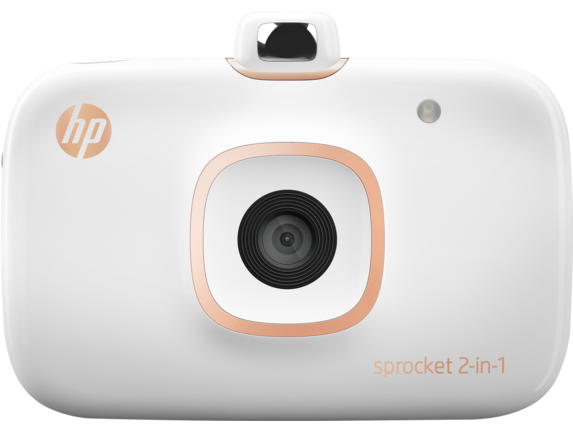
HP Sprocket 2-in-1 camera-printer

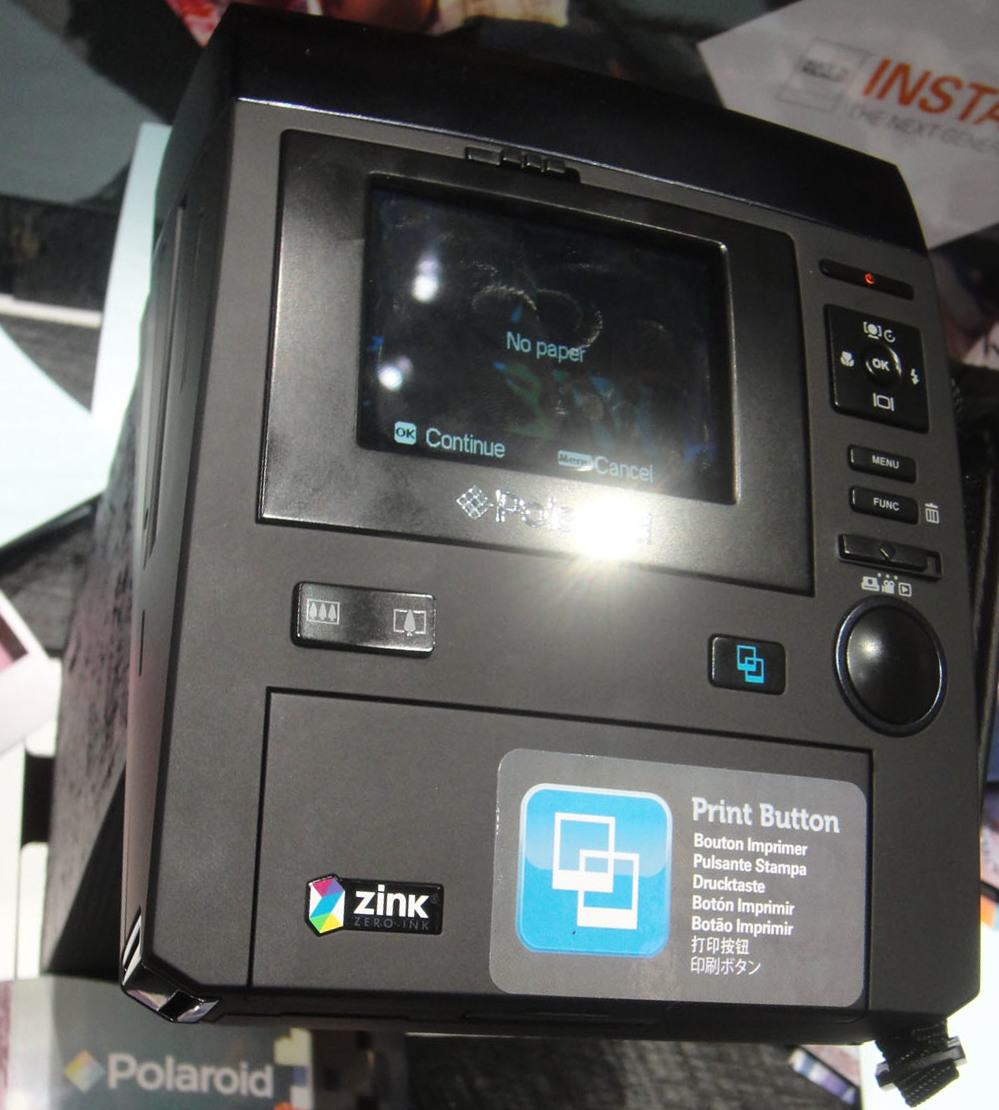
Polaroid Z340

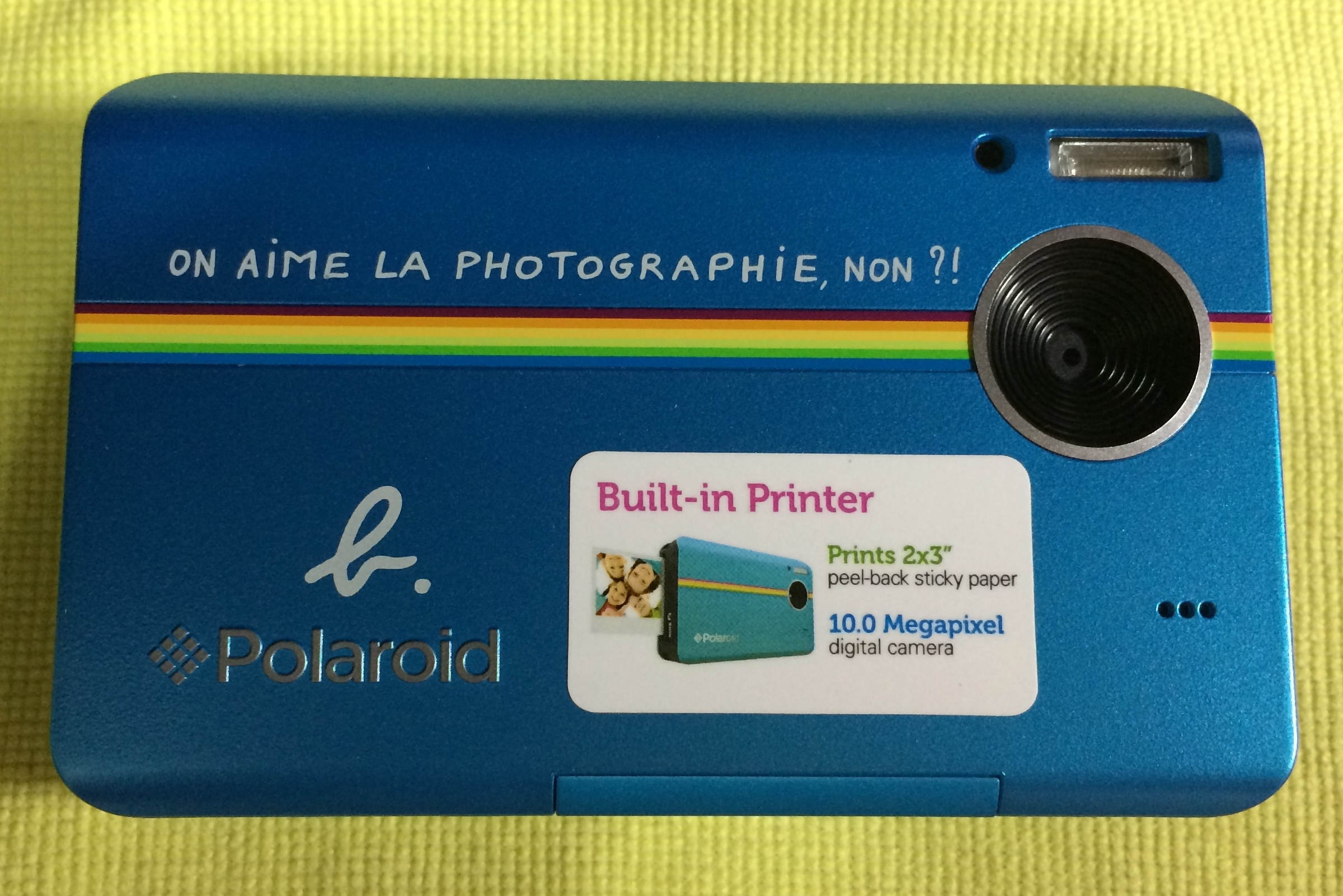
Polaroid Z2300

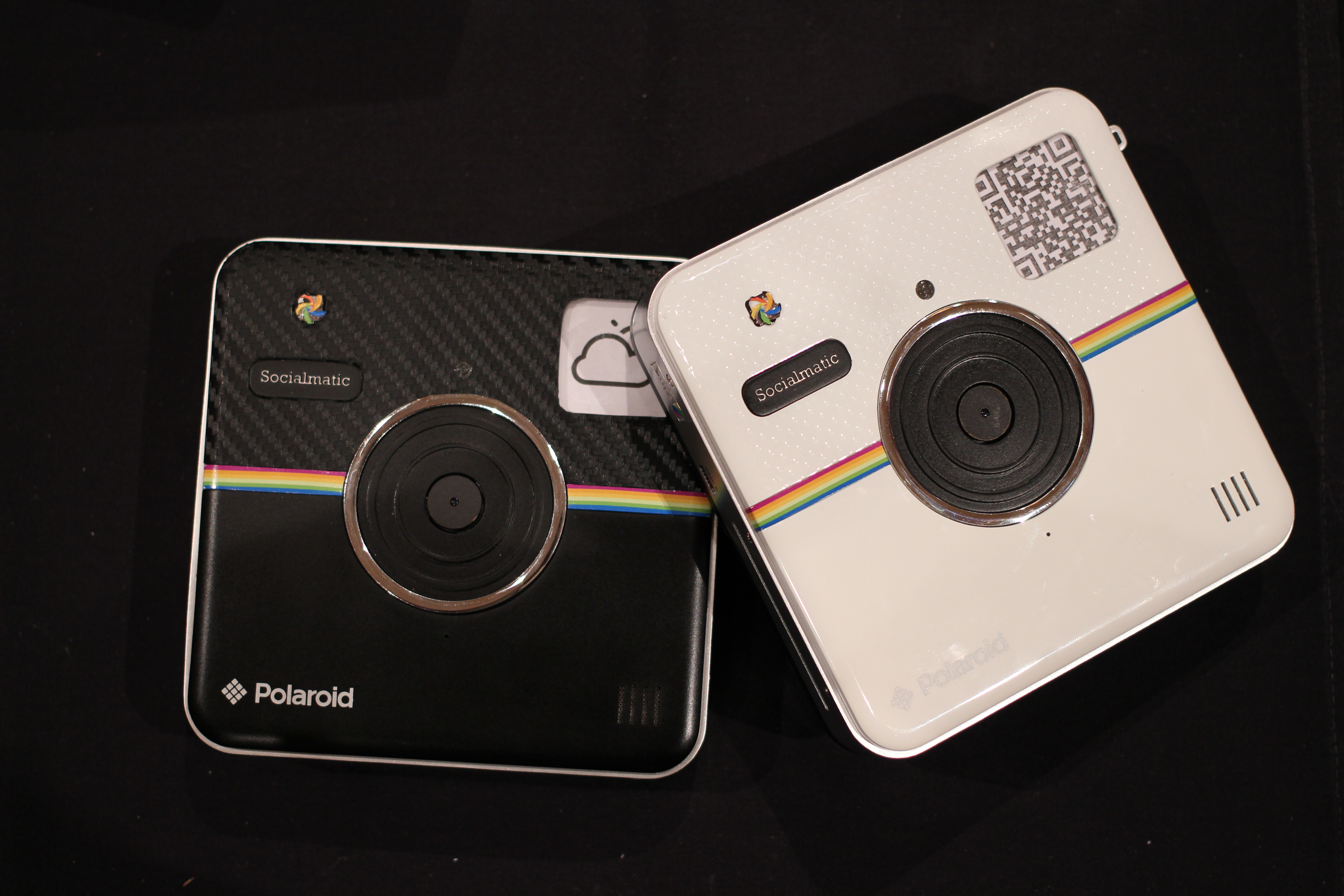
Polaroid Socialmatic

- HP Sprocket Two-in-one / 2-in-1 – The combined camera-printer version of the Sprocket.
- Kodak Printomatic – Instant Print 10 MP Digital Camera that produces 2×3" sticky-backed prints
- Kodak Smile – Instant Print 10 MP Digital Camera with LCD viewfinder that produces 2×3" sticky-backed prints
- Kodak Smile Classic – Instant Print Digital Camera that produces 3.25×4.5" sticky-backed prints
- Polaroid PoGo (Note: The combined Polaroid digital camera / printers should not be confused with the analogue Polaroid Pic-300 instant camera and PIF-300 instant film, which is a rebranded Fujifilm Instax Mini 7s camera and Fujifilm Instax Mini film, respectively.) (CZA-05300) – a 5 MP digital camera that produces 2×3" prints
- Polaroid PIC-1000 – a 12 MP digital camera that produces 3×4" prints
- Polaroid Z340 – a 14 MP digital camera that produces 3×4" prints
- Polaroid Z2300 Digital Instant Print Camera (POLZ2300) – a 10 MP digital camera that produces 2×3" prints
- Tomy Xiao (TIP-521) – a 5 MP digital camera that produces 2×3" prints
- Polaroid Socialmatic – a 14 MP digital camera with 4.5" LCD screen, produces 2×3" prints
- Polaroid Snap Instant Digital Camera (POLSP01) – a 10 MP digital camera that produces 2×3" prints
- Polaroid Snap Plus – a 13 MP digital camera with 3.5" LCD screen, produces 2×3" prints.
- Polaroid Pop (announced at CES 2017) – 3.5×4.25" format

== Zink zRoll printers ==
Stylised as ZINK hAppy. Marketed as a "smart app printer". Launched in 2013.

- Zink Happy from Zink Imaging
- Zink Happy+ from Zink Imaging

== Paper formats ==
- Zink Paper
  - Zink Photo Paper (POLZPPxxx)† – 2×3" (about 5×7.6 cm) sheets
  - Zink Photo Paper (POLZ3X4xx) – 3×4" (about 8×10 cm) sheets
  - Premium Zink Photo Paper (POLZ2X3xx) – 2×3" sheets
  - Premium Zink Rainbow Photo Paper (POLZ2X3xxRB) – 2×3" sheets
  - HP Sprocket Photo Paper – 2×3" (5×7.6 cm) sheets
  - HP Sprocket Plus Photo Paper – 2.3×3.4" (5.8×8.7 cm) sheets
- Zink zRoll - available in a variety of widths

† The 'x' in the model represents the number of sheets of paper in the pack.
