= Tying (commerce) =

Commerce practice

Tying (informally, product tying) is the practice of selling one product or service as a mandatory addition to the purchase of a different product or service. In legal terms, a tying sale makes the sale of one good (the tying good) to the de facto customer (or de jure customer) conditional on the purchase of a second distinctive good (the tied good). Tying is often illegal when the products are not naturally related. It is related to but distinct from freebie marketing, a common (and legal) method of giving away (or selling at a substantial discount) one item to ensure a continual flow of sales of another related item.

Some kinds of tying, especially by contract, have historically been regarded as anti-competitive practices. The basic idea is that consumers are harmed by being forced to buy an undesired good (the tied good) in order to purchase a good they actually want (the tying good), and so would prefer that the goods be sold separately. The company doing this bundling may have a significantly large market share so that it may impose the tie on consumers, despite the forces of market competition. The tie may also harm other companies in the market for the tied good, or who sell only single components.

One effect of tying can be that low quality products achieve a higher market share than would otherwise be the case.

Tying may also be a form of price discrimination: people who use more razor blades, for example, pay more than those who just need a one-time shave. Though this may improve overall welfare, by giving more consumers access to the market, such price discrimination can also transfer consumer surpluses to the producer. Tying may also be used with or in place of patents or copyrights to help protect entry into a market, discouraging innovation.

Tying is often used when the supplier makes one product that is critical to many customers. By threatening to withhold that key product unless others are also purchased, the supplier can increase sales of less necessary products.

In the United States, most states have laws against tying, which are enforced by state governments. In addition, the U.S. Department of Justice enforces federal laws against tying through its Antitrust Division.

== Types ==
Horizontal tying is the practice of requiring consumers to pay for an unrelated product or service together with the desired one. A hypothetical example would be for Bic to sell its pens only with Bic lighters. (However, offering a limited free item with another purchase as a promotion by a company does not constitute horizontal tying.)

Vertical tying is the practice of requiring customers to purchase related products or services together, from the same company. For example, a company might mandate that its automobiles could only be serviced by its own dealers. In an effort to curb this, many jurisdictions require that warranties not be voided by outside servicing; for example, see the Magnuson-Moss Warranty Act in the United States.

== In United States law ==
Certain tying arrangements are illegal in the United States under both the Sherman Antitrust Act, and Section 3 of the Clayton Act. A tying arrangement is defined as "an agreement by a party to sell one product but only on the condition that the buyer also purchases a different (or tied) product, or at least agrees he will not purchase the product from any other supplier." Tying may be the action of several companies as well as the work of just one firm. Success on a tying claim typically requires proof of four elements: (1) two separate products or services are involved; (2) the purchase of the tying product is conditioned on the additional purchase of the tied product; (3) the seller has sufficient market power in the market for the tying product; (4) a not insubstantial amount of interstate commerce in the tied product market is affected.

For at least three decades, the Supreme Court defined the required "economic power" to include just about any departure from perfect competition, going so far as to hold that possession of a copyright or even the existence of a tie itself gave rise to a presumption of economic power. The Supreme Court has since held that a plaintiff must establish the sort of market power necessary for other antitrust violations in order to prove sufficient "economic power" necessary to establish a per se tie. More recently, the Court has eliminated any presumption of market power based solely on the fact that the tying product is patented or copyrighted.

In recent years, changing business practices surrounding new technologies have put the legality of tying arrangements to the test. Although the Supreme Court still considers some tying arrangements as per se illegal, the Court actually uses a rule-of-reason analysis, requiring an analysis of foreclosure effects and an affirmative defense of efficiency justifications.

=== Apple products ===
The tying of Apple products is an example of commercial tying that has caused recent controversy. When Apple initially released the iPhone on June 29, 2007, it was sold exclusively with AT&T (formerly Cingular) contracts in the United States. To enforce this exclusivity, Apple employed a type of software lock that ensured the phone would not work on any network besides AT&T's. Related to the concept of bricking, any user who tried to unlock or otherwise tamper with the locking software ran the risk of rendering their iPhone permanently inoperable. This caused complaints among many consumers, as they were forced to pay an additional early termination fee of $175 if they wanted to unlock the device safely for use on a different carrier. Other companies such as Google complained that tying encourages a more closed-access-based wireless service. Many questioned the legality of the arrangement, and in October 2007 a class-action lawsuit was filed against Apple, claiming that its exclusive agreement with AT&T violates California antitrust law. The suit was filed by the Law Office of Damian R. Fernandez on behalf of California resident Timothy P. Smith, and ultimately sought to have an injunction issued against Apple to prevent it from selling iPhones with any kind of software lock.

In July 2010, federal regulators clarified the issue when they determined it was lawful to unlock (or in other terms, "jail break") the iPhone, declaring that there was no basis for copyright law to assist Apple in protecting its restrictive business model. Jail breaking is removing operating system or hardware restrictions imposed on an iPhone (or other device). If done successfully, this allows one to run any application on the phone they choose, including applications not authorized by Apple. Apple told regulators that modifying the iPhone operating system leads to the creation of an infringing derivative work that is protected by copyright law. This means that the license on the operating system forbids software modification. However, regulators agreed that modifying an iPhone's firmware/operating system to enable it to run an application that Apple has not approved is undoubtedly fair use.

=== Microsoft products ===
Another prominent case involving a tying claim was United States v. Microsoft. By some accounts, Microsoft ties together Microsoft Windows, Internet Explorer, Windows Media Player, Outlook Express and Microsoft Office. The United States claimed that the bundling of Internet Explorer (IE) to sales of Windows 98, making IE difficult to remove from Windows 98 (e.g., not putting it on the "Remove Programs" list), and designing Windows 98 to work "unpleasantly" with Netscape Navigator constituted an illegal tying of Windows 98 and IE. Microsoft's counterargument was that a web browser and a mail reader are simply part of an operating system, included with other personal computer operating systems, and the integration of the products was technologically justified. Just as the definition of a car has changed to include things that used to be separate products, such as speedometers and radios, Microsoft claimed the definition of an operating system has changed to include their formerly separate products. The United States Court of Appeals for the District of Columbia Circuit rejected Microsoft's claim that Internet Explorer was simply one facet of its operating system, but the court held that the tie between Windows and Internet Explorer should be analyzed deferentially under the Rule of Reason. The U.S. government claim settled before reaching final resolution.

As to the tying of Office, parallel cases against Microsoft brought by State Attorneys General included a claim for harm in the market for office productivity applications. The Attorneys General abandoned this claim when filing an amended complaint. The claim was revived by Novell where they alleged that manufacturers of computers ("OEMs") were charged less for their Windows bulk purchases if they agreed to bundle Office with every PC sold than if they gave computer purchasers the choice whether or not to buy Office along with their machines—making their computer prices less competitive in the market. The Novell litigation has since settled.

Microsoft has also tied its software to the third-party Android mobile operating system, by requiring manufacturers that license patents it claims covers the OS and smartphones to ship Microsoft Office Mobile and Skype applications on the devices.

== Anti-tying provision of the Bank Holding Company Act ==
In 1970, Congress enacted section 106 of the Bank Holding Company Act Amendments of 1970 (BHCA), the anti-tying provision, which is codified at 12 U.S.C. § 1972. The statute was designed to prevent banks, whether large or small, state or federal, from imposing anticompetitive conditions on their customers. Tying is an antitrust violation, but the Sherman and Clayton Acts did not adequately protect borrowers from being required to accept conditions to loans issued by banks, and section 106 was specifically designed to apply to and remedy such bank misconduct.

Banks are allowed to take measures to protect their loans and to safeguard the value of their investments, such as requiring security or guaranties from borrowers. The statute exempts so-called “traditional banking practices” from its per se illegality, and thus its purpose is not so much to limit banks' lending practices, as it is to ensure that the practices used are fair and competitive. A majority of claims brought under the BHCA are denied. Banks still have quite a bit of leeway in fashioning loan agreements, but when a bank clearly steps over the bounds of propriety, the plaintiff is compensated with treble damages.

At least four regulatory agencies including the Federal Reserve Board oversee the activities of banks, their holding companies, and other related depository institutions. While each type of depository institution has a “primary regulator”, the nation's “dual banking” system allows concurrent jurisdiction among the different regulatory agencies. With respect to the anti-tying provision, the Fed takes the preeminent role in relation to the other financial institution regulatory agencies, which reflects that it was considered the least biased (in favor of banks) of the regulatory agencies when section 106 was enacted.

== In European Law ==
Tying is the "practice of a supplier of one product, the tying product, requiring a buyer also to buy a second product, the tied product". The tying of a product can take various forms, that of contractual tying where a contract binds the buyer to purchase both products together, refusal to supply until the buyer agrees to purchase both products, withdrawal or withholding of a guarantee where the dominant seller will not provide the benefit of guarantee until the seller accepts to purchase that party's product, technical tying occurs when the products of the dominant party are physically integrated and making impossible to buy the one without the other and bundling where two products are sold in the same package with one price. These practises are prohibited under Article 101(1)(e) and Article 102(2)(d) and may amount to an infringement of the statute if other conditions are satisfied. However, it is noteworthy that the Court is willing to find an infringement beyond those listed in Article 102(2)(d), see Tetra Pak v Commission.

== Enforcement under European law ==
The Guidance on Article 102 Enforcement Priorities sets out in which circumstances it will be appropriate taking actions against tying practices. First, it must be established whether the accused undertaking has a dominant position in the tying or tied product market. Subsequently, the next step is to determine whether the dominant undertaking tied two distinct products. This is important as two identical products cannot be considered tied under Article 102(2)(d) formulation that states products will be considered tied if they have no connects ‘by their nature or commercial usage’. This arises problems in the legal definition of what will amount to tying in scenarios of selling cars with tires or selling a car with a radio. Hence, the Commission provides guidance on this issue by citing the judgement in Microsoft and states that "two products are distinct if, in the absence of tying or bundling, a substantial number of customers would purchase or would have purchased the tying product without also buying the tied product from the same supplier, thereby allowing stand-alone production for both the tying and the tied product". Next issue is whether the customer was coerced to purchase both the tying and the tied products as Article 102(2)(d) suggests: ‘making the conclusion of contracts subject to acceptance by the other parties of supplementary obligations’. In situations of contractual stipulation, it is clear that the test will be satisfied; for an example of a non-contractual tying see Microsoft. Furthermore, for an undertaking to be deemed anti-competitive is whether the tie is capable of having foreclosure effect. Some examples of tying practices having an anti-competitive foreclosure effect in case law are the IBM, Eurofix-Bauco v Hilti, Telemarketing v CLT, British Sugar and Microsoft. Subsequently, the defence available for the dominant undertaking is that it can provide that tying is objectively justified or enhances efficiency and the commission is willing to consider claims that are tying may result in economic efficiency in production or distribution that will bring benefit to the consumers.

== See also ==
- Complementary good
- Iunctim
- Loss leader
- The OSx86 Project or 'Hackintosh', breaking the tie Apple holds between its hardware and Mac OS X to run the operating system on non-Apple hardware.
- Product bundling
- Product churning
- Vendor lock-in
- Digital rights management
- Tying of the iPhone to AT&T

== Bibliography ==
- Donald Turner, Tying Arrangements Under the Antitrust Laws, 72 Harv. L. Rev. 50 (1958);
- George J. Stigler, A Note On Block Booking, 1963 Supreme Court Review 152;
- Kenneth Dam, Fortner Enterprises v. United States Steel: Neither a Borrower Nor A Lender Be, 1969 S. Ct. Rev. 1;
- Timothy D. Naegele, Are All Bank Tie-Ins Illegal?, 154 Bankers Magazine 46 (1971);
- Richard A. Posner, Antitrust: An Economic Perspective, 171-84 (1976);
- Joseph Bauer, A Simplified Approach to Tying Arrangements: A Legal and Economic Analysis, 33 Vanderbilt Law Review 283 (1980);
- Richard Craswell, Tying Requirements in Competitive Markets: The Consumer Protection Rationale, 62 Boston University L. Rev. 661 (1982);
- Roy Kenney and Benjamin Klein, The Economics of Block Booking, 26 J. Law & Economics 497 (1983);
- Timothy D. Naegele, The Anti-Tying Provision: Its Potential Is Still There, 100 Banking Law Journal 138 (1983);
- Victor Kramer, The Supreme Court and Tying Arrangements: Antitrust As History, 69 Minnesota L. Rev. 1013 (1985);
- Benjamin Klein and Lester Saft, The Law and Economics of Franchise Tying Contracts, 28 J. Law and Economics 245 (1985);
- Alan Meese, Tying Meets The New Institutional Economics: Farewell to the Chimera of Forcing, 146 U. Penn. L. Rev. 1 (1997);
- Christopher Leslie, Unilaterally Imposed Tying Arrangements and Antitrust's Concerted Action Requirement, 60 Ohio St. L.J. 1773 (1999);
- John Lopatka and William Page, The Dubious Search For Integration in the Microsoft Trial, 31 Conn. L. Rev. 1251 (1999);
- Alan Meese, Monopoly Bundling in Cyberspace: How Many Products Does Microsoft Sell?, 44 Antitrust Bull. 65 (1999);
- Keith N. Hylton and Michael Salinger, Tying Law and Policy: A Decision-Theoretic Approach, 69 Antitrust L. J. 469 (2001);
- Michael D. Whinston, Exclusivity and Tying in U.S. v. Microsoft: What We Know, and Don't Know, 15 Journal of Economic Perspectives, 63-80 (2001);
- Christopher Leslie, Cutting Through Tying Theory with Occam's Razor: A Simple Explanation of Tying Arrangements, 78 Tul. L. Rev. 727 (2004); and
- Timothy D. Naegele, The Bank Holding Company Act's Anti-Tying Provision: 35 Years Later, 122 Banking Law Journal 195 (2005).
