= Fujifilm Instax Wide 300 =

Instant camera

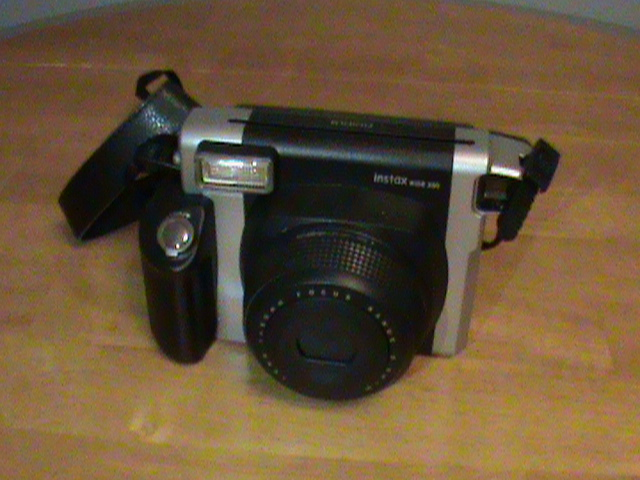

Overview
- Type: Instant camera
- Released: September 9, 2014; 12 years ago
- Intro price: £110 GBP $148 USD

Lens
- Lens: 95 mm (Note: Equivalent angle of view in full frame format differs)
- F-numbers: ƒ/14

Sensor/medium
- Film format: Instax Wide
- Film size: 62 × 99 mm
- Film speed: ISO 800/30°
- Recording medium: Instant film

Focusing
- Focus: Manual, zone focusing: 0.9–3 m; 3 m–∞; 0.4 m with close-up lens accessory

Exposure/metering
- Exposure: Automatic
- Exposure bracketing: ± 2/3 EV

Flash
- Flash: Built-in

Shutter
- Shutter speeds: 1/64 to 1/200 s

Viewfinder
- Viewfinder: Optical
- Viewfinder magnification: 0.37×

General
- Battery: 4 x AA/LR6 batteries (6 V)
- Dimensions: 167.8×94.7×120.9 mm (6.61×3.73×4.76 in)
- Weight: 612 g (21.6 oz) (without battery, strap, film pack, and close up lens)

Chronology
- Predecessor: Wide 210
- Successor: Wide 400

The Fujifilm Instax Wide 300 is an analog instant camera from Fujifilm that uses Instax Wide instant film. It has a moderately wide-angle lens with some manually selectable fixed focus zones and a fixed aperture.

== Details ==
The Instax Wide 300 has a 95 mm prime lens with plastic optics and a fixed aperture of ƒ/14. A focal length of 95 mm in this format translates to "a moderate wide angle field of view that's fine for snapshots and landscapes alike." The lens is retractable and motor driven.

The lens ring is twisted to switch between two focus zones: near focus (0.9 to 3 m) and far focus (3 m to infinity). A separate plastic snap-on close-up lens that enables focus as close as 0.4 m is included. The close-up lens attachment has a plastic convex mirror to assist in taking selfies and "a plastic arm that sits in front of the fixed optical viewfinder to show you where the center of the frame is when focusing close; because the lens is offset from the viewfinder, parallax comes into play in the close focus range."

It has a built-in electronic flash. The camera automatically decides if flash is required or not. The automatic flash optimizes the lighting according to subject distance.

A rear liquid-crystal display indicates how many prints are left and the setting of the only rear controls: a lighten-darken (exposure compensation) toggle and a button that forces the flash to fire.

There is a tripod socket on the underside.

== Critique ==
Reviewers have commented on the camera being large (given it has to accommodate a large film pack), significantly larger than most DSLRs. The viewfinder is small and "offers a narrower view than what the lens is actually seeing." The camera automatically controls the use of the flash, and you cannot control the switch of the flash by yourself. The camera does not offer multiple or long exposures or other manual exposure controls apart from the lighten-darken toggle. It has no self timer. The weight of this camera makes it unsuitable for taking selfies, even if a selfie mirror can be installed.

== Comparison with other Fujifilm Instax Wide models ==
The 300 is the successor to the Fujifilm Instax Wide 210, which was released in 2009. In comparison, the 300 is smaller but less ergonomically designed, and the viewfinder smaller. The 300 has the addition of a tripod mount.

The discontinued Fujifilm Instax 500AF, released in 1999, had autofocus, a self timer, focusing distance from 0.6 m to infinity, shutter speeds of 1/8 to 1/125 s, a fixed aperture of ƒ/12.8, and was powered by two lithium CR123A batteries.

== See also ==
- List of Instax cameras and printers
- Lomography Lomo'Instant Square Glass
