= MiNT Camera =

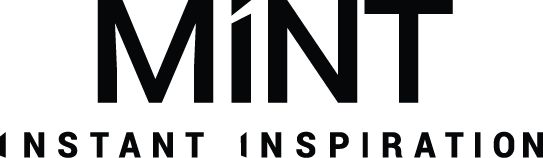
- Native name: MiNT Camera
- Type: Private
- Industry: instant and film photography
- Founded: 2009
- Headquarters: Hong Kong
- Area served: worldwide
- Products: instant cameras, film cameras, accessories, refurbishing & repair services
- Website: mint-camera.com

MiNT Camera is a company specializing in instant cameras and its accessories. Founded in 2009, it provides products and services related to instant photography. MiNT Camera has partnered with Impossible Project, now Polaroid, a manufacturer of instant photographic materials. MiNT is a well-established player in the instant photo market.

In 2015, MiNT Camera released the InstantFlex TL70, a twin lens reflex instant camera that uses Fuji Instax mini film. In 2019, they introduced the InstantKon RF70, a first of its kind Leica style rangefinder camera that uses Instax wide film. Four years later in 2023, they introduced another twin lens camera, the TL70 Plus, that uses Instax square film. The Rollei 35AF became available to pre-order in September 2024.

== History ==
MiNT first started as an online store in 2009, focusing on the Polaroid SX-70. Six months later they opened their first retail store, located in Causeway Bay, Hong Kong. Shortly afterwards, their first SX-70 warranty and repair center was set up. Seeing the growing interest and demand, in 2013, MiNT hired a full team of engineers to develop cameras and instant photo technology. In 2021 the company set up a small camera factory dedicated to manufacturing MiNT items.

== Cameras ==
=== InstantKon series ===
This is MiNT's rangefinder line that includes RF70 for instax wide film and SF70 for instax square film. It uses a rangefinder for focussing. It is designed to take exceptionally beautiful photos, in contrast with common instant cameras that are usually designed to be simple and toyish that appeal to the masses. For this, MiNT used professionally designed lenses, aperture and shutter control in their design to let the user create a depth-of-field effect in their photos.

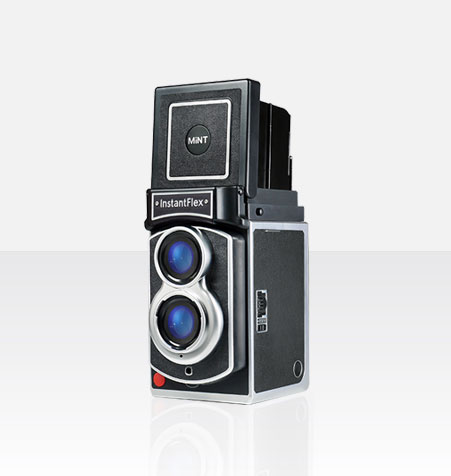
MiNT Instantflex TL70

=== InstantFlex series ===
The cameras in this series apply a twin lens design. One lens on the top for viewing and the bottom lens for capturing images onto the film. The 'TL' in 'TL70' stands for Twins Lens. The first model was released in 2015. A year later, TL70 2.0 was released with the 5 times brighter Fresnel Super Viewfinder upgrade, 32% larger magnifier, and improved shutter and aperture mechanism.

There is also a TL70 Plus version of the camera.

=== SLR670 series ===
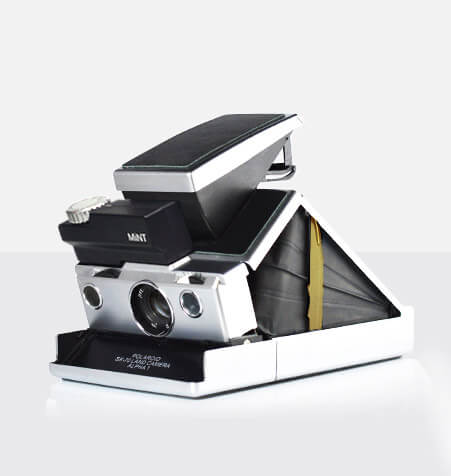
MiNT SLR670-S

MiNT upgrades existing SX-70's into their SLR670's by replacing the old electronic circuit boards with newly designed ones. The Time Machine add-on allows the user to choose different manual shutter speeds, as well as 600 film compatibility under the "Auto 600" mode. The SLR670 is considered by instant photographers as the "ideal instant camera'', since it is built upon the most sought after Polaroid SX-70, and has modern compatibility.

The Type-i upgrade allows users to use Polaroid's no-battery I-type film.

== Accessories ==
=== Flash Bar ===
In 2011, MiNT released an electronic flash bar, compatible with all Polaroid folding and box-type SX-70 type cameras. The flash has a half-power setting for 600 film and a full power setting for SX-70 film. If desired, users can choose half power mode and use 600 film with their SX-70 cameras. The second generation was released in 2013 with improved charging time and an auto-sleep function. It can be used with color filters and provides a sync port to trigger external flashes.

The MiNT Flash Bar is considered an essential accessory for the SX-70. It is difficult to get good pictures without it, especially indoors.

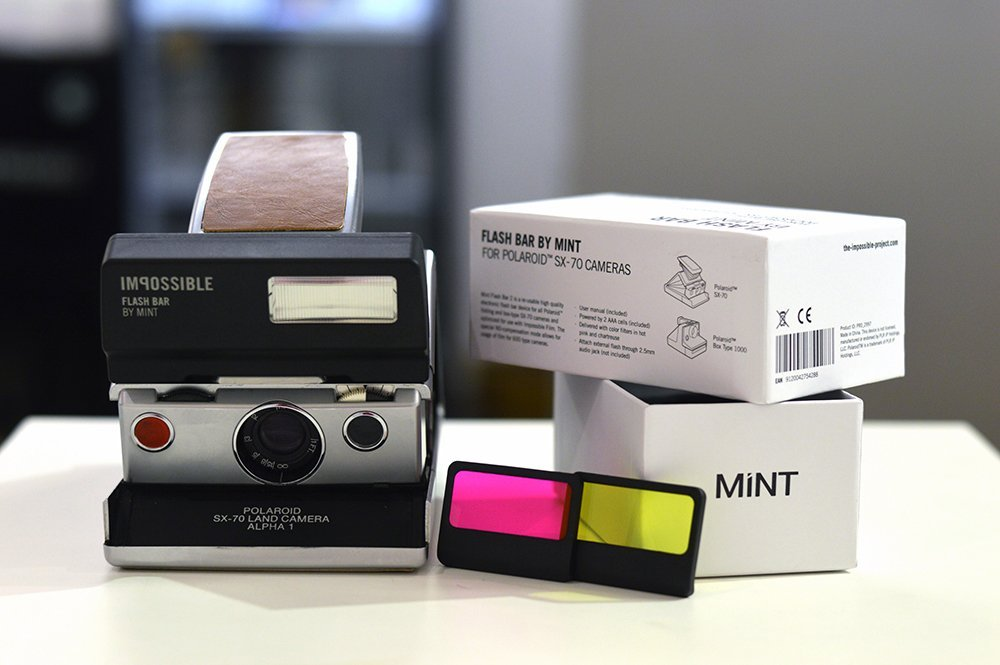
The MiNT Flash Bar with its original packaging, shown here attached to a Polaroid SX-70.

=== Lens Set ===
The MiNT Lens Set was also released in the same year. It can be used with any Polaroid SX-70 camera. The set includes an ND filter, blue filter, yellow filter, close-up lens and a fisheye lens to create different effects. Since Polaroid film will exhibit red or yellow colour casts under bright sunlight and hot weather, using a blue filter will correct the white balance to a more natural colour. The yellow filter is used with black & white film to increase image contrast.

=== Self(ie) Timer ===
The Self(ie) Timer is a tiny device that counts down automatically when the button is pressed. It is compatible with all folding Polaroid SX-70s.
