= Razor-and-blades model =

Business model

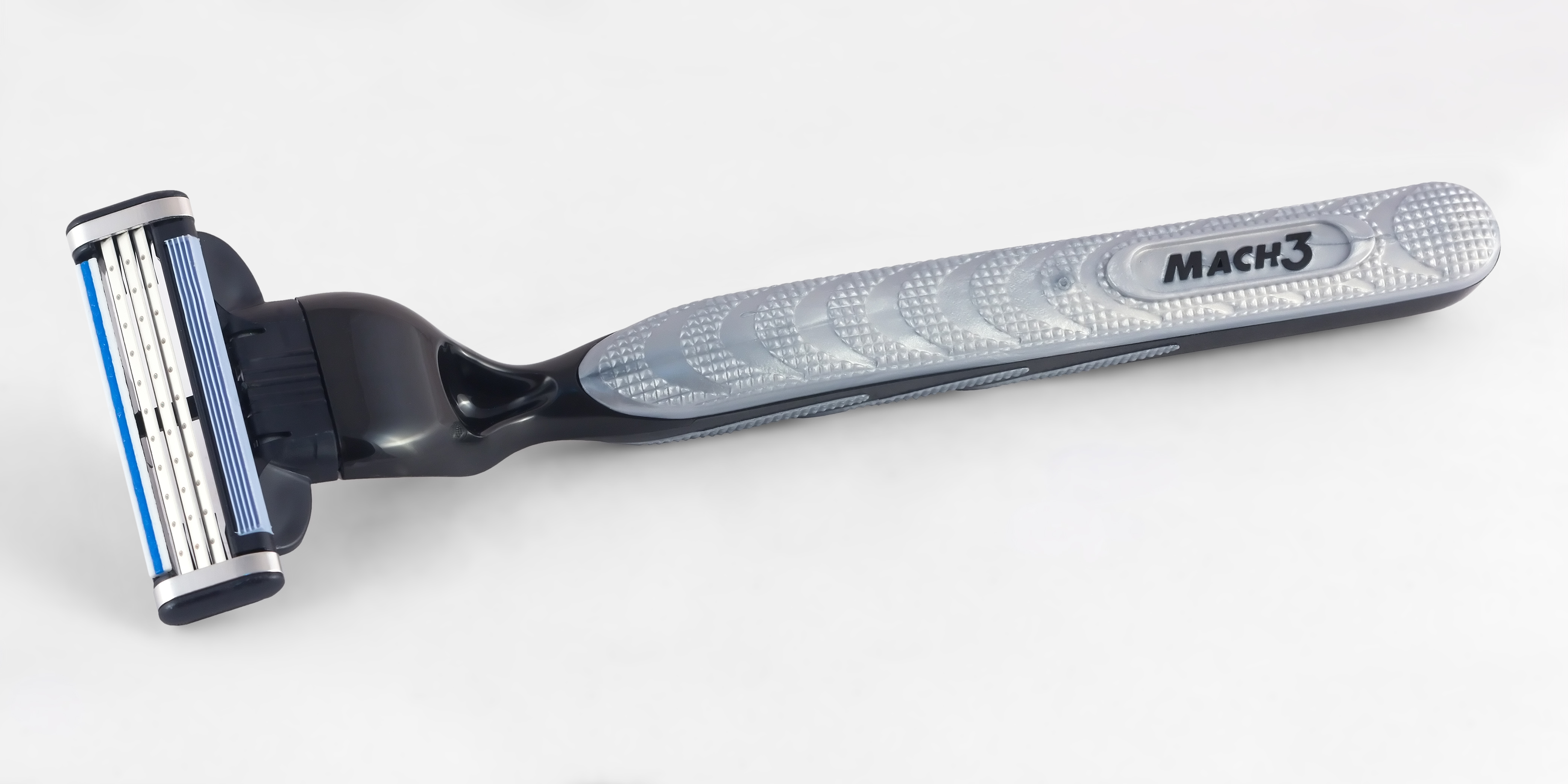
A razor with its attached blade. With the razor-and-blades model, the razor would be inexpensive but the blades would come at a significant cost.

The razor-and-blades business model is a business model in which one article is sold at a low price or even given away in order to increase sales of a complementary good, such as consumable supplies. It is different from loss leader marketing and product sample marketing, which do not depend on complementary products or services. Common examples of the razor-and-blades model include inkjet printers whose ink cartridges are significantly marked up in price, coffee machines that use single-use coffee pods, electric toothbrushes, and video game consoles, which require additional purchases of accessories and software not included in the original package.

Although the concept and the catchphrase "Give 'em the razor; sell 'em the blades" are widely credited to King Camp Gillette, the inventor of the double-edged safety razor, Gillette did not in fact follow this model, nor did it invent the razor-and-blades model, although it did pioneer the production and sale of disposable razor blades.

== Development ==
The legend about Gillette is that he realized that a disposable razor blade would not only be convenient, but also generate a continuous revenue stream. To foster that stream, he sold razors at an artificially low price to create a market for the blades. However, Gillette razors were expensive when they were first introduced, and the price only went down after his patents expired in the 1920s: it was his competitors who invented the razors-and-blades model.

== Applications ==
This model has been used in several businesses for many years.

=== Standard Oil ===
With dominance in the American domestic market, Standard Oil and its owner, John D. Rockefeller, looked to China to expand their business. Representatives of Standard Oil gave away eight million kerosene lamps or sold them at greatly reduced prices to increase the demand for kerosene.

Among American businessmen, this gave rise to the catchphrase "Oil for the lamps of China." Alice Tisdale Hobart's novel Oil for the Lamps of China was a fictional treatment of the phenomenon.

=== Eastman Kodak ===
In its decades as the dominant photographic film producer in the United States, Kodak sold its cameras at low prices and enjoyed large profit margins on the consumables of the trade, such as film, printing supplies, and processing chemicals. While this strategy worked for many years, it was challenged in the late 20th century when a rival, Fujifilm, introduced more economical film and processing methods. Finally, digital photography made the strategy almost obsolete, as it needed fewer consumables like lens, batteries and SD cards.

=== Instant cameras ===
Instant cameras also follow the razor and blades business model. For example, Fujifilm's Instax cameras are sold at a low price, while the film they use costs as much as $2.00 per photo.

== Issues ==
The razor and blades model may be threatened if competition forces down the price of the consumable item. For such a market to be successful, the company must have an effective monopoly on the corresponding goods. (Note: Predatory pricing to destroy a smaller competitor is not covered here.)

=== Specific examples ===
==== Printers ====
Computer printer manufacturers have gone through extensive efforts to make sure that their printers are incompatible with lower cost after-market ink cartridges and refilled cartridges. This is because the printers are often sold at or below cost to generate sales of proprietary cartridges which will generate profits for the company over the life of the equipment. In certain cases — such as for the most inexpensive inkjet printers — the cost of replacing disposable ink or toner may even approach the cost of buying new equipment with included cartridges. Methods of vendor lock-in include designing the cartridges in a way that makes it possible to patent certain parts or aspects, or invoking the Digital Millennium Copyright Act to prohibit reverse engineering by third-party ink manufacturers. Another method entails completely disabling the printer when a non-proprietary ink cartridge is placed into the machine, instead of merely issuing an ignorable message that a non-genuine (yet still fully functional) cartridge was installed.

In Lexmark Int'l v. Static Control Components the United States Court of Appeals for the Sixth Circuit ruled that circumvention of Lexmark's ink cartridge lock does not violate the DMCA. On the other hand, in August 2005, Lexmark won a case in the United States that allowed them to sue certain large customers for violating their boxwrap license.

==== Console video games ====
Atari had a similar problem in the 1980s with Atari 2600 games. Atari was initially the only developer and publisher of games for the 2600; it sold the 2600 itself at cost and relied on the games for profit. When several programmers left to found Activision and began publishing cheaper games of comparable quality, Atari was left without a source of profit. Lawsuits to block Activision were unsuccessful. Atari added measures to ensure games were from licensed producers only for its later-produced 5200 and 7800 consoles.

In more recent times, video game consoles have often been sold at a loss while software and accessory sales are highly profitable to the console manufacturer. For this reason, console manufacturers aggressively pursue legal action against carriers of modchips and jailbreaks due to a belief that the resulting possibility of unauthorized or prohibited copying causes a loss in profits. Particularly in the sixth generation era and beyond, Sony and Microsoft, with their PlayStation 2 and Xbox, had high manufacturing costs. As such, the companies sold their consoles at a loss and aimed to make a profit from game sales. Nintendo had a different strategy with its GameCube, which was considerably less expensive to produce than its rivals, so it retailed at break-even or higher prices. In the following generation of consoles, both Sony and Microsoft have continued to sell their consoles, the PlayStation 3 and Xbox 360 respectively, at a loss, with the practice continuing with the concurrent eighth and ninth generations of console hardware.

==== Nuclear energy ====
Ever since the beginning of the commercial nuclear power industry, the business model has centered on selling the reactor at cost (or at a loss) and making its profits off fuel-supply contracts by exploiting vendor lock-in.

==== Mobile phones ====
Mobile handsets provided with monthly usage contracts are often provided at below cost price or even free of charge, particularly if obtained as an upgrade from an older model. The monthly contract funds the handset cost and in many countries, the contract will include a minimum contract term which has to be carried out. This will often work out to be more expensive than buying the phone outright.

=== Other goods ===
Consumers may also find other uses for the subsidized product rather than use it for the company's intended purpose, which adversely affects revenue streams. This has happened to "free" personal computers with expensive proprietary Internet services and contributed to the failure of the CueCat barcode scanner.

Affiliate marketing makes extensive use of this business model, as many products are promoted as having a "free" trial, that entice consumers to sample the product and pay only for shipping and handling. Advertisers of heavily promoted products such as açaí berry targeting dieters hope the consumer will continue paying for continuous shipments of the product at inflated prices, and this business model has been met with much success.

Websites specializing in sampling and discounts have proven to be popular with economy-minded consumers, who visit sites which use product samples as link bait. The business model of these sites is to attract visitors that will click through to complete affiliate offers.

=== Tying ===
Tying is a variation of razor and blades marketing that is often illegal when the products are not naturally related, such as requiring a bookstore to stock up on an unpopular title before allowing them to purchase a bestseller. Tying is also known in some markets as "third line forcing".

Some kinds of tying, especially by contract, have historically been regarded as anti-competitive. The basic idea is that consumers are harmed by being forced to buy an undesired good (the tied good) to purchase a good they actually want (the tying good), and so would prefer that the goods be sold separately. The company doing this bundling may have a significantly large market share so that it may impose the tie on consumers, despite the forces of market competition. The tie may also harm other companies in the market for the tied good, or who sell only single components.

Another common example comes from how cable and satellite TV providers contract with content producers. The production company pays to produce 25 channels and forces the cable provider to pay for 10 low-audience channels to get a popular channel. Since cable providers lose customers without the popular channel, they are forced to purchase many other channels even if they have a very small viewing audience.

== See also ==
- Aftermarket (merchandise)
- Complementary good, a good that should be consumed with another good
- Consumption subsidies
- Demo, an event in which samples of a product are distributed
- Externality
- Loss leader, for an item that is sold below cost in an effort to stimulate other profitable sales
- Opportunity cost
- Product bundling, offering several products for sale as one combined product
- Product churning, selling more product than is beneficial to the consumer
- Promotional merchandise
- There ain't no such thing as a free lunch (TANSTAAFL)
- Trojan horse
- Vendor lock-in
