= Polaroid Z340 =

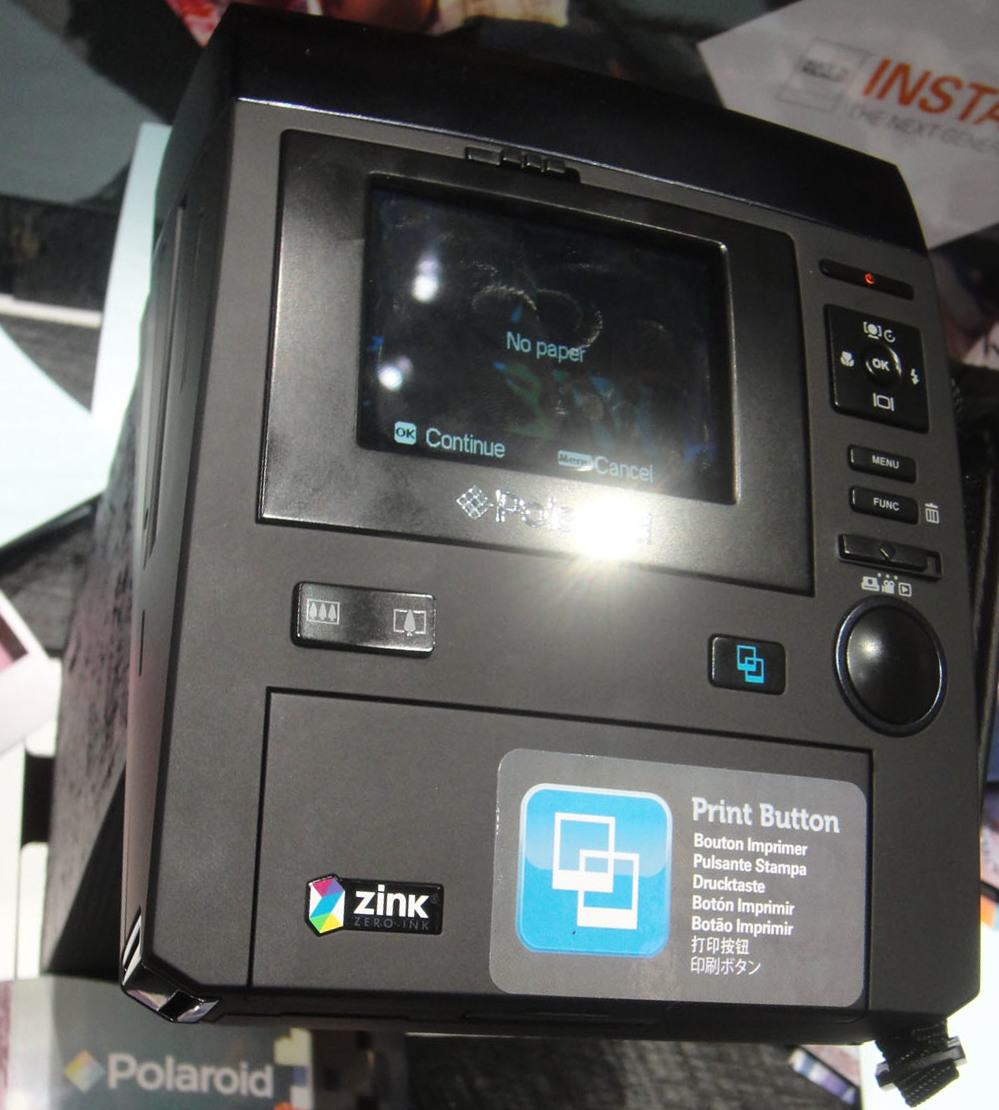
Polaroid Z340

The Polaroid Z340 is a digital camera that includes a system that can print a photograph on special paper in 45 seconds. It was introduced on November 8, 2011. It is a 14-megapixel digital camera that has a Zink printing system. The camera's printer does not use an ink cartridge. Instead, according to PC World, "cyan, yellow and magenta crystals inside the Zink printing paper are clear until heated by the photo process to create the images." The camera includes basic photo editing software, and can add a variety of decorative borders to the prints.

The Z340 has been designed to resemble the appearance of the Polaroid Spectra cameras popular in the 1980s. It weighs 23 ounces.

Technology writer Nathan Ingraham commented that the then "price for novelty is steep" at $299.99.
