= Iunctim =

The Latin word iunctim (also spelled junctim) denotes the process of connecting two or more independent agreements (contracts, treaties, bills of law) according to the principle that one agreement will not be made unless an agreement is found for all other items as well.

== In legislation ==
Some jurisdictions circumvent legislative attempts at iunctim by giving their chief executive a line-item veto to strike out one or some provisions enacted in a given bill without vetoing the entire bill.

== In contract law ==
In many jurisdictions, laws regulating competition limit the extent to which a contract can tie one condition to another.

== Examples ==
- In 2007, Red Hat was willing to sign a technical interoperability contract with Microsoft, provided that the deal did not address copyright or patents. A Red Hat representative stated, "I want to talk to the folks at Microsoft about our two operating systems and how we can work together to solve real customer problems without attaching any unrelated strings, such as intellectual property." However, Microsoft refused. A Microsoft spokesperson stated, "[Y]ou can't just sit back and talk about interoperability for interoperability's sake without fully solving the customer issue. Unless you actually address the issues around IP, you haven't fully solved the customer's interoperability problem."
