= Lomography Lomo'Instant Square Glass =

Instax analog camera

Overview
- Maker: Lomography
- Type: Instant camera

Lens
- Lens: 95 mm (45 mm equivalent (Note: Equivalent angle of view in full frame format))
- F-numbers: f/10–f/22

Sensor/medium
- Film format: Instax Square; Instax Mini
- Film size: 62 mm × 62 mm (Instax Square); 46 mm × 62 mm (Instax Mini)
- Recording medium: Film

Focusing
- Focus: Manual, zone focusing: 0.8 m / 1–2.5 m / infinity

Exposure/metering
- Exposure bracketing: +1/-1

Flash
- Flash: Built-in; guide number: 9 (m)

Shutter
- Shutter speed range: 8 s – 1/250 s

General
- Battery: 2 x CR2 batteries (6 V)

The Lomography Lomo'Instant Square Glass is an Instax analog camera made by Lomography. It uses Instax Square and Mini instant film. When introduced in January 2018, it was "the first analog camera to shoot square Instax film."

== Details ==
The Lomography Lomo'Instant Square Glass has an automatic shutter speed / aperture mode, and a bulb mode. Automatic mode adjusts shutter speed, aperture and flash output to suit its surroundings. Automatic mode will use an aperture range of f/10 to f/22; and a shutter speed ranging from as fast as 1/250 s to as slow as 8 s. Bulb mode allows the shutter to be manually held open for up to 30 s.

Focusing is manual, with three zone focus ranges able to be selected: 0.8 m, 1–2.5 m, and infinity. The switch is reset to the 1–2.5 m range each time the camera is opened.

The camera has a built-in 95 mm (45 mm equivalent) prime lens, with a closest focusing distance of 0.8 m. "The lens is glass, a step up from the plastic lenses you get with all Fujifilm and some Lomography instant cameras." The following lens attachments can be screwed onto the front of the camera:

- Wide-Angle Glass Lens Attachment – works in conjunction with the camera's built-in lens to give ? mm (21 mm equivalent) with a 91.5° converted angle of view and a closest focusing distance of 0.5 m
- Portrait Glass Lens Attachment / Self-Portrait Glass Lens Attachment – lens attachment for shortening the closest focusing distance to 0.5 m.

It has a flash which is on by default, but can be switched off. The flash has a guide number of 9 (metres).

The viewfinder is offset from the picture taking lens, thus parallax must be taken into account. The viewfinder has a semi-opaque mask covering a portion of it, intended to help framing when the subject is at the camera's closest focus range.

== Reception ==
Reviewers have criticised the camera's viewfinder. Jack Rear, reviewing the camera in The Daily Telegraph, wrote "I found close-ups hard to get right, because the viewfinder isn’t good enough to make a good distinction between where something is and where it looks like it is." Dan Bracaglia, reviewing the camera for Digital Photography Review, wrote that "the viewfinder is small, imprecise and confusingly masked, making accurate compositions a lottery in the 0.8 - 2 m (2 - 6.6 ft) focus range." A review in Wired commented that "the Lomo'Instant Square has an off-center viewfinder that's far, far away from the long lens. It's tricky to frame shots up just right, and you'll need to mentally compensate for parallax to make sure your subject is where you want it."

== See also ==
- Instant camera
- List of Instax cameras and printers
