= Zink (printing) =

Full-color inkless printing technology

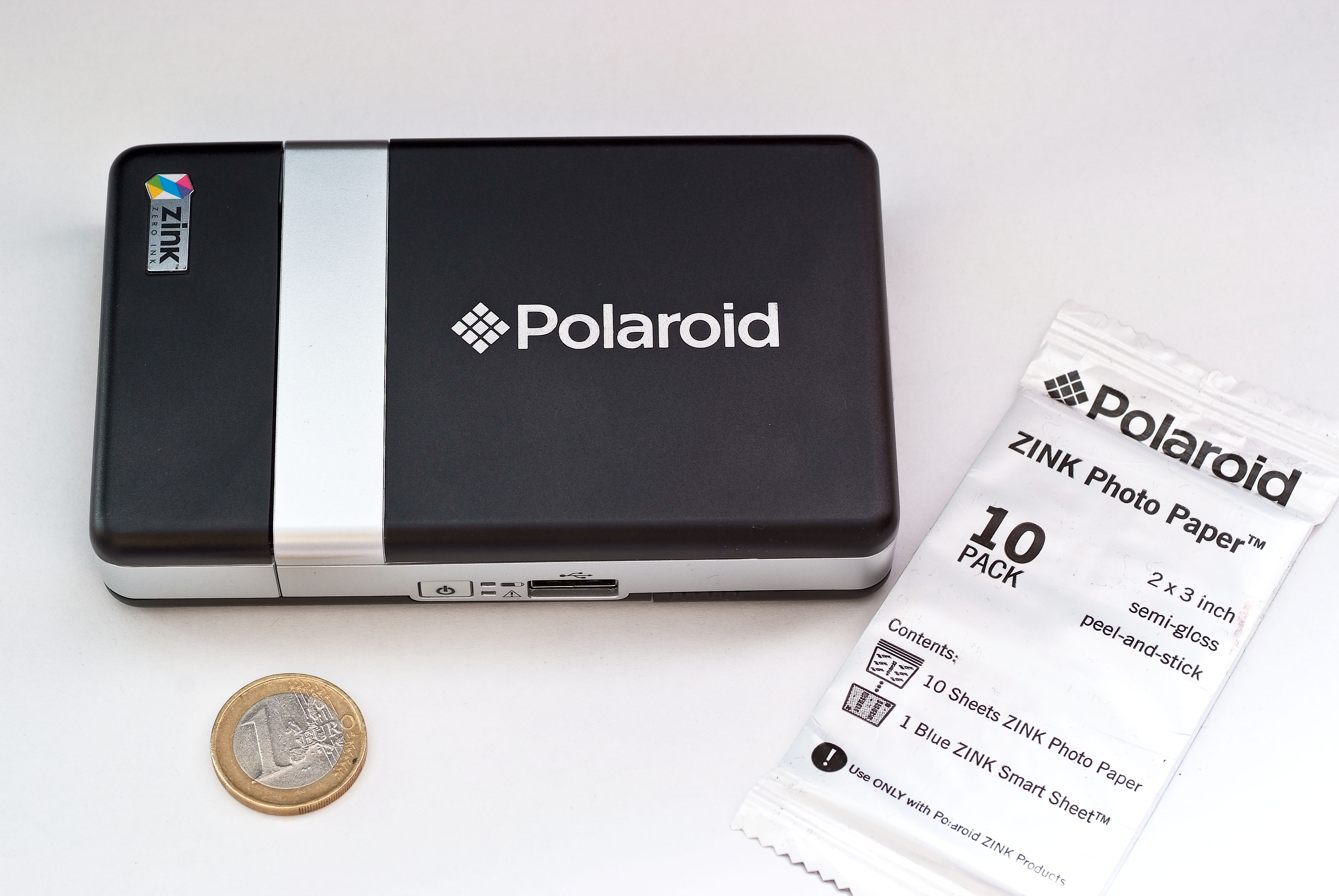
Polaroid Zink printer

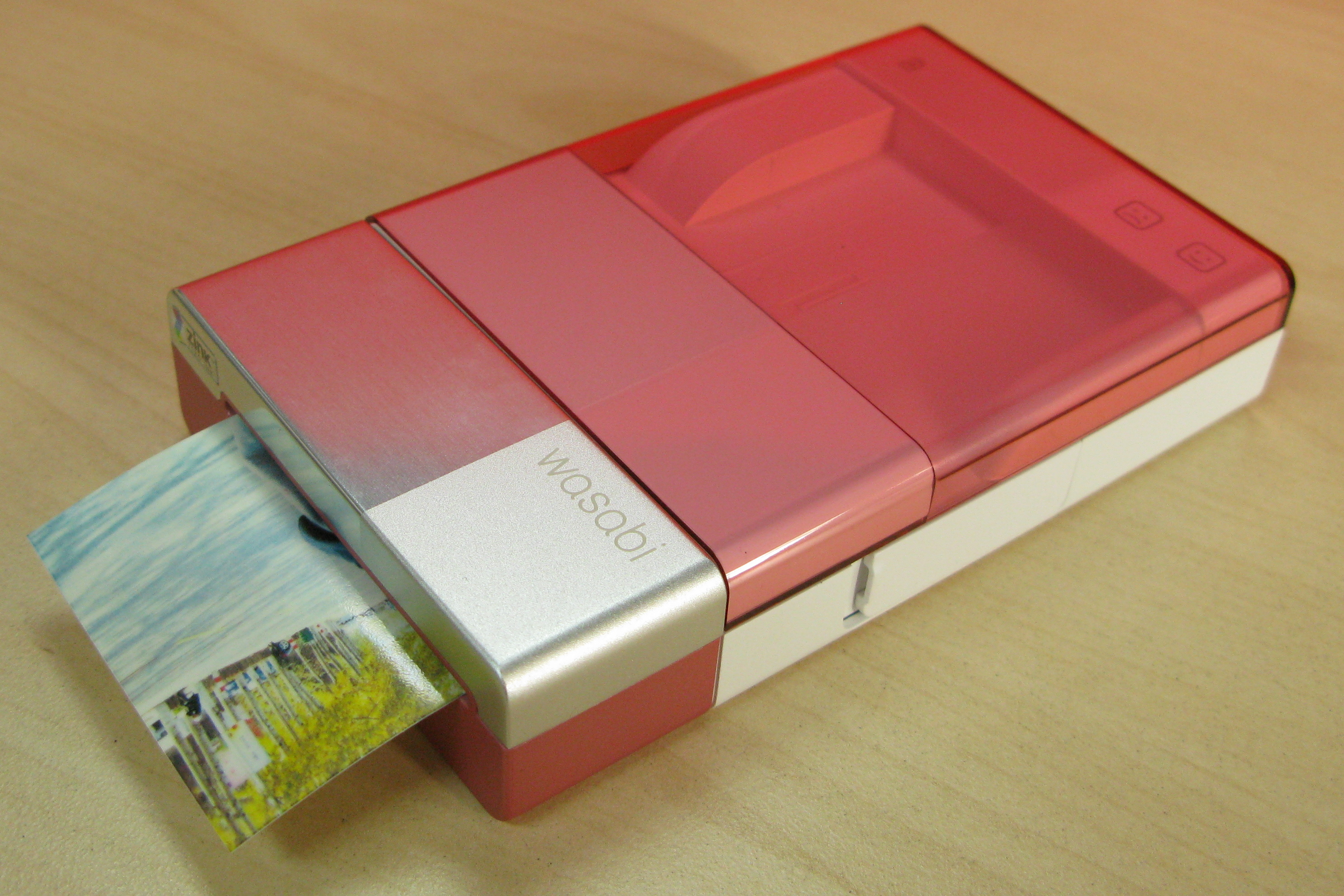
Dell Wasabi PZ310 Zink printer

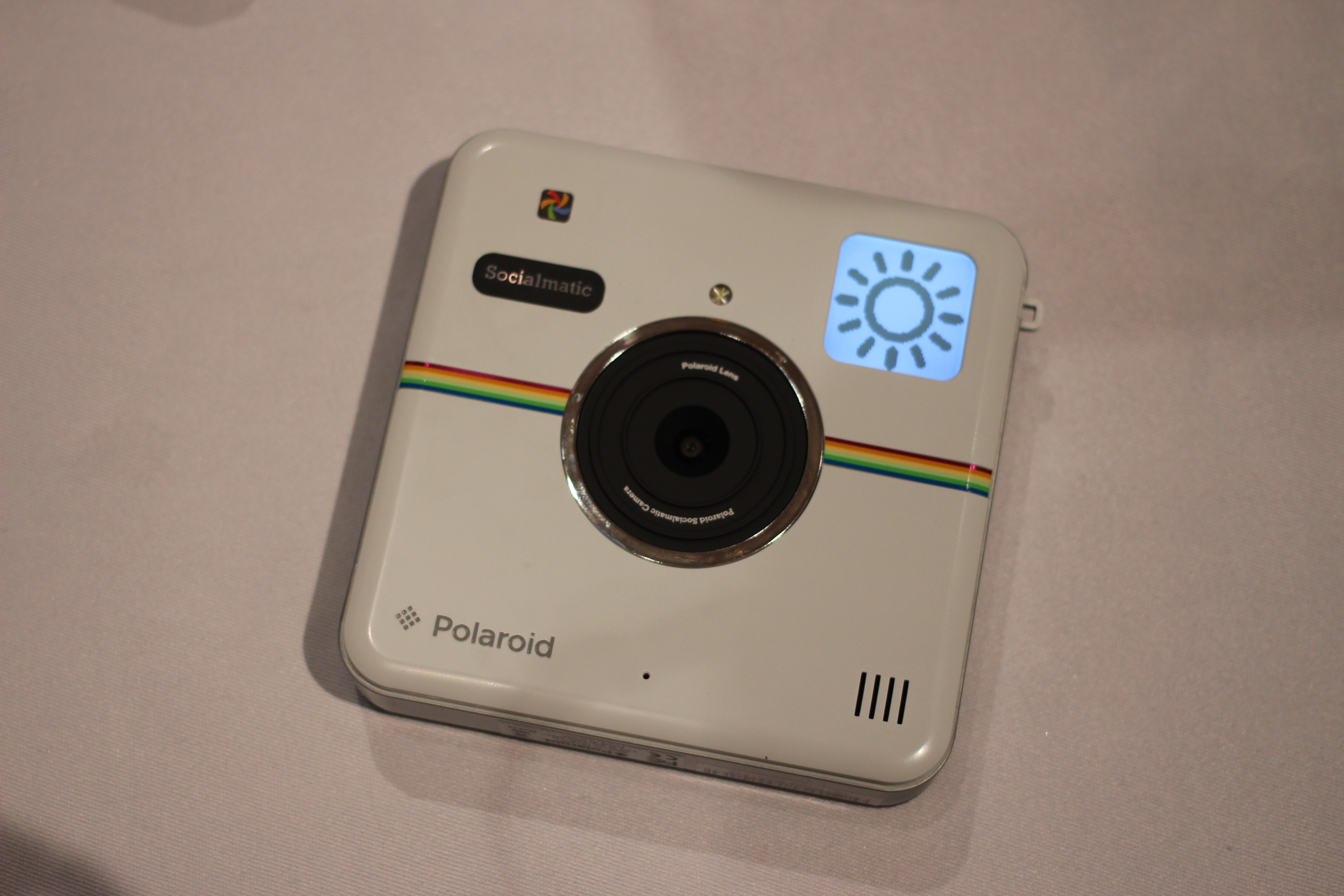
Polaroid Socialmatic Zink camera

Zink (stylised as ZINK, a portmanteau of zero and ink) is a full-color printing technology for digital devices that does not require ink cartridges and prints in a single pass.

The printing technology and its thermal paper are developed by Zink Holdings LLC, a U.S. company, with offices in Edison, New Jersey, and Billerica, Massachusetts, and a manufacturing facility in Whitsett, North Carolina. Zink Holdings makes all the paper, and makes a printer for printing labels and other designs on rolls of Zink zRoll. It licenses its technology to other companies that make compact photo printers, and combined camera / compact photo printers. Key licensees include HP, Lifeprint, Prynt, and C&A Global.

The Zink technology started as a project inside Polaroid Corporation in the 1990s, which spun out Zink as a fully independent company in 2005.

== Technology ==
The paper has several layers: a backing layer with optional pressure sensitive adhesive, heat-sensitive layers with cyan, magenta and yellow dyes in colorless form, and an overcoat.

The color addressing is achieved by controlling the heat pulse length and intensity.

The color-forming layers contain colorless crystals of amorphochromic dyes. These dyes form microcrystals of their colorless tautomers, which convert to the colored form by melting and retain color after resolidification.

The yellow layer is the topmost one, sensitive to short heat pulses of high temperature. The magenta layer is in the middle, sensitive to longer pulses of moderate temperature. The cyan layer is at the bottom, sensitive to long pulses of lower temperature. The layers are separated by thin interlayers, acting as heat insulation, moderating the heat throughout.

== Zink Holdings LLC ==
Zink Holdings LLC
- Industry: Consumer electronics, Photography
- Predecessor: Polaroid
- Headquarters: Billerica, Massachusetts, United States
- Products: Cameras; Printers
- Website: zink.com

Zink Holdings LLC is a technology company headquartered in Billerica, Massachusetts (formerly Bedford, Massachusetts), founded in 2005. It develops what it calls "ZINK Zero Ink technology" and "ZINK Paper". Zink’s Research and development labs and headquarters are in Billerica, with a paper manufacturing plant in Whitsett, North Carolina (using staff and facilities previously used by Konica Minolta).

Zink started as one of two major new technologies being developed inside Polaroid Corporation in Cambridge, Massachusetts, in the 1990s, with 100 researchers working on it. Polaroid Corporation spun out Zink as a fully independent company in 2005, with 50 of its staff moving to it. Zink first unveiled its technology in January 2007, at IDG's DEMO 07 conference.

Zink makes all the paper, along with a printer for printing labels and other designs on rolls of Zink zRoll; and licenses its technology to other companies that make compact photo printers, and combined camera / compact photo printers that print photographs onto mostly 2×3” (about 5×8 cm) sheets of Zink Paper. Alps Electric manufactures the Zink print engines, and Foxconn and Lite-On build Zink-based products for major consumer-products companies. Key licensees include HP, Lifeprint, Prynt, and C&A Global.
