= Instax =

Brand of instant cameras by Fujifilm

- Instax logo
- Maker: Fujifilm
- Speed: 800/30°
- Type: Color instant
- Balance: Daylight
- Format: Mini, Wide, Square
- Introduced: November 10, 1998; 27 years ago

Instax Monochrome
- Maker: Fujifilm
- Type: B&W instant
- Format: Mini and Wide
- Introduced: 2016 (Mini) and 2017 (Wide)

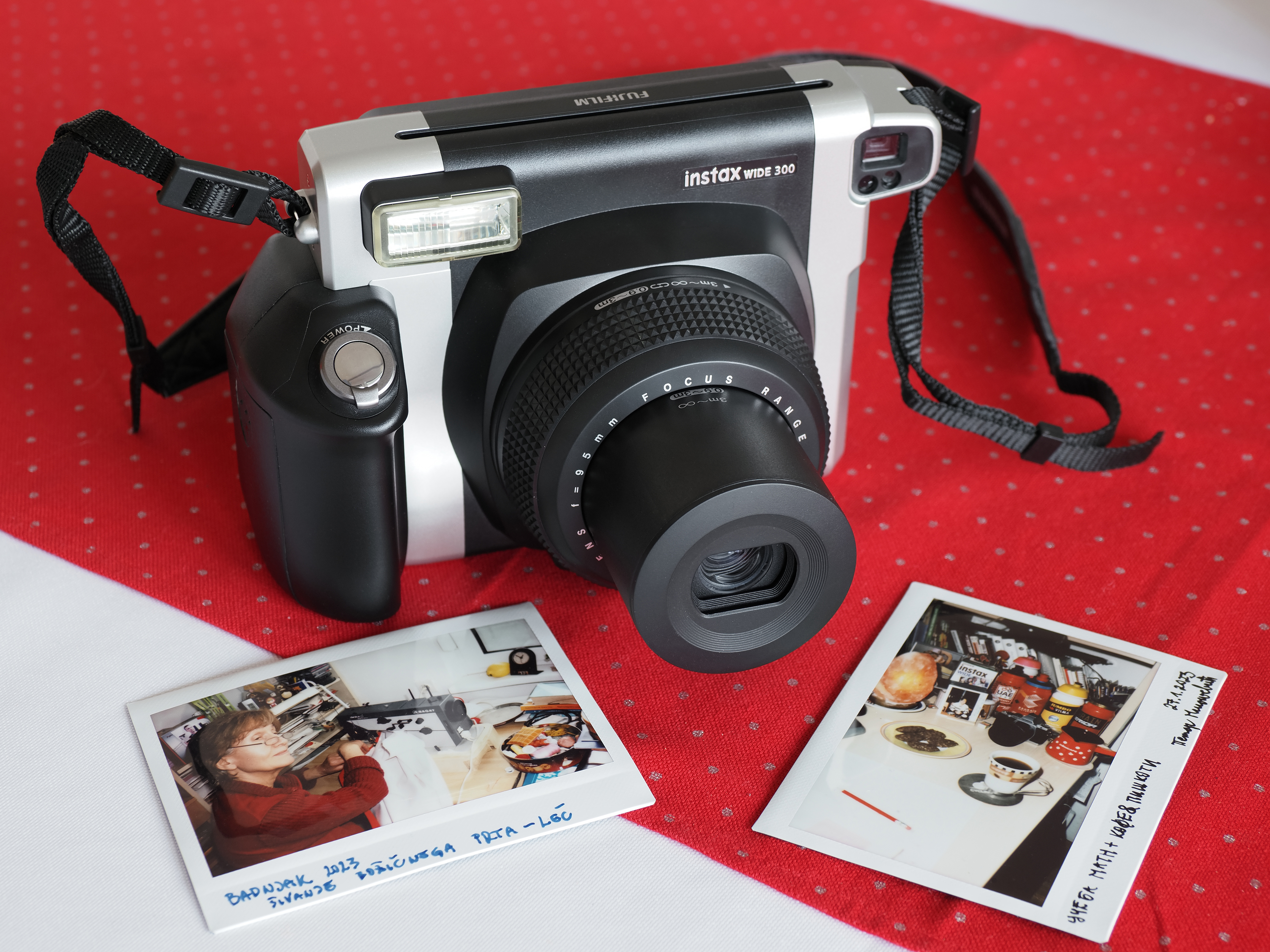
- Fujifilm instax Wide 300

Overview
- Maker: Fujifilm, Lomography, Polaroid Corporation

Lens
- Lens mount: Integral

Sensor/medium
- Film format: Instax
- Film size: Mini or Wide
- Recording medium: Instant film

Footnotes
- Various cameras from various manufacturers

Instax (stylized as instax) is a brand of instant still cameras and instant films marketed by Fujifilm.

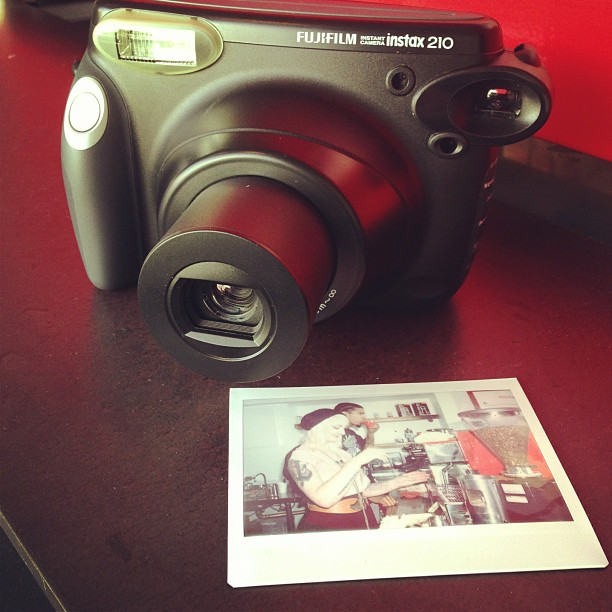
Fujifilm Instax 210 with Instax Wide format photograph

The first camera and accompanying film, the Instax Mini 10 and Instax Mini film, were released on November 10, 1998. The "Wide" film and first accompanying camera were released the following year. The Instax Square film and accompanying camera were released in 2017.

The formats of Instax film give an image size of 46 mm × 62 mm (1.8 in × 2.4 in) for the Mini, 99 mm × 62 mm (3.9 in × 2.4 in) for the Wide and 62 mm × 62 mm (2.4 in × 2.4 in) for the Square. The Instax colour film is available in Mini, Wide, and Square formats and the black and white Instax Monochrome is also available in Mini, Wide, and Square formats.

Other manufacturers also make compatible cameras and camera backs.

== Cameras and printers ==
Fujifilm produces a range of Instax Mini, Instax Square and Instax Wide cameras, as do other manufacturers. Fujifilm also produces Instax Mini and Square printers and has in the past produced Instax Pivi printers.

== Film characteristics ==
Fuji's instant film products are based upon the improvements made to Polaroid's SX-70 instant film system that the Eastman Kodak Company sold in the 1970s and 1980s – namely the ability to expose the film through the rear of the photograph and the reversal of the dye layers' order so that development in the blue layer is visible first. As a result of these changes, the image does not need to be taken via a reflex mirror in order to reverse the image (as all Polaroid integral film cameras do). Colour balance and tonal range are also improved over Polaroid integral instant films. Fuji's decision to integrate the pressure plate springs and batteries into the camera bodies rather than the disposable film pack itself helps make the Instax system more economical per exposure than Polaroid's equivalents.

=== Instax Mini ===
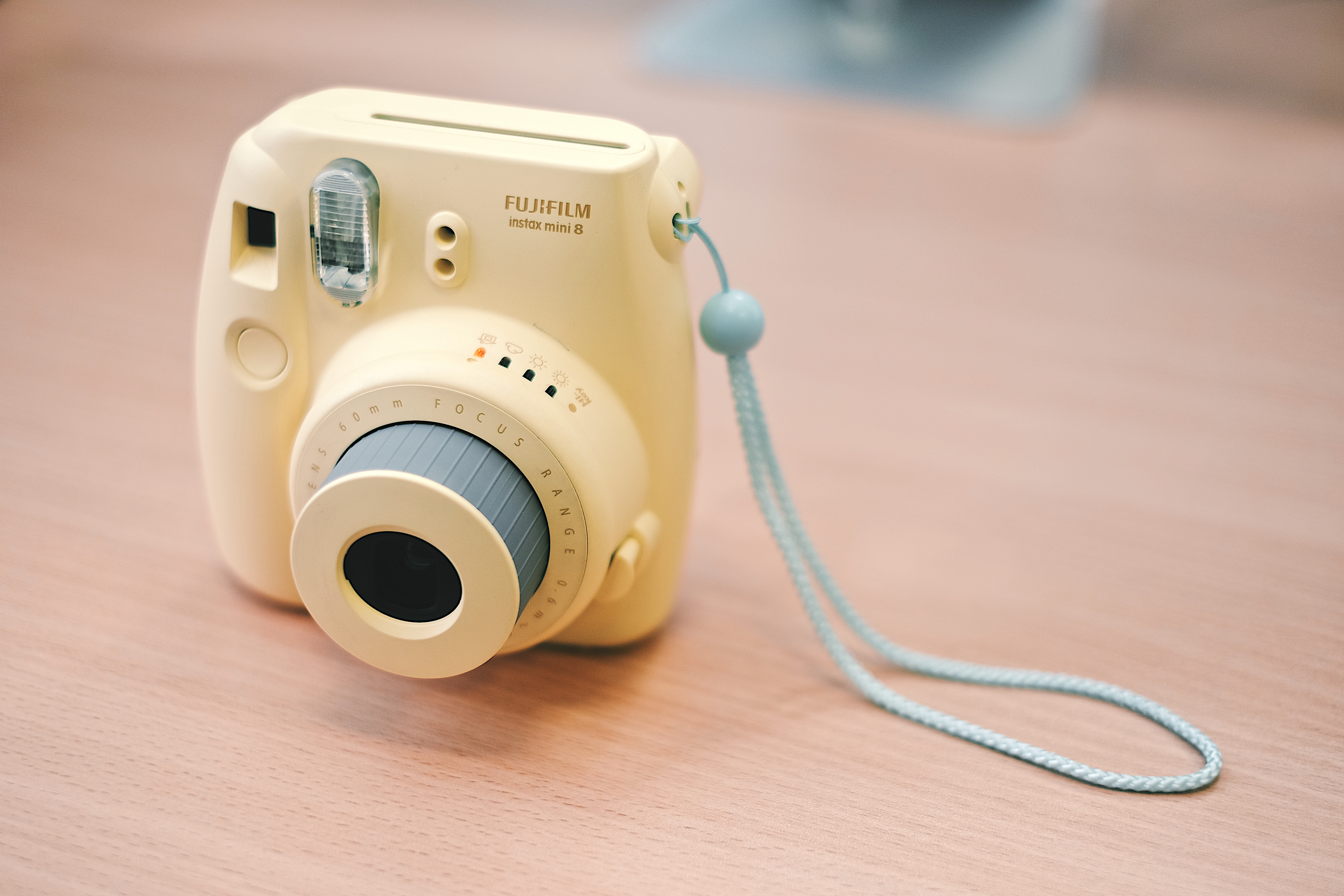
Fujifilm Instax Mini 8 camera

Instax Mini is a 54 mm × 86 mm (2.1 in × 3.4 in) (approximately ISO/IEC 7810 ID-1 credit-card-size) integral daylight ISO 800 color film designed for use with Fujifilm instax mini compatible cameras. In Japan, the Instax Mini cameras are called and referred to as cheki (チェキ), derived from the English "check it".

Film specifications
Film speed	ISO 800/30°
Colour temperature	Daylight type (5500K)
Resolving power	12 lines/mm
Photos per pack	10
Film size (W×H)	54 mm × 86 mm 2.1 in × 3.4 in
Image size (W×H)	46 mm × 62 mm 1.8 in × 2.4 in
Aspect ratio	1:1.348
Film pack size (W×H×D)	61 mm × 92 mm × 20 mm 2.4 in × 3.6 in × 0.8 in

=== Digital Instax Pivi ===
The Digital Instax Pivi line was intended as a digital/analog hybrid. The original intention was to produce a new format to feed a series of digital instant cameras similar in approach to the Olympus C-211, a digital camera with a built-in Polaroid 500 film printer. Fujifilm eventually released the FinePix PR21, a digital camera with a built-in Instax mini printer, in 1999. A stand-alone printer was planned from the start but was not the primary focus, but this changed with the advent of mobile devices. This device made it to market in 2004 (as the Pivi MP-100), after about five years in development.

Instax Pivi film looks physically identical to Instax mini, but it takes a different formulated film producing a color-inverted image when used in a mini camera, making them incompatible.

Film specifications
Film speed	800 ASA
Film size (W×H)	54 mm × 86 mm 2.1 in × 3.4 in
Image size (W×H)	46 mm × 61 mm 1.8 in × 2.4 in

=== Instax Wide ===
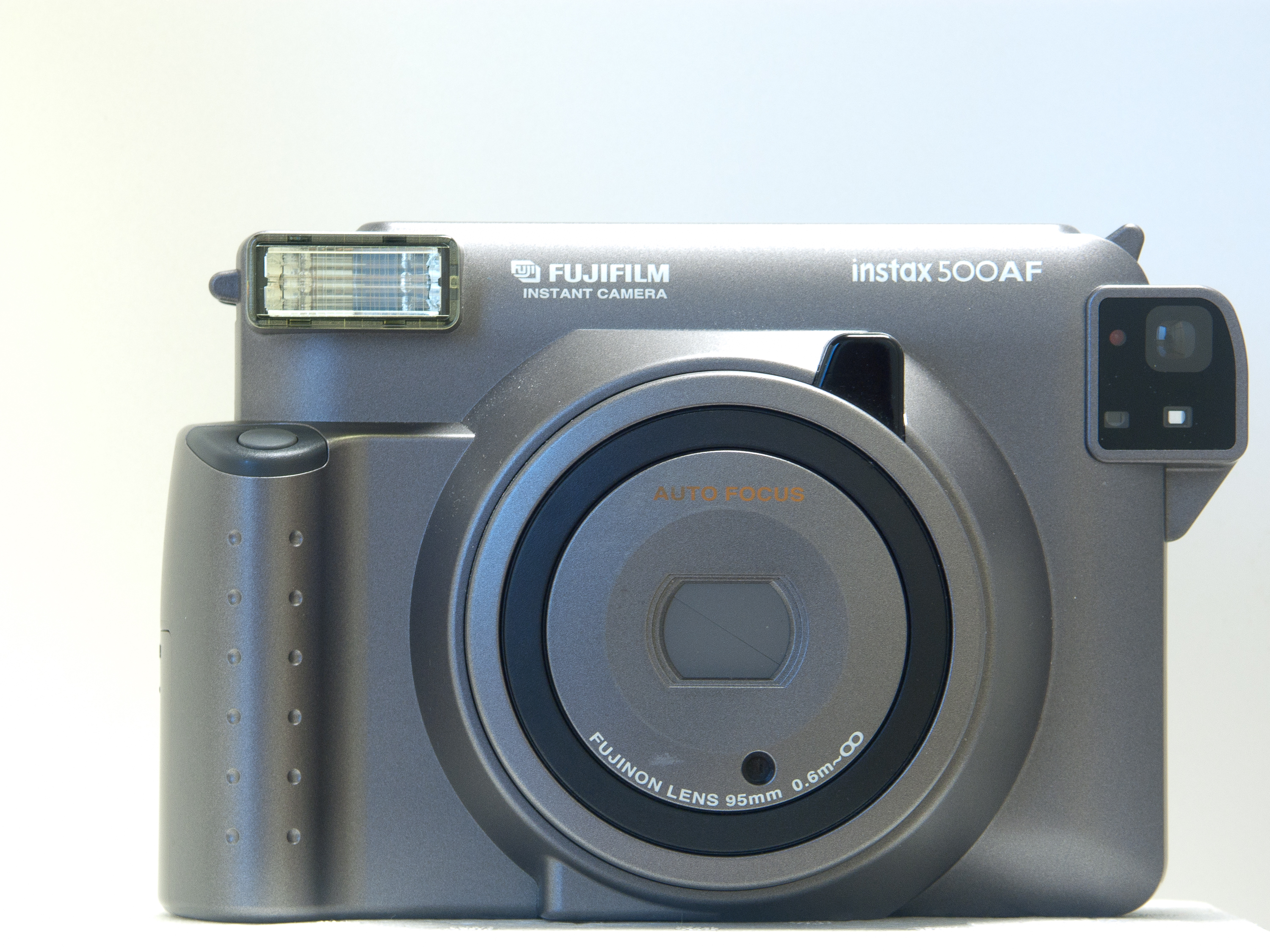
Fujifilm Instax 500AF camera

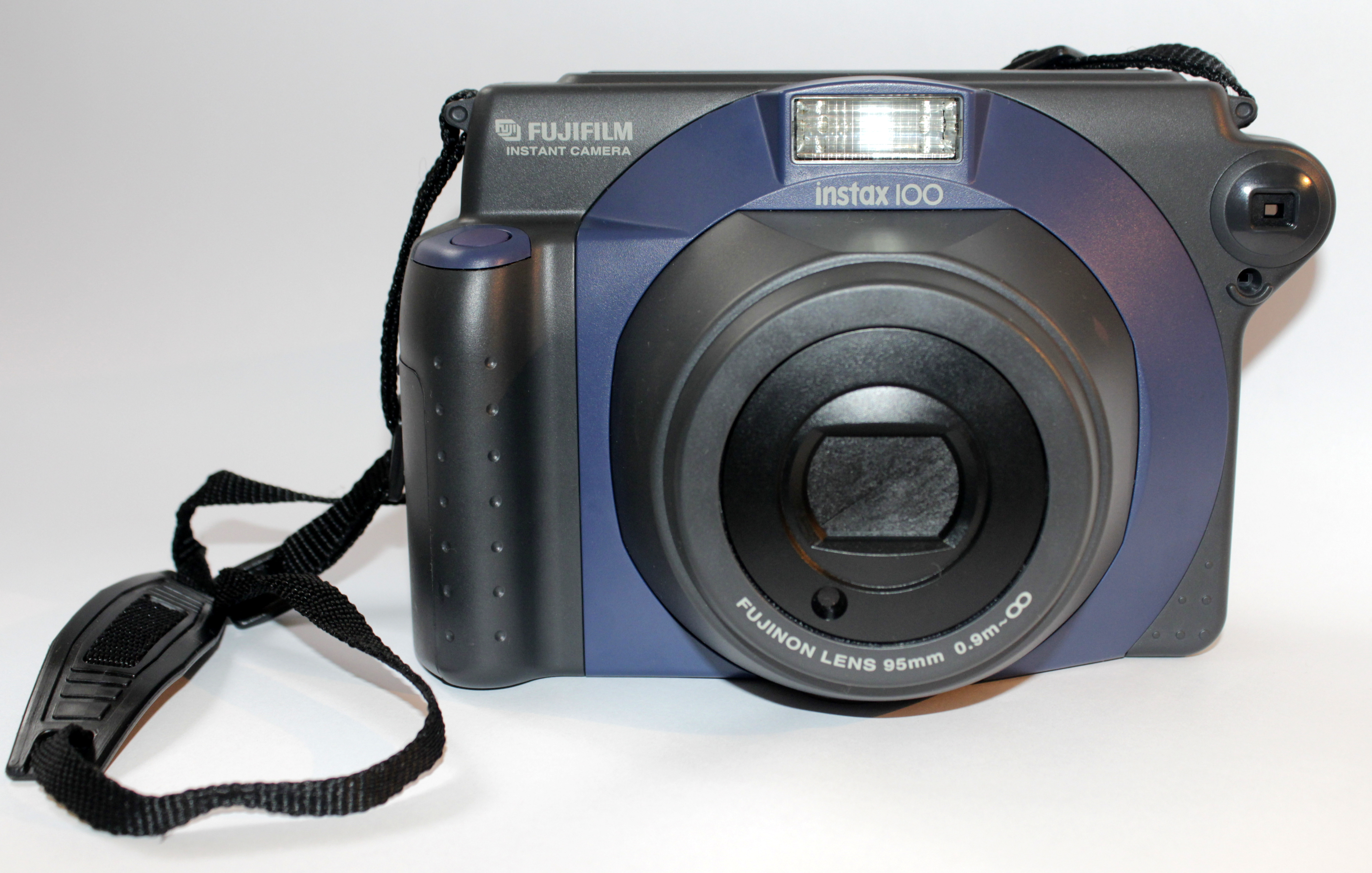
Instax 100 camera

Called Cheki Wide in Japan. Released the year after the mini film and cameras, the area was increased on this format to create an image size based on the golden ratio. Upon introduction, this format was simply called Instax without any suffix (making it the normal, not mini, Instax film), Fujifilm gradually embedded the "Wide" moniker into the name of the product. That rebranding pattern can also be seen on the Instax 210 which is now described on the Fujifilm web site as Instax Wide 210, despite not being referenced elsewhere in such a way. Instax Wide is available in colour and black and white.

Instax Wide 300 has shutter release 1/64 - 1/200 s with exposure compensation ±2/3 EV (Lighten-Darken control) on ISO 800 speed. Film developing time is around 90 s (depends on temperature).

Film specifications
Film speed	ISO 800/30°
Colour temperature	Daylight type (5500K)
Resolving power	10 lines/mm
Photos per pack	10
Film size (W×H)	108 mm × 86 mm 4.3 in × 3.4 in
Image size (W×H)	99 mm × 62 mm 3.9 in × 2.4 in
Aspect ratio	1.6:1
Film pack size (W×H×D)	115 mm × 92 mm × 20 mm 4.5 in × 3.6 in × 0.8 in

=== Instax Square ===
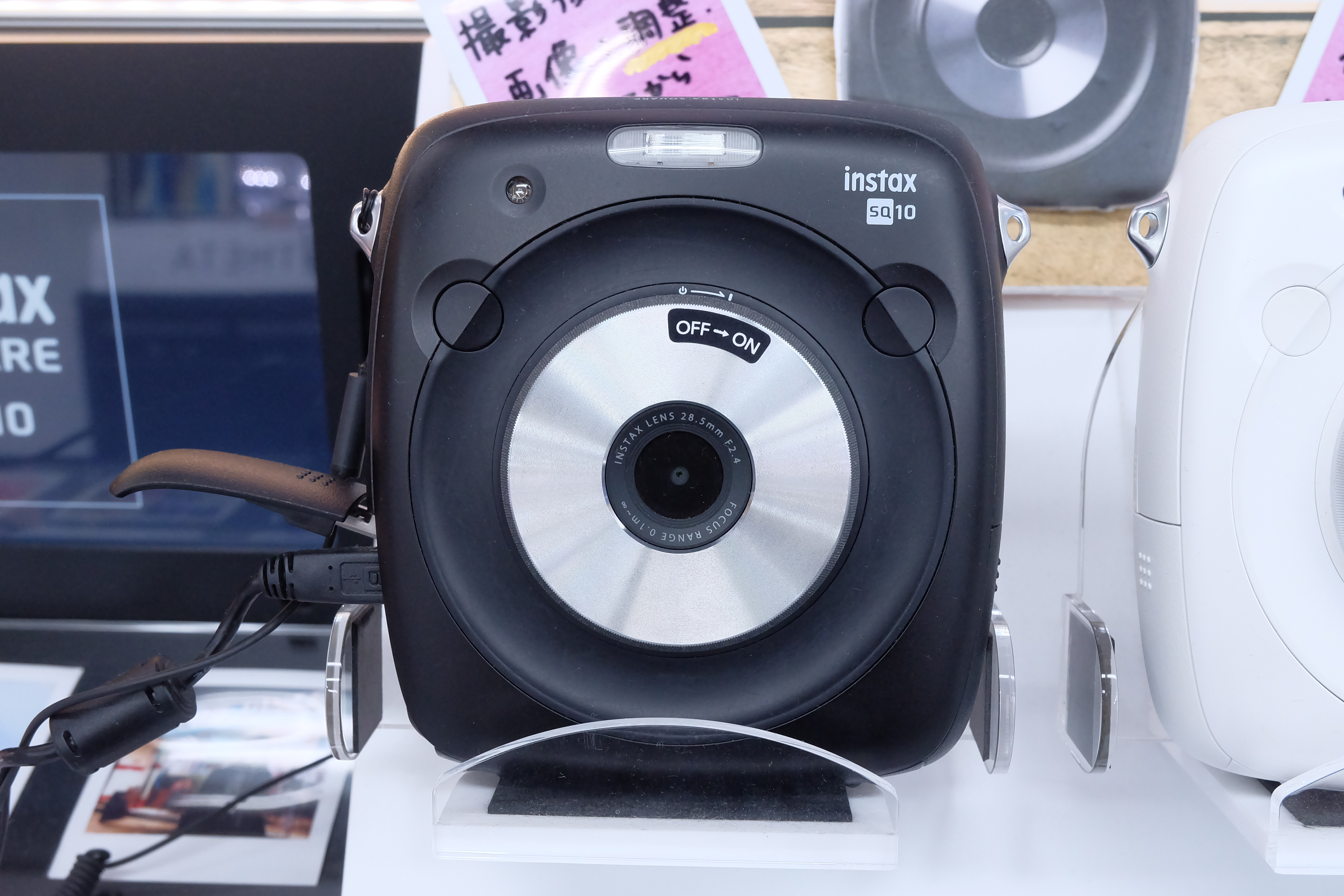
Instax Square SQ10

Called Cheki Square in Japan. Instax Square is a square size of Instax film released in 2017, available in colour. Fujifilm initially only offered a hybrid digital camera/printer. Later, a separate printer and cameras offering fully analog exposure became available.

On September 25, 2018, Fujifilm launched the Square SQ 20 which has a configurable "Motion Mode" function that allows recording of video (max 15 seconds), and the selecting and printing of a frame.

In September 2020, Fujifilm announced that Instax Square would be available in black and white in mid-October.

Film specifications
Film speed	ISO 800
Color temperature	5500K
Resolving power	10 lines/mm
Photos per pack	10
Film size (W×H)	72 mm × 85.6 mm 2.83 in × 3.37 in
Image size (W×H×D)	62 mm × 62 mm 2.4 in × 2.4 in
Aspect ratio	1:1
Film pack size (W×H×D)	79 mm × 91 mm × 19 mm

== History ==
=== Pre-Instax ===
Kodak ceased production of instant film cameras when it was successfully sued by Polaroid for patent infringement in 1986. Fujifilm, through an agreement with Polaroid specifying they could not officially distribute in certain territories (such as the US) until the original patents expired in the mid-1990s, continued to manufacture and market their own line of films. As such, Fuji produced several lines of instant films starting in the early 1980s.

=== Release ===
Instax was released to consumers on November 10, 1998 and was based on those earlier instant film systems, having the same film speed and dye order.

Fujifilm originally wished to release the Instax series worldwide including North America and Europe simultaneously, but chose to work with Polaroid on the mio camera based on the Instax mini 10/20 for the US market. The mio product was discontinued after a few years.

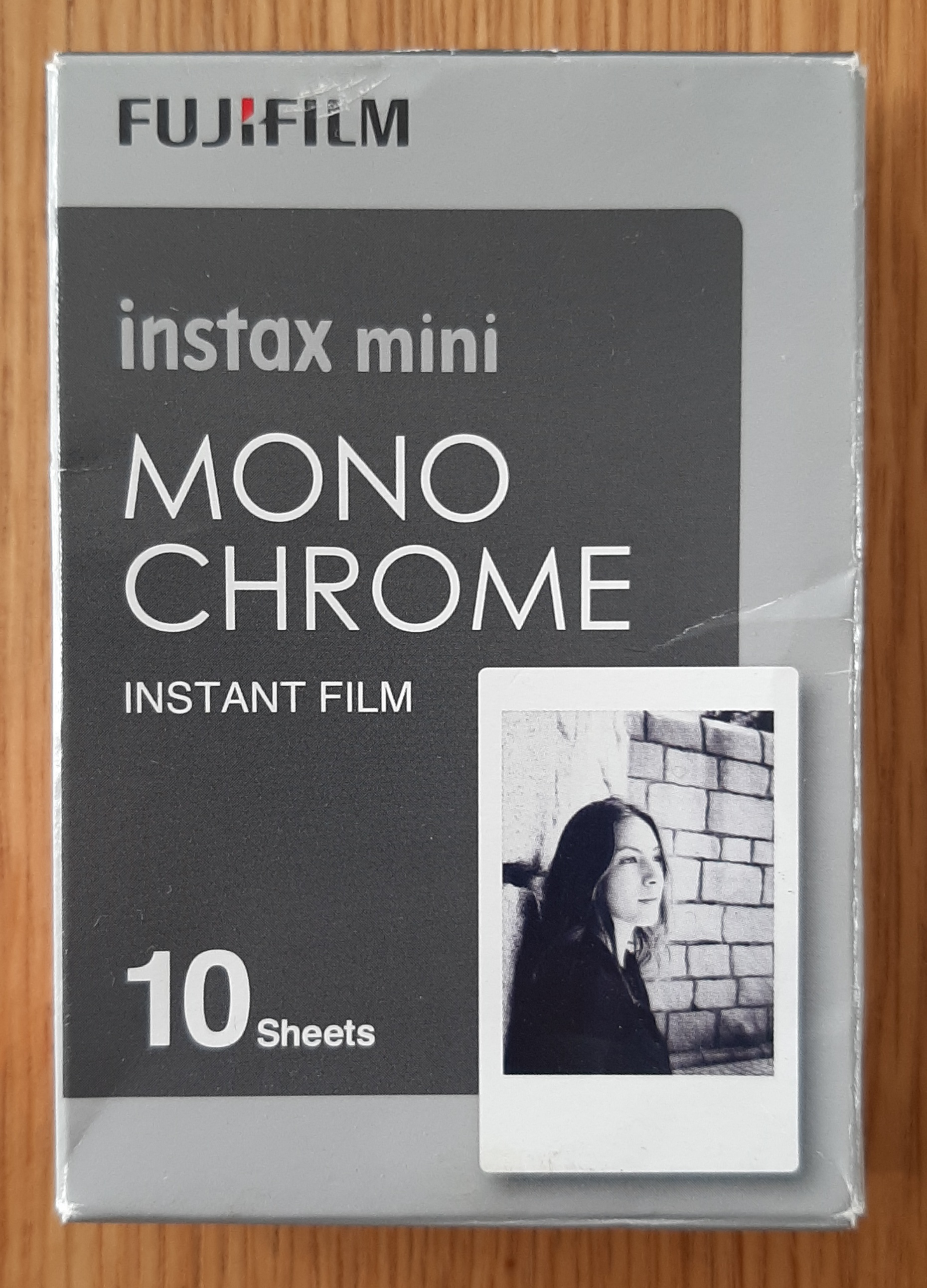
Black and white Instax Mini film

=== Polaroid withdraws ===
With Polaroid ceasing production of instant films in 2008, the Instax system was the only integral instant film system in production until Impossible Project (now Polaroid through brand acquisition) launched their integral film in early 2010. The Instax Mini system is also sold in some markets by Polaroid itself through the Polaroid 300 and Polaroid 300 Film brands (in reality, rebranded Instax Mini 7S and Instax Mini film).

=== Reception and growing popularity ===
In 2014, it was reported that the Instax Mini 8 was outselling flagship models like the Fujifilm X-T1 and Sony α7R.

In 2016, it was reported that sales of Instax cameras had risen to 5 million units the previous fiscal year, up from 100,000 units in 2004. Also that year, Fujifilm released a monochrome formulation of the film.

== See also ==
- Zink (printing)
