= Orthomode transducer =

Component for guiding radio waves

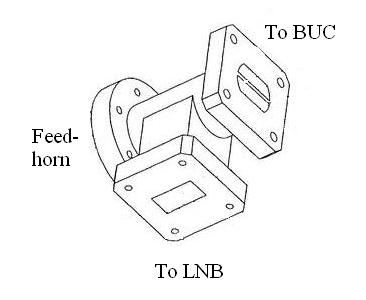
Orthomode transducer, VSAT K_{u} band

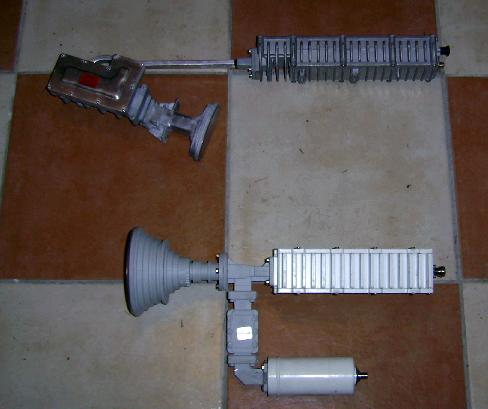
Outdoor unit, includes feed horn, OMT, LNB and BUC

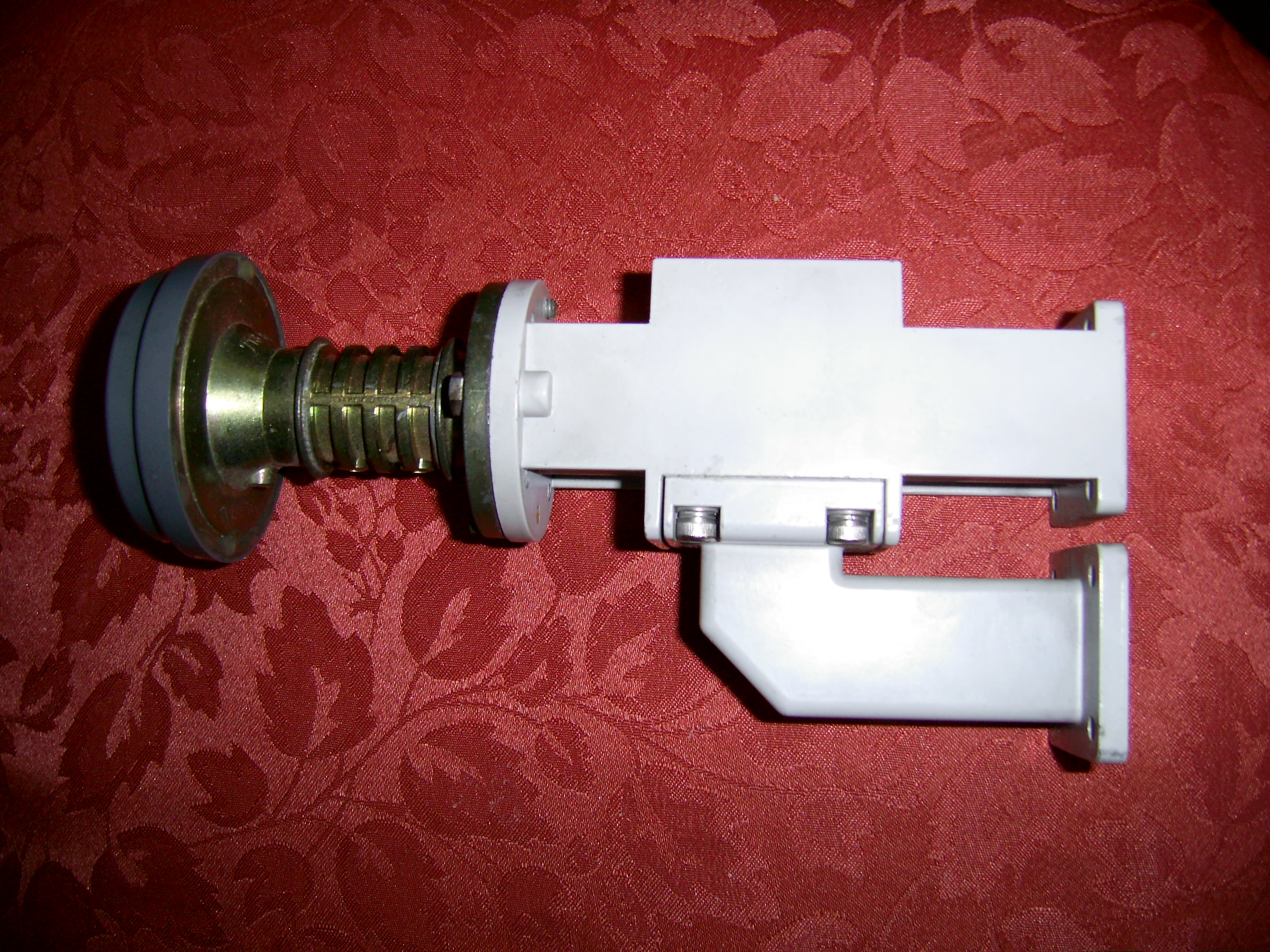
Orthomode transducer (Portenseigne, France)

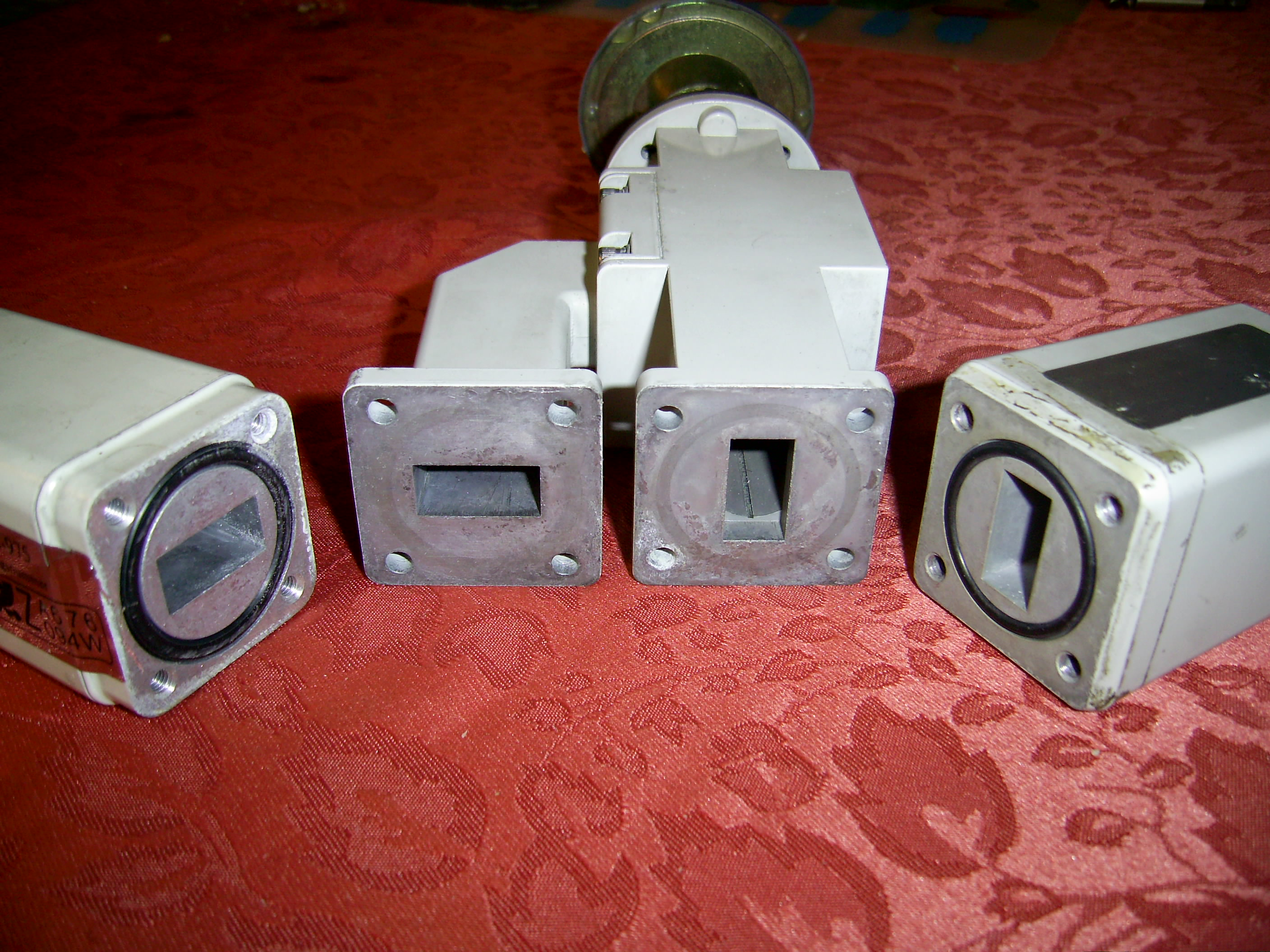
Orthomode transducer, vertical and horizontal polarity

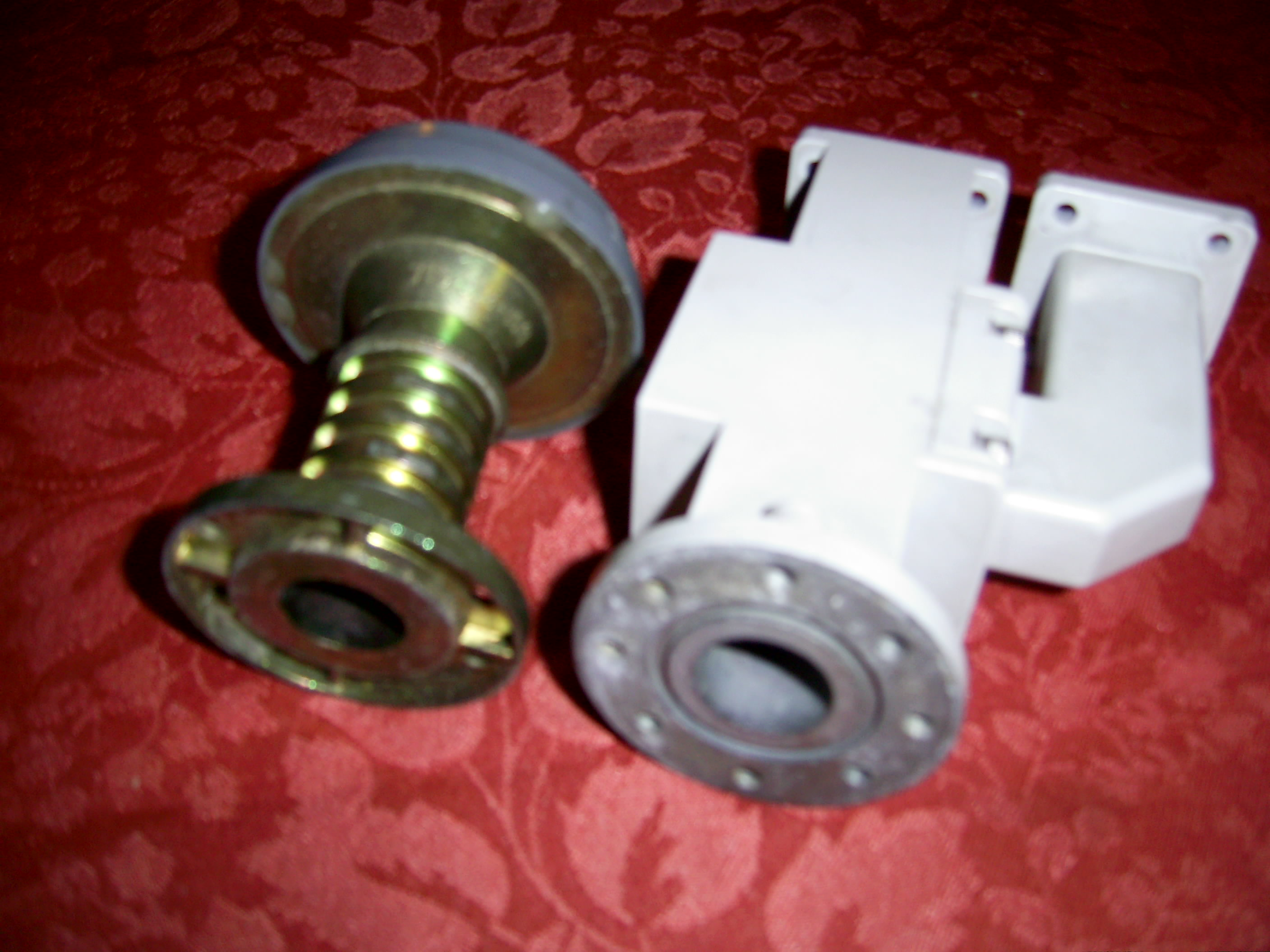
Antenna side of OMT

An orthomode transducer (OMT) is a waveguide component that is commonly referred to as a polarisation duplexer. Orthomode is a contraction of orthogonal mode. Orthomode transducers serve either to combine or to separate two orthogonally polarized microwave signal paths. One of the paths forms the uplink, which is transmitted over the same waveguide as the received signal path, or downlink path. Such a device may be part of a very small aperture terminal (VSAT) antenna feed or a terrestrial microwave radio feed; for example, OMTs are often used with a feed horn to isolate orthogonal polarizations of a signal and to transfer transmit and receive signals to different ports.

== VSAT and satellite Earth station applications ==
For VSAT modems the transmission and reception paths are at 90° to each other, or in other words, the signals are orthogonally polarized with respect to each other. This orthogonal shift between the two signal paths provides approximately an isolation of 40 dB in the K_{u} band and K_{a} band radio frequency bands.

Hence this device serves in an essential role as the junction element of the outdoor unit (ODU) of a VSAT modem. It protects the receiver front-end element (the low-noise block downconverter, LNB) from burn-out (or saturation) by the power of the output signal generated by the block up converter (BUC). The BUC is also connected to the feed horn through a wave guide port of the OMT junction device.

Orthomode transducers are used in dual-polarized VSATs, in sparsely populated areas, radar antennas, radiometers, and communications links. They are usually connected to the antenna's down converter or LNB and to the high-power amplifier (HPA), attached to a transmitting antenna.

When the transmitted and received radio signal to and from the antenna have two different polarizations (horizontal and vertical), they are said to be orthogonal. This means that the modulation planes of the two radio signal waves are at 90 degrees to each other. The OMT device is used to separate two equal frequency signals, but different polarizations, of high and low signal power. Protective separation is essential as the transmitter unit would seriously damage the very sensitive low micro-voltage (μV), front-end receiver amplifier unit at the antenna.

The transmission signal of the up-link, of relatively high power (1, 2, or 5 watts for common VSAT equipment) originating from BUC and the very low power received signal power (in the order of μV) coming from the antenna to the LNB receiver unit, in this case are at an angle of 90° relative to each other, are both coupled together at the feed-horn focal-point of the parabolic antenna. The device that unites both up-link and down-link paths, which are at 90° to each other is the OMT.

In the VSAT K_{u} band of operation case, a typical OMT provides a -40 dB isolation between each of the connected radio ports to the feed horn that faces the parabolic dish reflector (-40 dB means that only 0.01% of the transmitter's output power is cross-fed into the receiver's wave guide port). The port facing the parabolic reflector of the antenna is a circular polarizing port so that horizontal and vertical polarity coupling of inbound and outbound radio signal is easily achieved.

The 40 dB isolation provides essential protection to the very sensitive receiver amplifier against burn out from the relatively high-power signal of the transmitter unit. Further isolation may be obtained by means of selective radio frequency filtering to achieve an isolation of -100 dB (-100 dB means that only a 10^{−10} fraction of the transmitter's output power is cross-fed into the wave guide port of the receiver).

The second image demonstrates two types of outdoor units, a 1-watt Hughes unit and a composite configuration of a 2-watt BUC/OMT/LNB Andrew, Swedish Microwave units.

The following images show a Portenseigne & Hirschmann K_{u} band configuration, that highlights the horizontal the vertical, and circular polarized wave-guide ports that join to the feed-horn, the LNB or BUC elements of an outdoor unit.

== Terrestrial microwave radio links ==
An ortho-mode transducer is also a component commonly found on high capacity terrestrial microwave radio links. In this arrangement, two parabolic reflector dishes operate in a point to point microwave radio path (4 GHz to 85 GHz) with four radios, two mounted on each end. On each dish a T-shaped ortho-mode transducer is mounted at the rear of the feed, separating the signal from the feed into two separate radios, one operating in the horizontal polarity, and the other in the vertical polarity. This arrangement is used to increase the aggregate data throughput between two dishes on a point to point microwave path, or for fault-tolerance redundancy. Certain types of outdoor microwave radios have integrated orthomode transducers and operate in both polarities from a single radio unit, performing cross-polarization interference cancellation (XPIC) within the radio unit itself. Alternatively, the orthomode transducer may be built into the antenna, and allow connection of separate radios, or separate ports of the same radio, to the antenna.

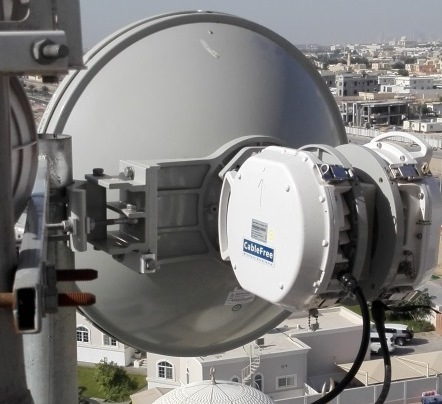
CableFree 2+0 XPIC Microwave Link showing OMT and two ODUs connected to H & V polarity ports

== Characterization ==
An ortho-mode transducer can be modelled as a 4-port device, 2 of these (H and V) representing the single-polarization ports and the remaining (h, v) embodied by the degenerate modes in the dual-polarized port.

The scattering parameters can be gathered in a 4×4 scattering matrix $\boldsymbol{S}$, which is symmetrical for a reciprocal OMT (i.e. not including circulators, isolators or active components), thus leaving 10 independent terms for a general lossy device:

$$\boldsymbol{S}=\begin{bmatrix}
S_{HH} & S_{HV} & S_{Hh} & S_{Hv} \\
S_{HV} & S_{VV} & S_{Vh} & S_{Vv} \\
S_{Hh} & S_{Vh} & S_{hh} & S_{hv} \\
S_{Hv} & S_{Vv} & S_{hv} & S_{vv}
\end{bmatrix}$$

Of these:

- 4 ($S_{HH}$, $S_{VV}$, $S_{hh}$, $S_{vv}$) represent the intrinsic reflection terms of the 4 ports, related to the return loss when all the ports are closed onto ideal loads equal to the port characteristic impedance;
- 2 ($S_{Hh}$, $S_{Vv}$) are the main direct transmission terms (from each single-polarization port to the corresponding mode on the dual-polarized port);
- 2 ($S_{Hv}$, $S_{Vh}$) represent the cross-polarization discrimination (XPD): from each single-polarization port to the supposedly-isolated mode on the dual-polarized port;
- 2 ($S_{HV}$, $S_{hv}$) model the isolation terms (sometimes referred as inter-port isolation, IPI): between the two single-polarized ports and between the two orthogonal modes at the dual-polarized port.

An ideal OMT exhibits perfect matching (null terms on the diagonal), unitary direct transmission terms and infinite XPD and isolation (null corresponding scattering parameters):

$$\boldsymbol{S}=\begin{bmatrix}
0 & 0 & 1 & 0 \\
0 & 0 & 0 & 1 \\
1 & 0 & 0 & 0 \\
0 & 1 & 0 & 0
\end{bmatrix}$$

Characterization of a manufactured OMT (considered the device under test, DUT) is usually a delicate matter for both mechanical and theoretical reasons.

Conceptually, if an ideal OMT is available as part of the measurement setup, often named "golden sample", its dual-polarized port can be connected to its counterpart on the DUT, resulting in a 4-port equivalent device with 4 single-polarization ports. The ideal OMT splits the two polarizations at the dual-polarized port into two standard single-polarized ports and such arrangement allows the direct measurement of all the scattering parameters of the DUT (either by using a 4-port vector network analyzer (VNA) or a 2-port one with 2 single-polarized loads used in several combinations).

Such ideal setup is only prone to mechanical uncertainties related to the physical placement and alignment of the dual-polarized ports. A simple misalignment angle $\epsilon$ introduces an artificial path from each polarization to the opposite proportional to $\sin{\epsilon}$. The phasorial combination of the leakage $S_{Vh}$ (or $S_{Hv}$) due to the XPDs of DUT and this artificial loss $\sin{\epsilon}$ is the actual external measured quantity. If, by proper phase recombination, the two contributions tend to cancel each other, the actual measured XPD can increase to infinity (possible only if $|S_{Vh}|=|\sin\epsilon|$), thus resulting in a huge estimation error.

Depending on the expected XPD of the DUT, mechanical countermeasures should be introduced to guarantee that the artificial measurement uncertainty can be neglected.

Any deviation from this ideal setup, however, introduces errors and uncertainties.

If a dual-polarization matched load is available in place of the ideal OMT, this allows 2×2 measurements from the single-polarization ports, yielding only 2 of the reflection terms ($S_{HH}$ and $S_{HH}$) and one IPI ($S_{HV}$). Other measurements aimed at gaining estimations of the other scattering parameters of the DUT involve the dual-polarized port and require additional components, such as dual-polarized to single-polarized transitions or tapers, which are often not matched on at least one of the two polarizations: this creates undesired reflections which propagate through the OMT and combine at the VNA ports thus preventing direct measurements. These issues add to mechanical factors and enhance uncertainties in the measurement procedure.

Due to the increasing demand for high-capacity data links, the exploitation of dual-polarization has fostered research in design and characterization of OMTs to overcome the practical difficulties. The literature concerning OMT modelling and practical characterization consists of works both by academic organizations such as the National Research Council (Italy), Marche Polytechnic University and European Space Agency and likewise by industrial teams such as CommScope and Siae Microelettronica with immediate impact on products for modern dual-polarized telecommunication systems, for instance in terrestrial microwave backhauling.

== See also ==
- Feed horn
- Waveguide (electromagnetism)
