= Cassegrain antenna =

Type of parabolic antenna with a convex secondary reflector

Types of parabolic antenna

In telecommunications and radar, a Cassegrain antenna is a parabolic antenna in which the feed antenna is mounted at or behind the surface of the concave main parabolic reflector dish and is aimed at a smaller convex secondary reflector suspended in front of the primary reflector. The beam of radio waves from the feed illuminates the secondary reflector, which reflects it back to the main reflector dish, which reflects it forward again to form the desired beam. The Cassegrain design is widely used in parabolic antennas, particularly in large antennas such as those in satellite ground stations, radio telescopes, and communication satellites.

== Geometry ==
The primary reflector is a paraboloid, while the shape of the convex secondary reflector is a hyperboloid. The geometrical condition for radiating a collimated, plane wave beam is that the feed antenna is located at the far focus of the hyperboloid, while the focus of the primary reflector coincides with the near focus of the hyperboloid. Usually the secondary reflector and the feed antenna are located on the central axis of the dish. However, in offset Cassegrain configurations, the primary dish reflector is asymmetric, and its focus, and the secondary reflector, are located to one side of the dish, so that the secondary reflector does not partially obstruct the beam.

== Advantages ==
This design is an alternative to the most common parabolic antenna design, called "front feed" or "prime focus", in which the feed antenna itself is mounted suspended in front of the dish at the focus, pointed back toward the dish. The Cassegrain is a more complex design, but in certain applications it has advantages over front feed that can justify its increased complexity:

- The feed antennas and associated waveguides and "front end" electronics can be located on or behind the dish, rather than suspended in front where they block part of the outgoing beam. Therefore, this design is used for antennas with bulky or complicated feeds, such as satellite communication ground antennas, radio telescopes, and the antennas on some communication satellites.
- Another advantage, important in satellite ground antennas and radio telescopes, is that because the feed antenna is directed forward, rather than backward toward the dish as in a front-fed antenna, the spillover sidelobes caused by portions of the beam that miss the secondary reflector are directed upwards toward the cold sky rather than downwards towards the warm earth. In receiving antennas this reduces reception of ground noise, resulting in a lower antenna noise temperature.
- Dual reflector shaping: The presence of a second reflecting surface in the signal path allows additional opportunities for tailoring the radiation pattern for maximum performance. For example, the gain of ordinary parabolic antennas is reduced because the radiation of the feed antenna falls off toward the outer parts of the dish, resulting in lower "illumination" of those parts. In "dual reflector shaping" the shape of the secondary reflector is altered to direct more signal power to outer areas of the dish, resulting in more uniform illumination of the primary, to maximize the gain. However, this results in a secondary that is no longer precisely hyperbolic (though it is still very close), so the constant phase property is lost. This phase error, however, can be compensated for by slightly tweaking the shape of the primary mirror. The result is a higher gain, or gain/spillover ratio, at the cost of surfaces that are trickier to fabricate and test. Other dish illumination patterns can also be synthesized, such as patterns with high taper at the dish edge for ultra-low spillover sidelobes, and patterns with a central "hole" to reduce feed shadowing.
- Another reason for using the Cassegrain design is to increase the focal length of the antenna, to reduce sidelobes, among other advantages. Parabolic reflectors used in dish antennas have a large curvature and short focal length; the focal point is located near the mouth of the dish, to reduce the length of the supports required to hold the feed structure or secondary reflector. The focal ratio (f-number, the ratio of the focal length to the dish diameter) of typical parabolic antennas is 0.25–0.8, compared to 3–8 for parabolic mirrors used in optical systems such as telescopes. In a front-fed antenna, a "flatter" parabolic dish with a long focal length would require an impractically elaborate support structure to hold the feed rigid with respect to the dish. However, the drawback of this small focal ratio is that the antenna is sensitive to small deviations from the focal point: the angular width that it can effectively focus is small. Modern parabolic antennas in radio telescopes and communications satellites often use arrays of feedhorns clustered around the focal point, to create a particular beam pattern. These require the good off-axis focusing characteristics of a large focal ratio, and because the convex secondary reflector of the Cassegrain antenna increases it significantly, these antennas typically use a Cassegrain design.
- The longer focal length also improves crosspolarization discrimination of off-axis feeds, important in satellite antennas that use the two orthogonal polarization modes to transmit separate channels of information.

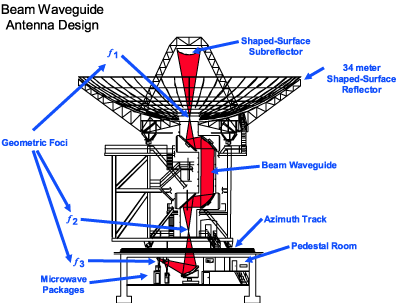
A beam waveguide antenna, a type of Cassegrain design, showing the complicated signal path.

A disadvantage of the Cassegrain is that the feed horn(s) must have a narrower beamwidth (higher gain) to focus its radiation on the smaller secondary reflector, instead of the wider primary reflector as in front-fed dishes. The angular width the secondary reflector subtends at the feed horn is typically 10–15°, as opposed to 120–180° the main reflector subtends in a front-fed dish. Therefore, the feed horn must be longer for a given wavelength.

== Beam waveguide antenna ==
A beam waveguide antenna is a type of complicated Cassegrain antenna with a long radio wave path to allow the feed electronics to be located at ground level. It is used in very large steerable radio telescopes and satellite ground antennas, where the feed electronics are too complicated and bulky, or requires too much maintenance and alterations, to locate on the dish; for example those using cryogenically cooled amplifiers. The beam of incoming radio waves from the secondary reflector is reflected by additional mirrors in a long twisting path through the axes of the altazimuth mount, so the antenna can be steered without interrupting the beam, and then down through the antenna tower to a feed building at ground level.

== History ==
The Cassegrain antenna design was adapted from the Cassegrain telescope, a type of reflecting telescope developed around 1672 and attributed to French Province England priest Laurent Cassegrain. The first Cassegrain antenna was invented and patented by Cochrane and Whitehead at Elliot Bros in Borehamwood, England, in 1952. The patent, British Patent Number 700868, was subsequently challenged in court, but prevailed. The Voyager 1 spacecraft launched in 1977 is, as of September 2024, 24.6 billion kilometers from Earth, the furthest manmade object in space, and its 3.7 meter S and X-band Cassegrain antenna (picture below) is still able to communicate with ground stations.

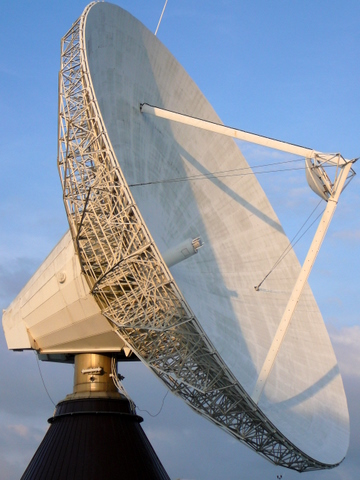
Cassegrain satellite communication antenna in Sweden. The convex secondary reflector can be seen suspended above the dish, and the feed horn is visible projecting from the center of the dish.

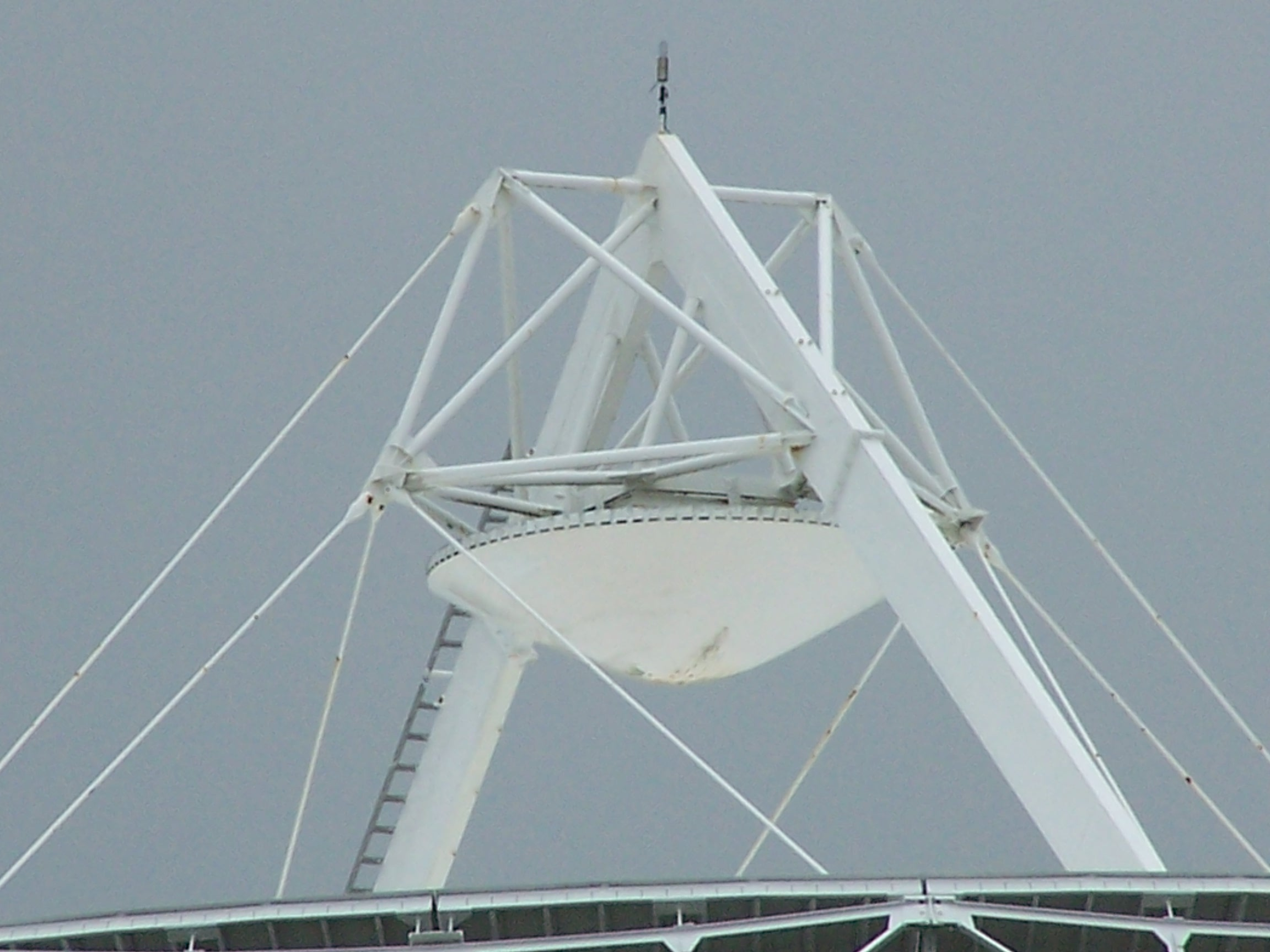
Closeup of the convex secondary reflector in a large satellite communications antenna in Pleumeur-Bodou, France

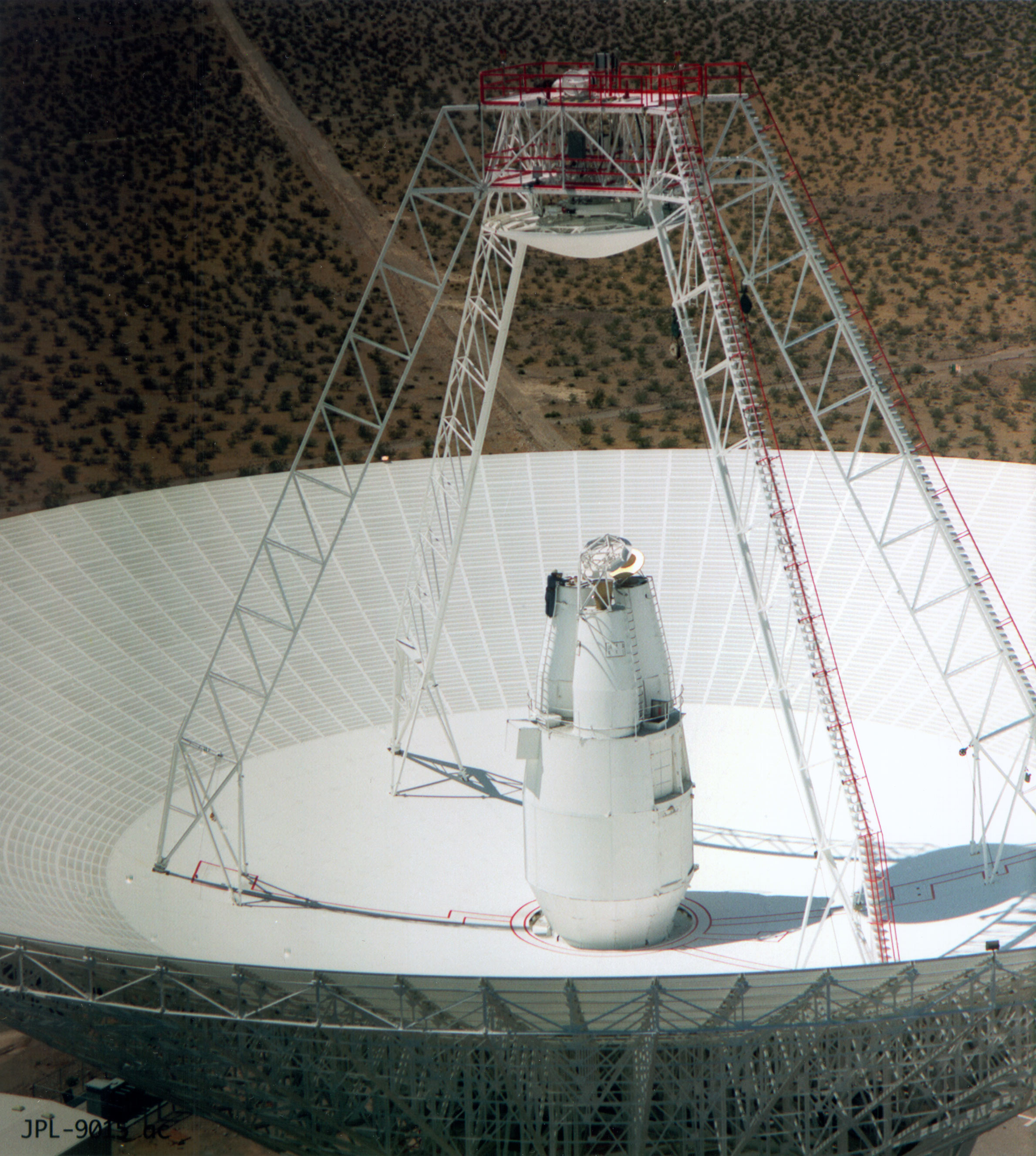
Cassegrain spacecraft communication antenna in Goldstone, California, part of NASA's Deep Space Network. The advantage of the Cassegrain design is that the heavy complicated feed structure (bottom) doesn't have to be suspended over the dish.

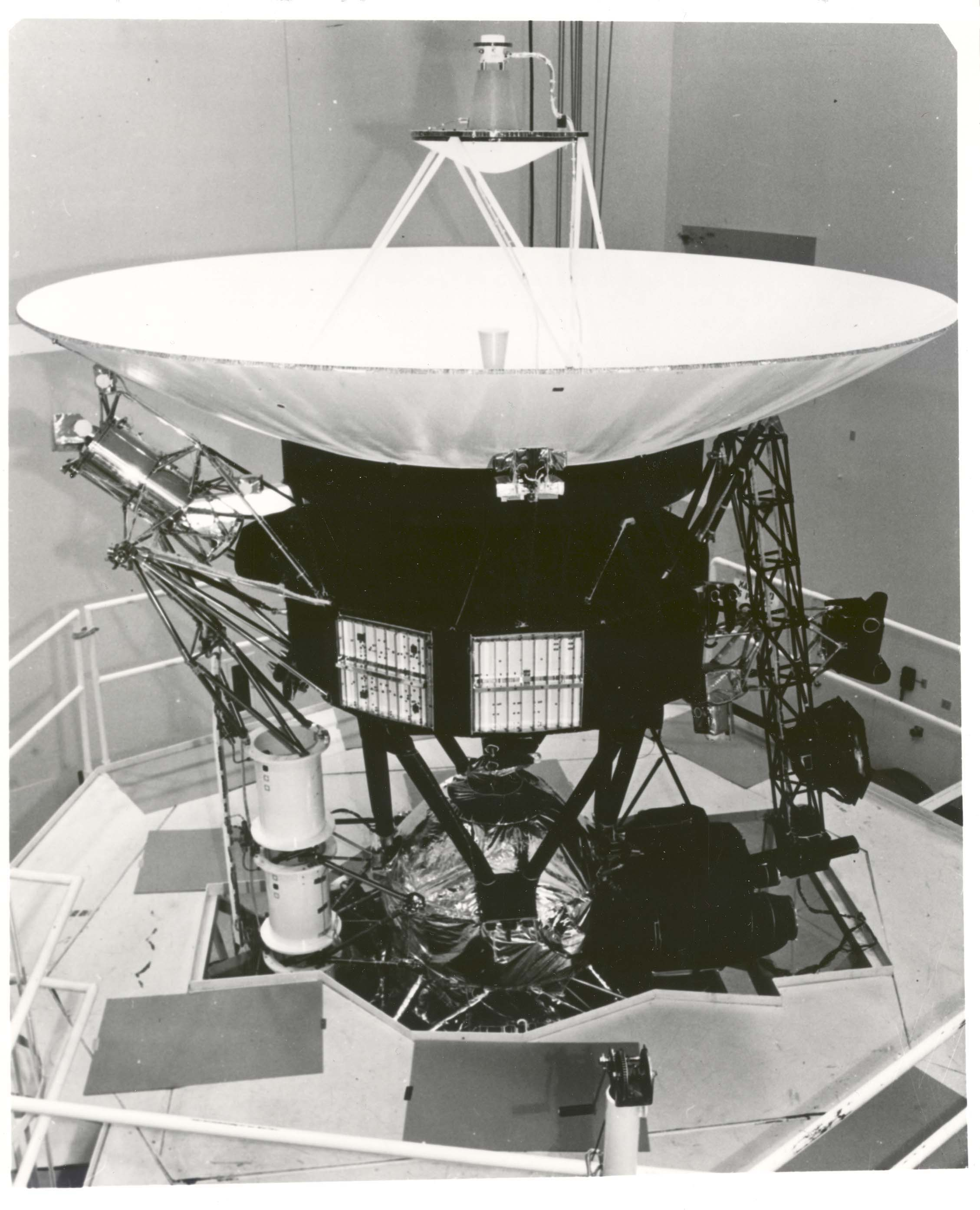
Cassegrain antenna on the Voyager spacecraft

== See also ==
- Cassegrain reflector
- Nasmyth telescope
