= Upconversion =

Upconversion, upconverter, or upconverting may refer to:

- Scaling of a video signal to higher resolution
- Up- and down-conversion of analog signals (heterodyning)
- Photon upconversion
- Block upconverter
