= Ruze's equation =

Ruze's equation is an equation relating the gain of an antenna to the root mean square (RMS) of the antenna's random surface errors. The equation was originally developed for parabolic reflector antennas, and later extended to phased arrays. The equation is named after John Ruze, who introduced the equation in a paper he wrote in 1952. The equation states that the antenna's gain is inversely proportional to the exponential of the square of the RMS surface errors. Mathematically, the equation for parabolic reflector antennas can be expressed as:

$G\left(\epsilon\right)=G_0\,\, e^{-\left(\frac{4\pi\epsilon}{\lambda}\right)^2}$

where $\displaystyle\epsilon$ is the surface RMS errors of the reflector, $\displaystyle\lambda$ is the wavelength, and $\displaystyle G_0$ is the gain of the antenna in the absence of surface errors.

The equation is often expressed in decibels as:

$G\left(\epsilon\right)=g_0\,-\, 685.81 \left(\frac{\epsilon}{\lambda}\right)^2$ (dB)

where the -685.81 coefficient is the numerical value of $10\log_{10}\left(e^{{-\left(4\pi\right)}^2}\right)$ and $g_0=10\log_{10}G_0$

== Application to phased array ==
Ruze's equation, which was originally derived for parabolic reflectors has been extended to phased array applications. For phased arrays, the equation is slightly modified, differing by a factor of 2 in the exponential, to give

$G\left(\epsilon\right)=G_0\,\, e^{-\left(\frac{2\pi\epsilon}{\lambda}\right)^2}$

The factor of 2 difference between the equation for the phased array and the equation for reflectors is that the electromagnetic wave goes in only one direction for phased arrays, but it goes back and forth in reflectors (the wave is reflected).

Consequently, when expressed in dB, Ruze's equation for phased arrays has a different coefficient, namely:

$G\left(\epsilon\right)=g_0\,-\, 171.45 \left(\frac{\epsilon}{\lambda}\right)^2$ (dB)

where $\displaystyle\epsilon$ is the RMS of the z-directed positional errors of the array elements, and as before, $\displaystyle\lambda$ is the wavelength.
