= Parabolic torus reflector antenna =

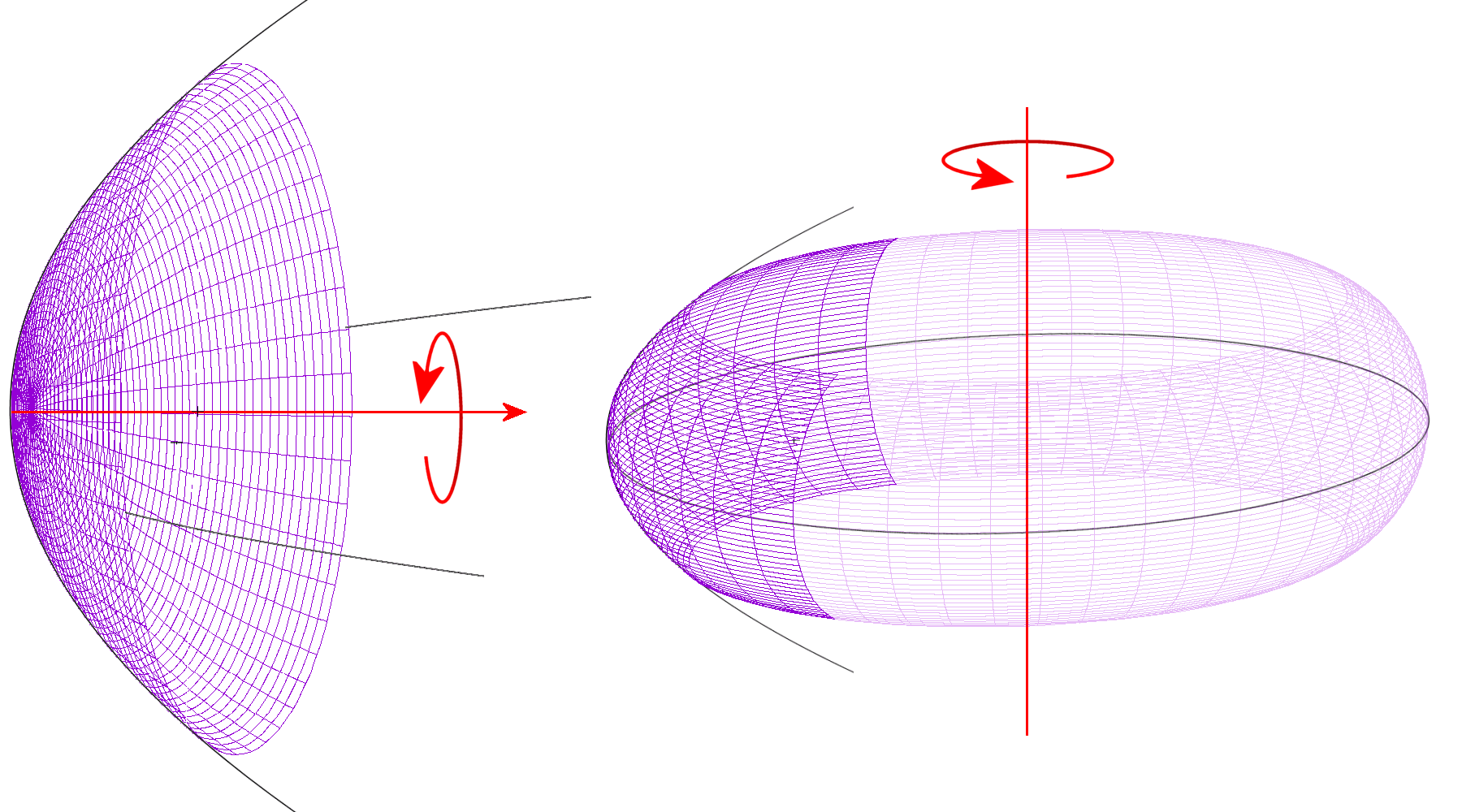
Form of classic parabolic dish antenna and parabolic torus reflector antenna

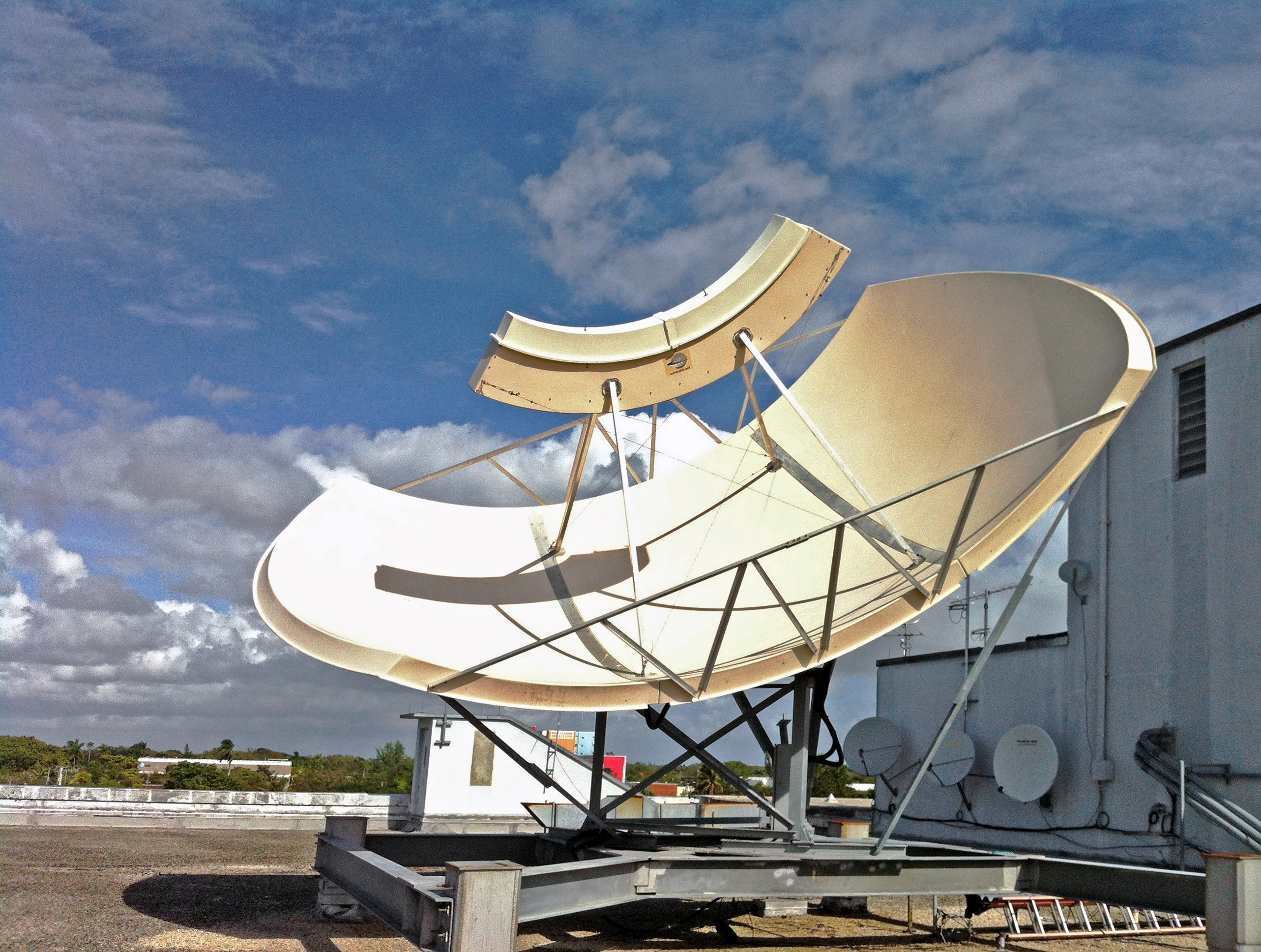
Simulsat antenna in Miami with casing for several LNBs

A parabolic torus reflector antenna is a quasi-parabolic antenna, where the defining parabola is not rotated around the main transmission axis, but around an axis which stands perpendicular to this axis.

Simulsat is a trademark for such antennas designed and manufactured by Antenna Technology Communications.

Whereas parabolic satellite dishes with one low-noise block converter (LNB) are able to receive a satellite television broadcast from one communications satellite at a time, parabolic torus reflector antennas are capable of establishing views to more than 40 C and K_{u} band satellites simultaneously, by employing multiple LNBs.

== Literature ==
- Alan G. P. Boswell: The parabolic torus reflector antenna. In: Marconi Review, 41, 1978, pp. 237–248.
- Biao Du, Edward K. N. Yung, Ke-Zhong Yang, Shun-Shi Zhong: Design of multibeam parabolic torus reflector antennas. In: Microwave and Optical Technology Letters, 27, 5, 2000, pp. 343–347.
- Kenneth S. Kelleher: A new wide-angle microwave reflector. In: Tele-Tech & Electronic Industries, 12, 6, 1953, pp. 98–99, 168–169.
