= Offset dish antenna =

Type of parabolic antenna

Main types of parabolic antennas

An offset dish antenna or off-axis dish antenna is a type of parabolic antenna whose antenna feed is offset to the side of the reflector, in contrast to the common "front-feed" parabolic antenna where the feed antenna is suspended in front of the dish, on its axis. As in a front-fed parabolic dish, the feed is located at the focal point of the reflector, but the reflector is an asymmetric segment of a paraboloid, so the focus is located to the side.

The purpose of this design is to move the feed antenna and its supports out of the path of the incoming radio waves. In an ordinary front-fed dish antenna, the feed structure and its supports are located in the path of the incoming beam of radio waves, partially obstructing them, casting a "shadow" on the dish, reducing the radio power received. In technical terms this reduces the aperture efficiency of the antenna, reducing its gain. In the offset design, the feed is positioned outside the area of the beam, usually below it on a boom sticking out from the bottom edge of the dish. The beam axis of the antenna, the axis of the incoming or outgoing radio waves, is skewed at an angle to the plane of the dish mouth.

The design is most widely used for small parabolic antennas or "mini-dishes", such as common K_{u} band home satellite television dishes, where the feed structure is large enough in relation to the dish to block a significant proportion of the signal. Another application is on satellites, particularly the direct broadcast satellites which use parabolic dishes to beam television signals to homes on Earth. Because of the limited transmitter power provided by their solar cells, satellite antennas must function as efficiently as possible. The offset design is also widely used in radar antennas. These must collect as much signal as possible in order to detect faint return signals from faraway targets.

Offset dish antennas are more difficult to design than front-fed antennas because the dish is an asymmetric segment of a paraboloid with different curvatures in the two axes. Before the 1970s offset designs were mostly limited to radar antennas, which required asymmetric reflectors anyway to create shaped beams. The advent in the 1970s of computer design tools which could easily calculate the radiation pattern of offset dishes has removed this limitation, and efficient offset designs are being used more and more widely in recent years.

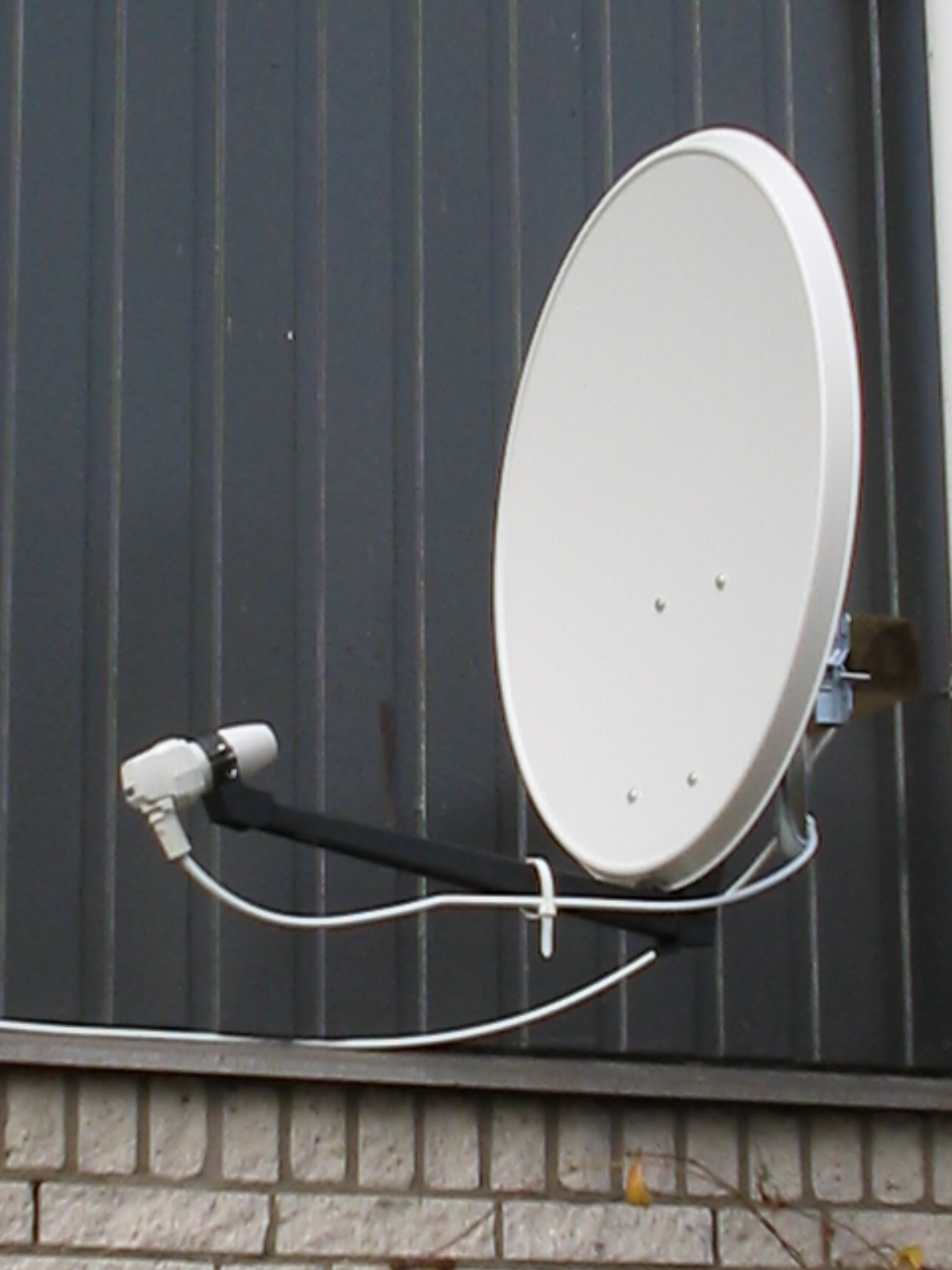
Home satellite television dish.

== See also ==
- Axi-symmetric
