= Block upconverter =

Device used in the transmission of satellite signals

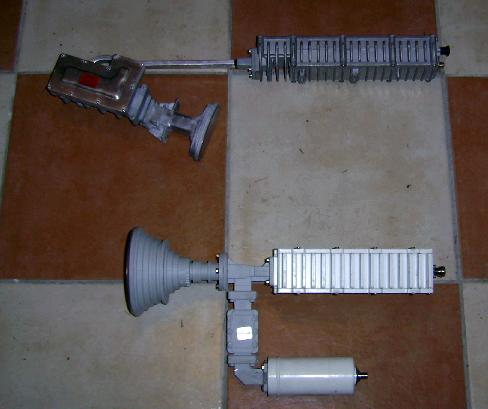
BUC: Block upconverter, K_{u} band Top: Hughes 1W Bottom: Feed horn with short section of waveguide, Andrew 2W BUC and Swedish microwave LNB

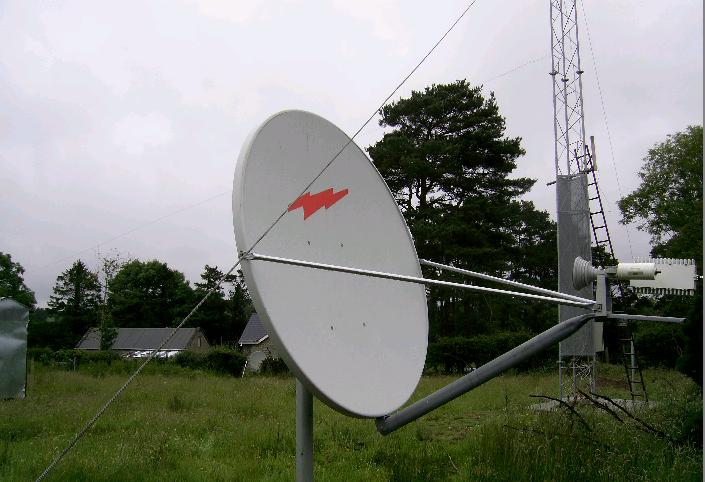
BUC: Block upconverter, K_{u} band 1.2 Andrew dish assembly

A block upconverter (BUC) is a component used in the transmission (uplink) of satellite signals. It converts a band of frequencies from a lower frequency to a higher frequency. Modern BUCs convert from the L band to K_{u} band, C band and K_{a} band. Older BUCs convert from a 70 MHz intermediate frequency (IF) to K_{u} band or C band.

Most BUCs use phase-locked loop local oscillators and require an external 10 MHz frequency reference to maintain the correct transmit frequency.

BUCs used in remote locations are often 2 or 4 W in the K_{u} band and 5 W in the C band. The 10 MHz reference frequency is usually sent on the same feedline as the main carrier. Many smaller BUCs also get their direct current (DC) over the feedline, using an internal DC block.

BUCs are generally used in conjunction with low-noise block converters (LNB). The BUC, being an up-converting device, makes up the "transmit" side of the system, while the LNB is the down-converting device and makes up the "receive" side. An example of a system utilizing both a BUC and an LNB is a VSAT system, used for bidirectional Internet access via satellite.

The block upconverter is a block shaped device assembled with the LNB in association with an OMT, orthogonal mode transducer to the feed-horn that faces the reflector parabolic dish. This is opposed to other types of frequency upconverter which may be rack mounted indoors or not co-located with the dish.
