= Feed horn =

Type of antenna

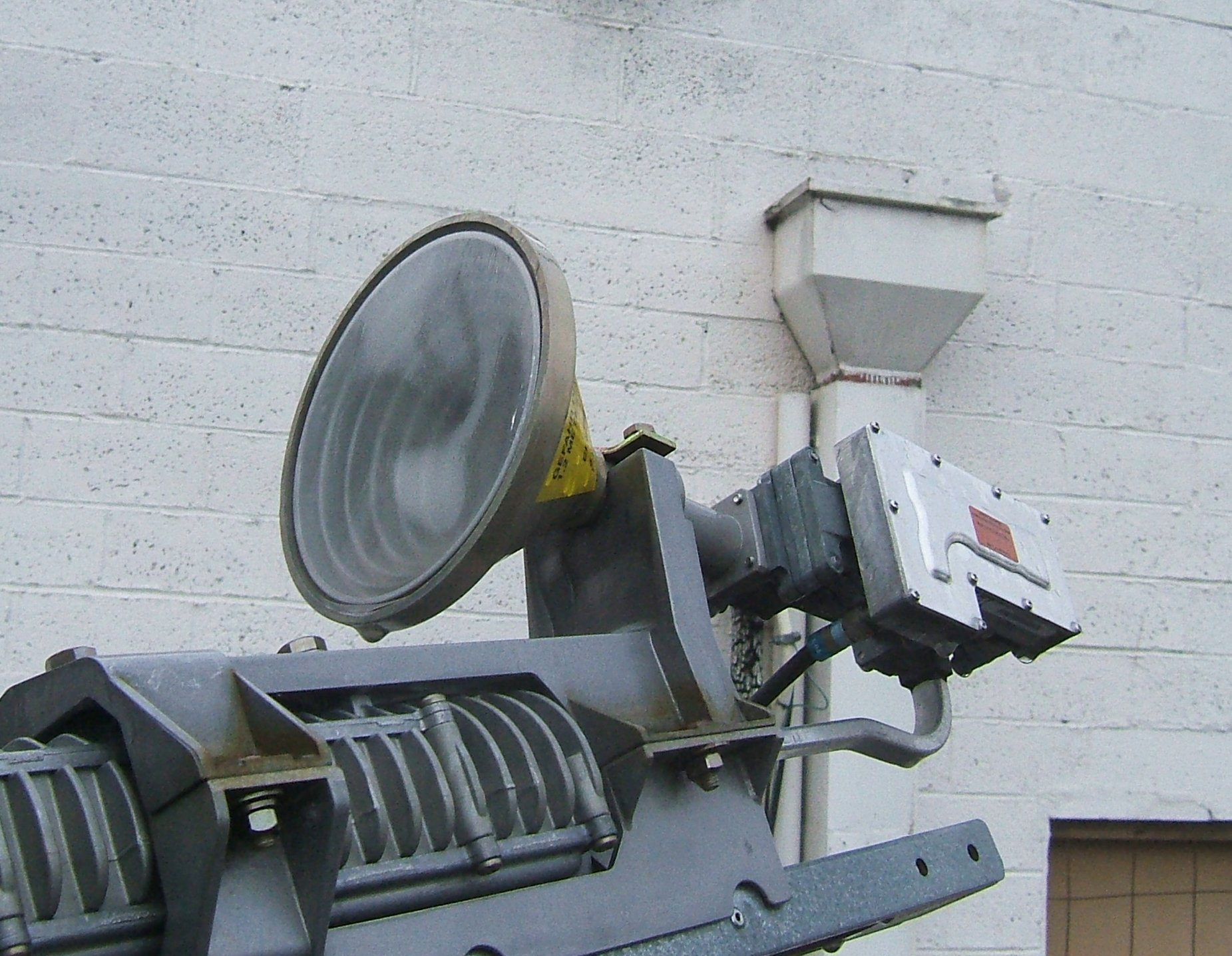
Feed horn with concentric rings (left) and LNB (right) on a Hughes DirecWay home satellite dish.

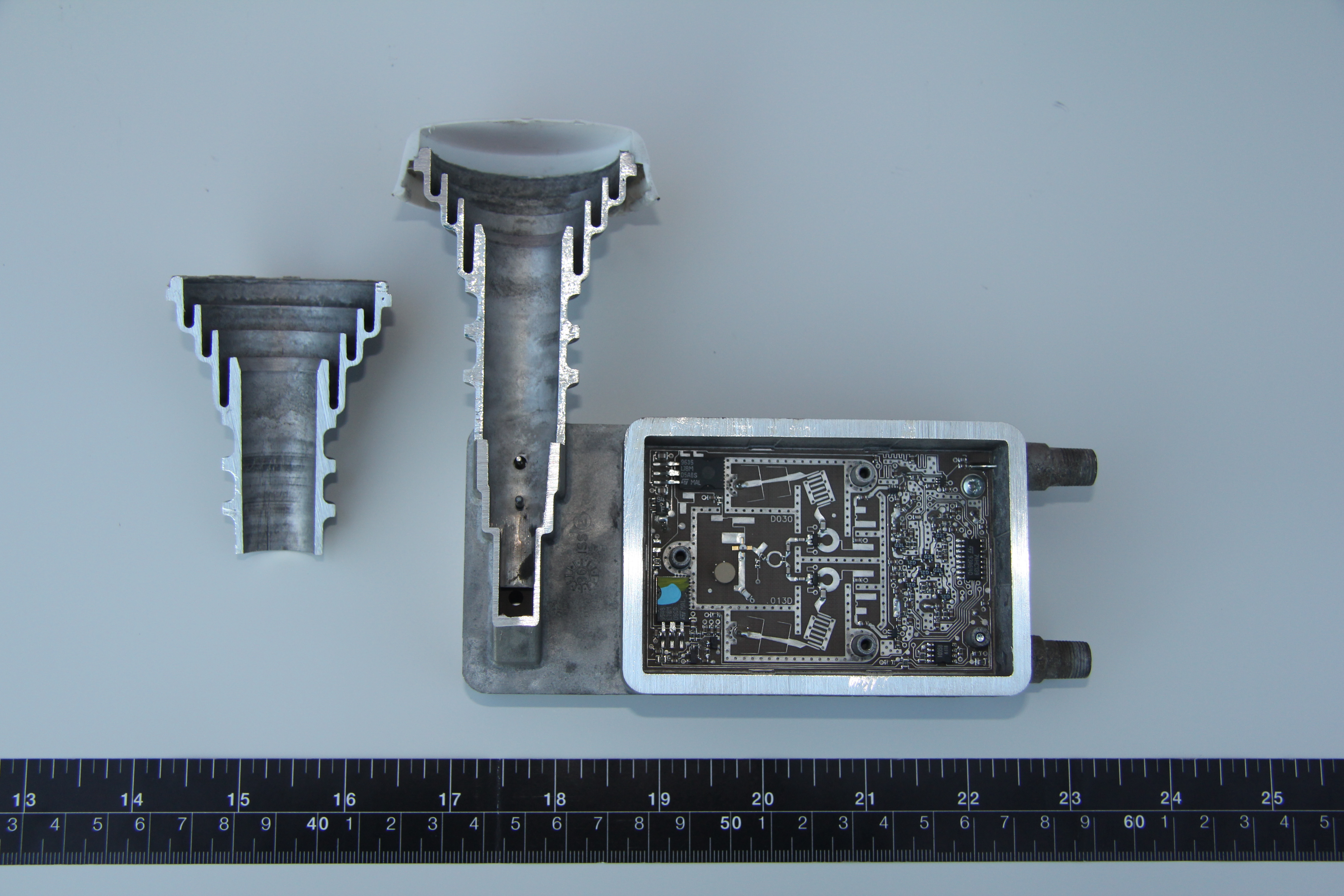
An LNBF (LNB with integrated feed horn) that has been cut into two. Visible is the scalar horn antenna (the funnel with concentric rings), which couples the microwave beam into a short waveguide (the tube connecting the feed horn to the LNB electronics part of the LNBF).

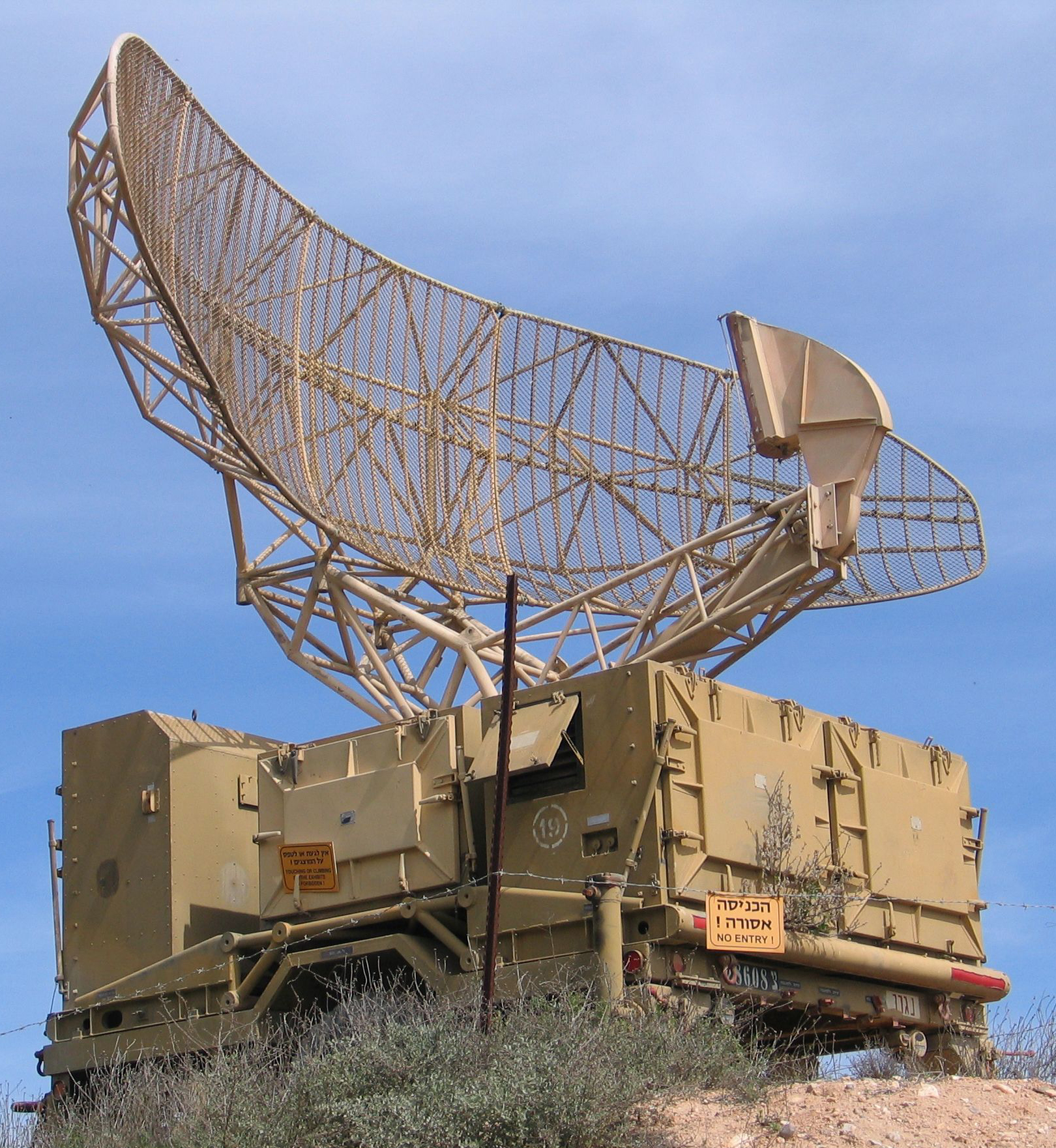
Feed horn (right) on a military radar antenna. The feed horn must be shaped to produce a radiation pattern tailored to adequately illuminate the reflector.

A feed horn (or feedhorn) is a small horn antenna used to couple a waveguide to e.g. a parabolic dish antenna or offset dish antenna for reception or transmission of microwaves. A typical application is the use for satellite television reception with a satellite dish. In that case the feed horn can either be a separate part used together with e.g. a "low-noise block downconverter" (LNB), or more typically today is integrated into a "low-noise block feedhorn" (LNBF).

== Principle of operation ==
The feed horn minimizes the mismatch loss between the antenna and the waveguide. If a simple open-ended waveguide would be used, without the horn, the sudden end of the conductive walls causes an abrupt impedance change at the aperture, between the wave impedance in the waveguide and the impedance of free space (see horn antenna for more details).

When used with a offset, parabolic or lens antenna, the phase center of the horn is placed at the focal point of the reflector. The characteristic of the feed horn is usually selected with the 3 dB points of the horn's radiation pattern falling on the edge of the reflector (the beamwidth of the horn matching the F/D ratio of the dish). When the shape of the antenna deviates from a circular dish, the feedhorn needs to be shaped accordingly to illuminate the antenna properly.

== Applications ==
For satellite TV reception the feedhorn is mounted at the feed arm of the satellite dish. The feedhorn then connects via a short waveguide to the "low-noise block downconverter" (LNB), a small housing containing a part of the reception electronics (also called the "RF front end"). This LNB converts the high satellite microwave downlink frequencies to lower frequencies, so the TV signals can be more easily transmitted through coaxial cables to receivers located anywhere inside a building. For DTH TV typically the LNB and the feedhorn are integrated into one unit called "low-noise block feedhorn" (LNBF), but separate feedhorns and LNBs are used for more specialized applications.

For satellite uplink (e.g. for transmission of "Direct-To-Home" DTH TV programs, satellite news gathering SNG, satellite internet access or VSAT applications) a block upconverter (BUC) connects via a waveguide to the feedhorn, in order to transmit via the satellite dish to the communications satellite.

Feedhorns are also used in applications like radar, line-of-sight microwave transmission or radio astronomy.

== See also ==
- Focal cloud
- Horn antenna
