= Fixed-focus lens =

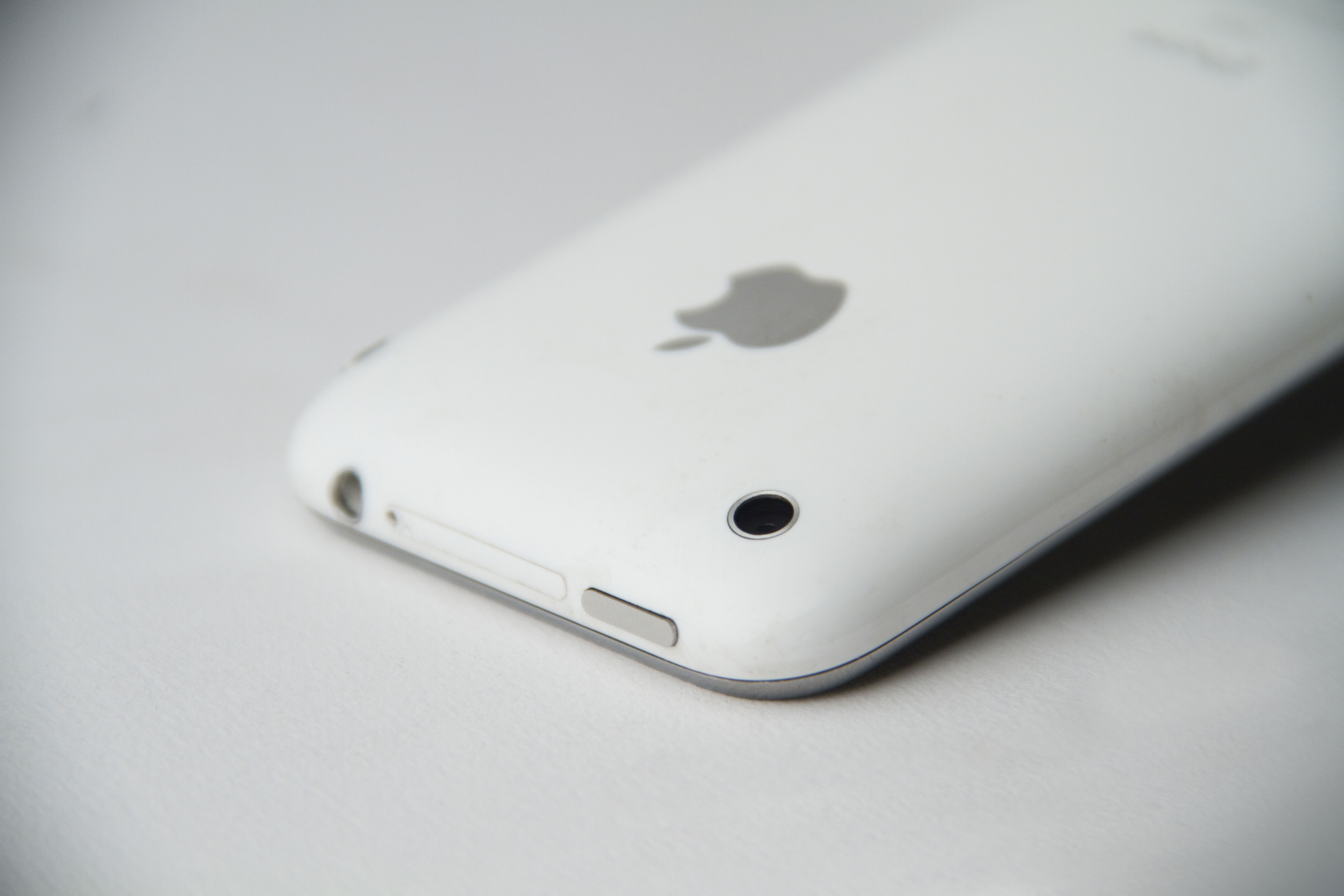
The back of an iPhone 3G, showing its small fixed-focus lens

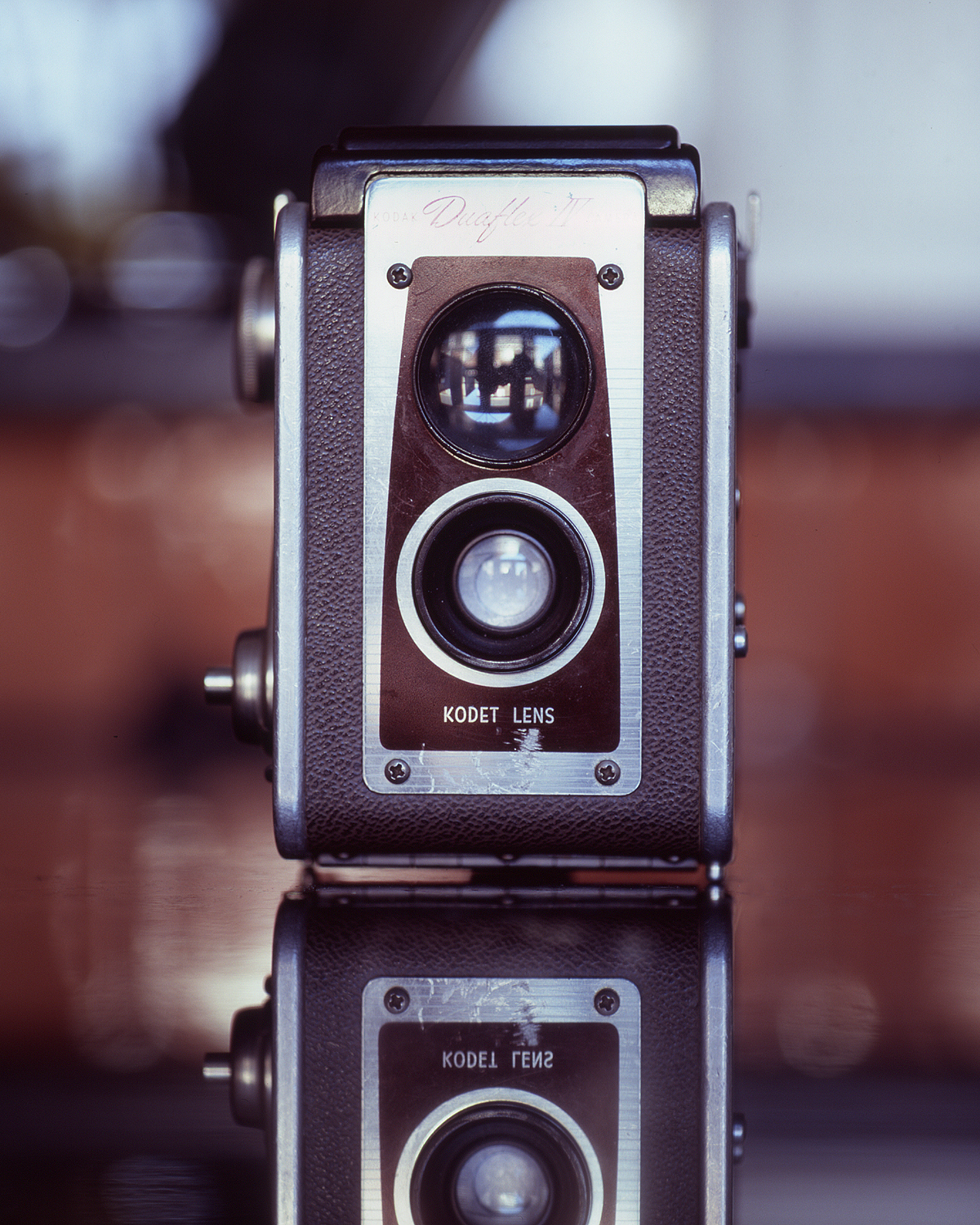
Mid-20th-century medium-format fixed-focus camera

A photographic lens for which the focus is not adjustable is called a fixed-focus lens or sometimes focus-free. The focus is set at the time of lens design, and remains fixed. It is usually set to the hyperfocal distance, so that the depth of field ranges all the way down from half that distance to infinity, which is acceptable for most cameras used for capturing images of humans or objects larger than a meter.

Rather than having a method of determining the correct focusing distance and setting the lens to that focal point, a fixed-focus lens relies on sufficient depth of field to produce acceptably sharp images. Most cameras with focus-free lenses also have a relatively small aperture, which increases the depth of field. Fixed-focus cameras with extended depth of field (EDOF) sometimes are known as full-focus cameras.

== Concept ==
In order to reach a minimal focal distance, the aperture and the focal length of the lens are reduced (a slow wide-angle lens), to make the hyperfocal distance small. This allows the depth of field to extend from a short distance to infinity.

A disadvantage of this is there will be reduction in light that will reach the film or sensor through the small aperture, since the narrower opening lets less light in. That means that these types of lenses are usually not suitable for fast-moving objects which require short exposure times to freeze motion – see lens speed. The amount of collected light can be increased by opening the angle of view, which is achieved with an even shorter focal length resulting in a wide-angle lens. Telephoto lenses are not feasible at a reasonable lens speed.

The advantage of this design is that it can be produced very inexpensively, more so than autofocus or manual focus systems. The system is also effectively automatic; the photographer need not worry about the focal point for a given scene. Fixed-focus lenses are unable to produce sharp close-ups, or images of objects that are only a fraction of the hyperfocal distance from the camera which, depending on factors including the size of the camera, may be within 2.4–3.7 meters (7.9–12.1 feet).

== Applications ==
Fixed focus can be a less expensive alternative to autofocus, which requires electronics, moving parts, and power. Since fixed-focus lenses require no input from the operator, they are suitable for use in cameras designed to be inexpensive, or to operate without electrical power as in disposable cameras, or in low-end 35 mm film point and shoot cameras, or in cameras featuring simple operation. These are usually wide-angle lenses with fixed aperture, and cameras with these lenses generally use a viewfinder for composition.

Especially suitable are fixed-focus lenses for low-resolution CCD cameras as found in webcams, surveillance cameras and camera phones, because the low resolution of the image sensor allows a loose focusing on the CCD without noticeable loss of image quality. This makes a bigger circle of confusion and smaller hyperfocal distance.

Special-purpose cameras such as the Agiflite are used for situations like aerial photography from aircraft. Because the ground is far from the camera, focus adjustment is not necessary. Light-field cameras use fixed-focus lenses, since the focus can be set when the picture is displayed. For 35 mm cameras, some superwide fixed-focus lenses have been made.

== See also ==
- Autofocus
- Prime lens
