= Depssi =

The Depssi card (Depth of field, sunrise, sunset indicator) is a handy guide/reference card that has two functions; it enables the outdoor photographer to quickly select the hyperfocal distance for different lenses (or zoom settings) using various apertures. On the reverse side of the card, there are the angles/positions of sunrise and sunset for every month.

The card is made in a durable plastic suitable for prolonged use. The size of a credit card, it can be tucked into a wallet/purse or secured to your camera bag until needed.
