= PKS 1335−127 =

Blazar in the constellation Virgo

PKS 1335-127
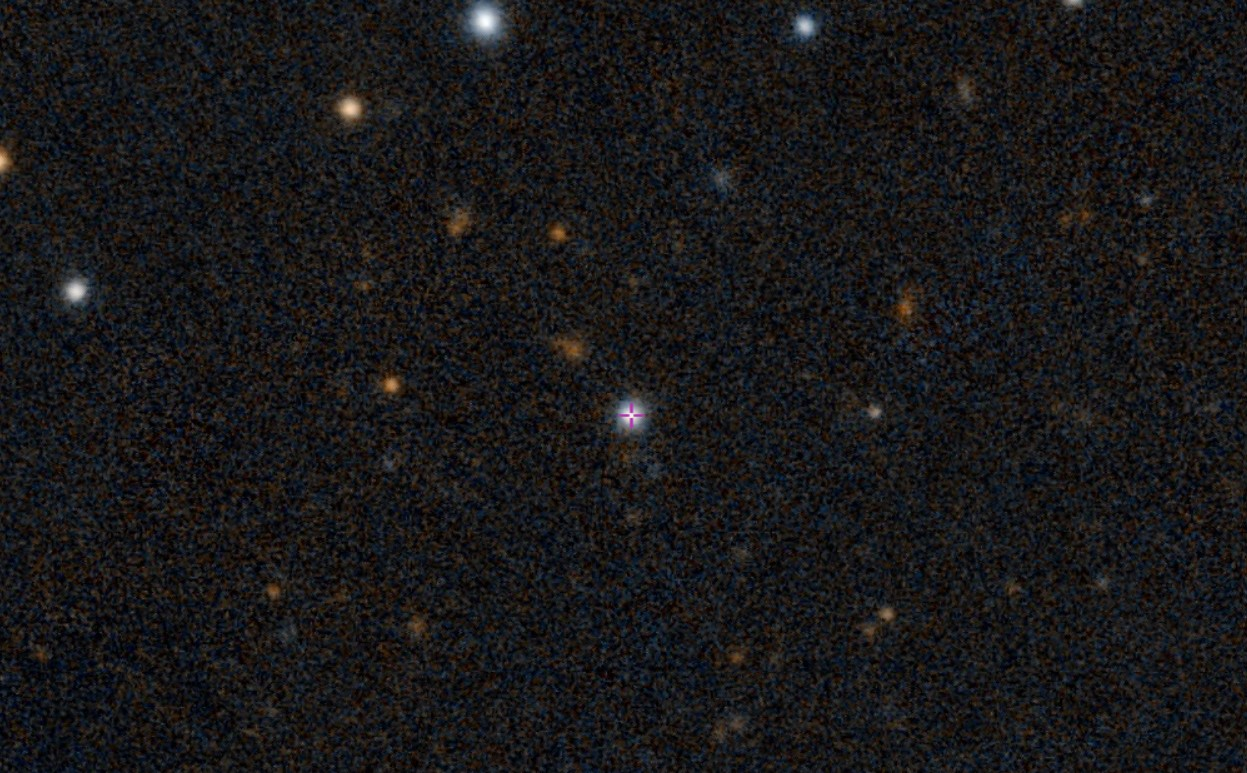
- The blazar PKS 1335-127.

Observation data (J2000.0 epoch)
- Constellation: Virgo
- Right ascension: 13^{h} 37^{m} 39.7828^{s}
- Declination: −12° 57′ 24.693″
- Redshift: 0.539000
- Heliocentric radial velocity: 161,588 km/s
- Distance: 5.153 gly
- Apparent magnitude (V): 19.00
- Apparent magnitude (B): 18.5

Characteristics
- Type: Opt var; HPQ, BL LAC

Other designations
- INTREF 569, LEDA 2827642, WMAP 188, QSO B1334-127, OHIO P 158.3, TXS 1334-127

PKS 1335-127 is a blazar located in the constellation of Virgo with a redshift of (z) 0.539. This is a compact BL Lac object containing a radio source of extragalactic origins; discovered in 1970 during the continuum survey conducted by astronomers from Ohio State University. The object shows a radio spectrum appearing as flat, thus making it a flat-spectrum radio quasar (FRSQ), but also classified as a gigahertz-peaked source (GPS) with high polarization.

== Description ==
PKS 1335-127 is considered to be variable on the electromagnetic spectrum. It is known to produce a near-infrared flare which was detected in February 2013 showing a H-band flux value of 13.691 ± 0.08. Enhanced gamma-ray activity was observed from the object in May 2020, followed by an optical flare one month later. There is presence of large amplitude variability and evidence of position angles showing different rotations at both low and high frequencies from the object.

Radio imaging made by the Very Long Baseline Array on arcsecond scales, shows the structure of PKS 1335-127 is mainly made up of a radio core and a radio jet that is found to curve in an eastwards direction by 6.5" from the core. When imaged at 43 GHz, the jet is revealed to become less defined, with a patch of weak diffused radio emission located southeast. There is also an extended component located at a 152° position angle at a distance of 2.6 milliarcseconds. Earlier observations via a very-long baseline Interferometry (VLBI) map shows the core as unresolved while the jet is found to have an orientation of 135° indicating a perpendicular magnetic field.

Further observations also found the circular polarization in PKS 1335-127 is stable. While images at 15 and 22 GHz respectively shows the presence of compact radio emission focused on the phase center, the image at 43 GHz shows PKS 1335-127 has a double structure containing components with a much stronger southern component. There is also circular polarization towards the jet at its southwestern edge, polarized by 7.16 percent; however it is found 2 factor higher when compared to circular polarization in the jet of 3C 84 (NGC 1275).
