= Focal cloud =

Aspect of a lens or reflector

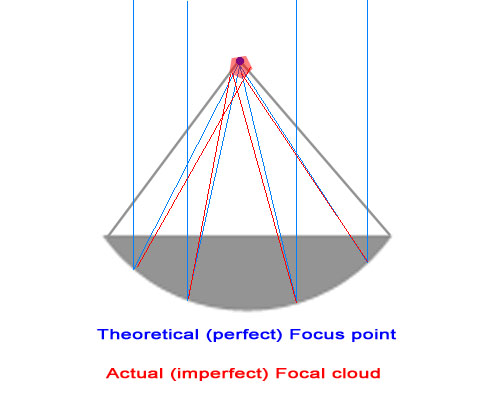
Focal cloud of a reflector (red) compared to an ideal focal point (blue)

A focal cloud is the collection of focal points of an imperfect lens or parabolic reflector whether optical, electrostatic or electromagnetic. This includes parabolic antennas and lens-type reflective antennas of all kinds. The effect is analogous to the circle of confusion in photography.

In a perfect lens or parabolic reflector, rays parallel to the device's axis striking the lens or reflector all pass through a single point, the focal point. In an imperfectly constructed lens or reflector, rays passing through different parts of the element do not converge to a single point but have different focal points. The set of these focal points forms a region called the focal cloud. The diameter of the focal cloud determines the maximum resolution of the optical system. Lens-reflector artifacts, geometry and other imperfections determine the actual diameter of the focal cloud.

== Satellite dish effects ==
A focal cloud can render a satellite dish less efficient, resulting in a reduced gain. The imperfections of the antenna lead to two problems: On the one hand the more the radio waves are directed away from the phase center of the feed horn, the more attenuated they get coupled into the waveguide. On the other hand, the more the distance between antenna surface and feed horn varies, the bigger the phase shift gets - the closer the phase shift gets to 180 degrees (half a wavelength) between different parts of the antenna surface, the more the signal gets extinguished (attenuated). Feed horn design might be able mitigate some of these losses.

For countering the effect, there are several techniques, either in construction of the reflectors or lenses, or in the way signal beams are concentrated.

Satellite-based dish antennas may be deformed intentionally to selectively distribute radiated power over a desired "footprint", in order to increase received power in the desired reception area (e.g. one selected nation), and reduce power outside of it (e.g. a neighboring nation).

Ground based dish antennas might benefit from minor deformation, producing a footprint encompassing satellite tidal motion.
