= Zeiss formula =

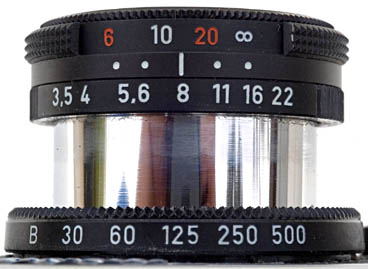
The Carl Zeiss 40mm Triotar lens referred to in Jacobson's lens tutorial. The dots represent DOF limits for f/8 and f/16; the dots indicate that the lens is focused at approximately the hyperfocal distance for f/16, about 13 feet. Jacobson's inferred circle of confusion diameter, using $c = f\,^2 / (N H)$, was about 0.025 mm.

In photographic optics, the Zeiss formula is a supposed formula for computing a circle of confusion (CoC) criterion for depth of field (DoF) calculations. The formula is $c = d/1730$, where $d$ is the diagonal measure of a camera format, film, sensor, or print, and $c$ the maximum acceptable diameter of the circle of confusion.

The Zeiss formula is apocryphal, in the sense that it has grown to be a well-known named concept by propagation through the internet, even though it has no official origin, little connection to Carl Zeiss Company, and no recognition or usage in the photographic industry outside the web community.

The number 1/1730 derives from a circle of confusion diameter of 0.025 mm on a full-frame 35 mm film format, with diagonal size about 43.25 mm (43.25/0.025 is 1730). The CoC size of 0.025 mm for this format appears in Jacobson's Photographic Lenses Tutorial, and the 1730 in his 1996 Photographic Lenses FAQ. Jacobson derived the 0.025 mm CoC number from analysis of the Zeiss Triotar lens DoF markings on the Rollei B35 (see photo). The manual for the Rollei B35 also states 0.025 mm CoC for its tabulated DoF distances, though it also includes an example DoF reading that implies a larger CoC.

By 2001, the term "Zeiss formula" had appeared, in the manual for the on-line DoF calculator f/calc.

On the other hand, Zeiss gives the values d/1000 as the traditional standard and d/1500 as the modern standard.

== See also ==
- Circle of confusion
- Depth of field
- Hyperfocal distance
