= Rollei 35 =

Camera made by Rollei

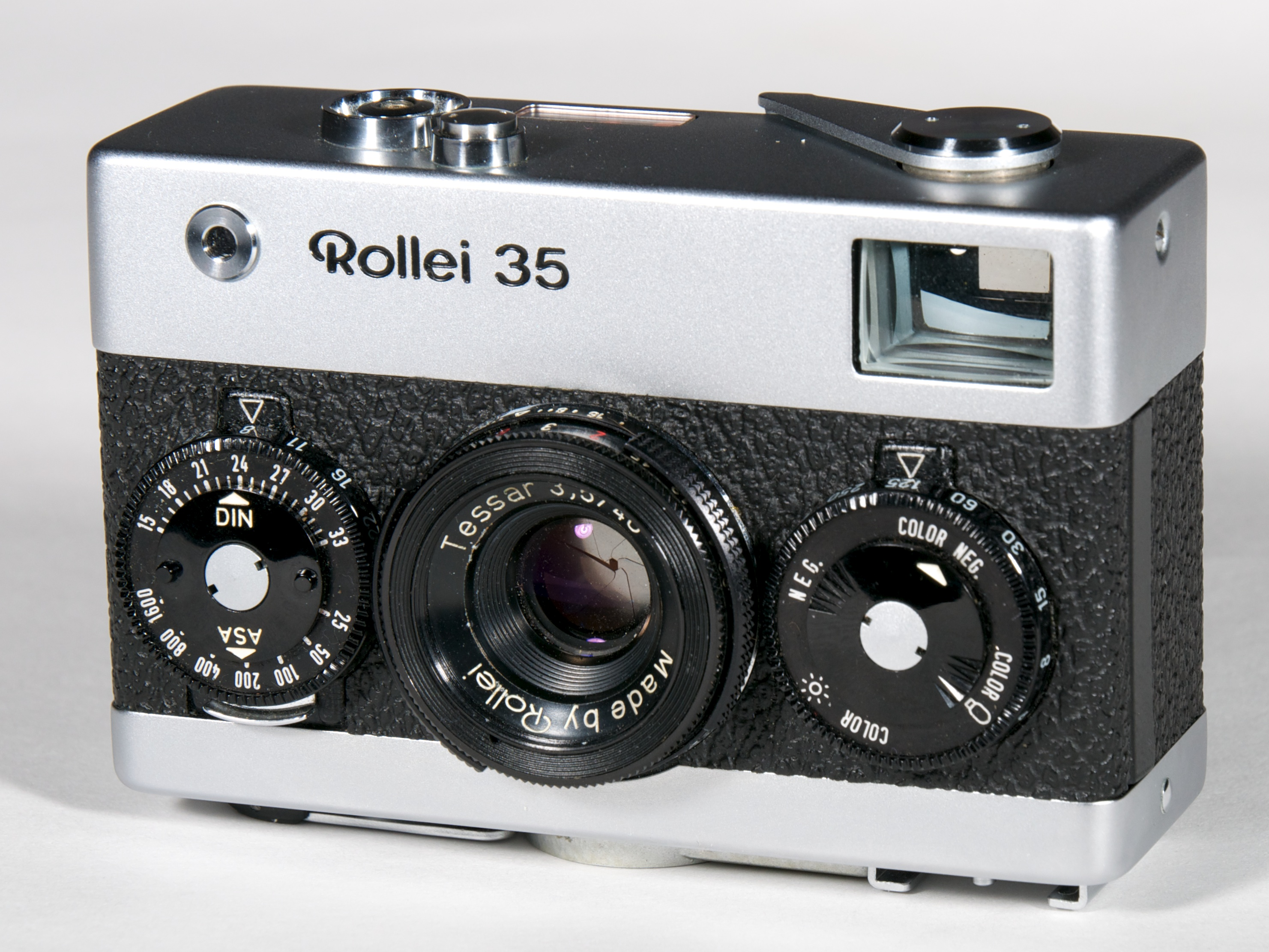
Rollei 35

The Rollei 35 is a 35mm miniature viewfinder camera built by Rollei. The original Rollei 35, when introduced at photokina in 1966, was the smallest existing 135 film camera. The Rollei 35 series remains one of the smallest 35 mm cameras after the Minox 35 and Minolta TC-1. In 30 years, about 2 million Rollei 35 series cameras were manufactured. The Rollei 35 was manufactured by DHW Fototechnik up to 2015, the successor of Franke & Heidecke as small-batch production. The last version was the Rollei 35 Classic, an updated Rollei 35 S.

== Technical development ==
=== Preliminary thoughts ===
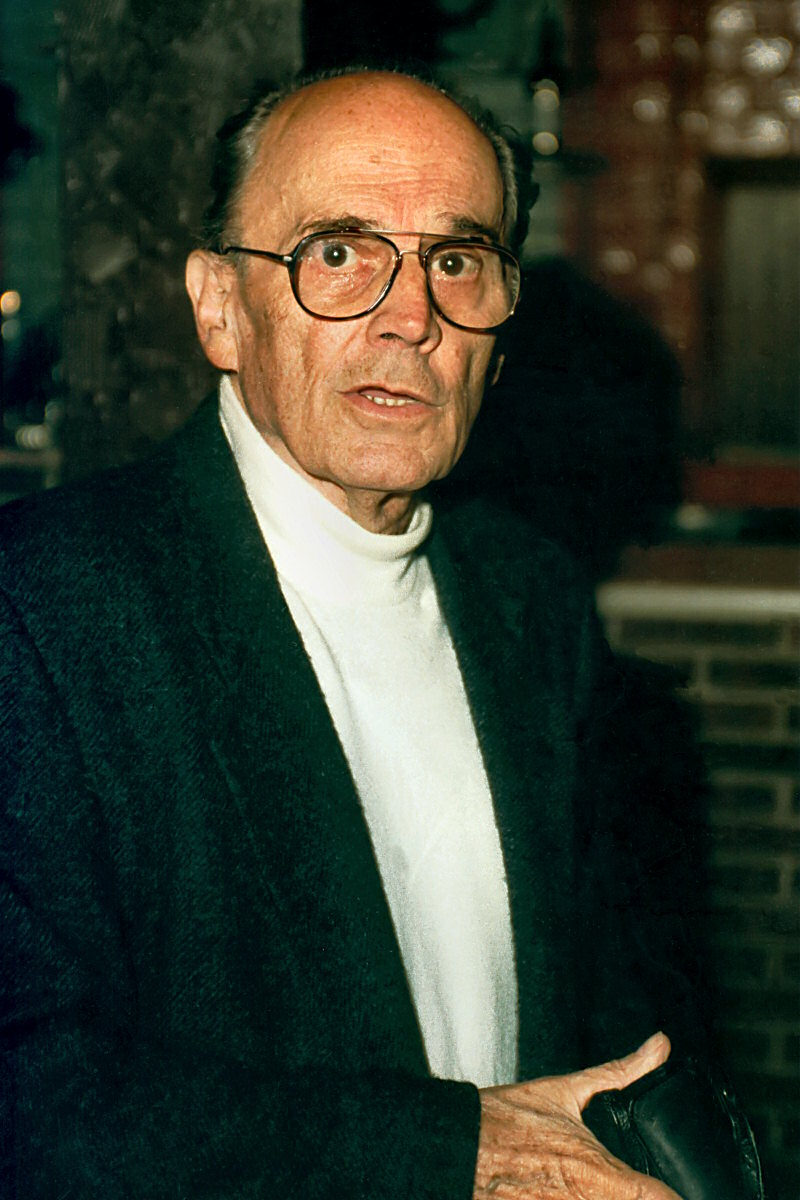
Heinz Waaske created the Rollei 35 camera. This picture was taken in July 1995.

In about 1960, when the first subminiature cameras for 16 mm film came to market, Heinz Waaske, chief engineer of German camera maker Wirgin, proposed that the purchasers of the 16 mm subminiature cameras, or even the half-frame Olympus Pen 35 mm cameras, were motivated not by the tiny film format but the size of the cameras. After having already engineered and designed the 16 mm Wirgin Edixa 16 as well as 35 mm single-lens-reflex cameras, he now set out to build a 35 mm camera in a housing only one third of the volume of the viewfinder cameras of the time.

=== Design of first prototype ===
In his spare time, working in his own living room, Waaske made the first technical drawings of the camera in 1962, with prototypes made by Wirgin.

==== Lens ====
The three-element 40 mm f/3.5 Cassar lens was sourced from Steinheil.

Housed within a sliding tube, the lens retracts into the camera body when not in use.

==== Shutter ====
Because of the limited radius of available space around the fully insertable lens, the use of the normal central shutter was impossible. Therefore, Waaske proposed a new type of shutter, which was separated into two functional parts. The shutter controlling clockworks were mounted unmovable in the camera body, while the shutter lamellas were mounted in the movable sliding tube. The separate parts were mechanically coupled by shafts. Only when the shutter was cocked and therefore the lamellas were uncoupled, could the sliding tube be inserted into the housing.

==== Film compartment ====
Waaske filed patents for the shutter construction as well as the space-saving, film-guiding five sprocket wheel. This design deviated from the normal construction that advanced the film with an eight sprocket wheel.

Another difference to the conventional design was the cocking lever. On the Rollei 35, the lever is located at the top left and the film rewinding crank at the bottom right of the camera body (instead of the cocking lever being at the top right and the rewind crank at the top left). The cartridge sits in the right side of the camera and correspondingly the exposures lay "upside down" on the film, reflected by the inverted position of the film inscriptions (type, frame numbers) of under/over landscape pictures. To change the film, the back must be slid downwards and removed fully, like on the Contax, for example.

==== Light meter ====
For the shutter-coupled exposure meter of the prototype camera, Waaske selected a selenium cell powered meter from Metrawatt. The manually adjusted exposure control remained unchanged in later models of Rollei 35.

=== On the way to mass production ===
When Heinz Waaske finally presented the fully functional new camera prototype to his employer, Heinrich Wirgin (a.k.a. Henry Wirgin) said: "So you have wasted time on your own construction in my prototyping workshop?!". It was not until that moment, that Wirgin told his chief engineer that he had already decided to end camera production and photo equipment business.

Looking for new employment, Waaske presented his compact camera to Ludwig Leitz and to Kodak, but to no avail. In January 1965 Waaske started working for Rollei in Braunschweig (Brunswyck). Having become Rollei's managing director only in March 1965, Heinrich Peesel accidentally got a first glimpse of his new employee's tiny prototype camera. Filled with enthusiasm, Peesel decided that the camera should immediately be further developed by Waaske for mass production, but, using only parts of Rollei's suppliers. Waaske's little camera was presented at photokina in 1966 as Rollei 35, with a better lens – the Zeiss Tessar 40 mm f/3.5 lens, a state-of-the-art Gossen CdS-exposure meter and a precision-made diaphragm shutter made by Compur, using Waaske's patented shutter design.

== The Rollei 35 standard model ==
=== Development ===
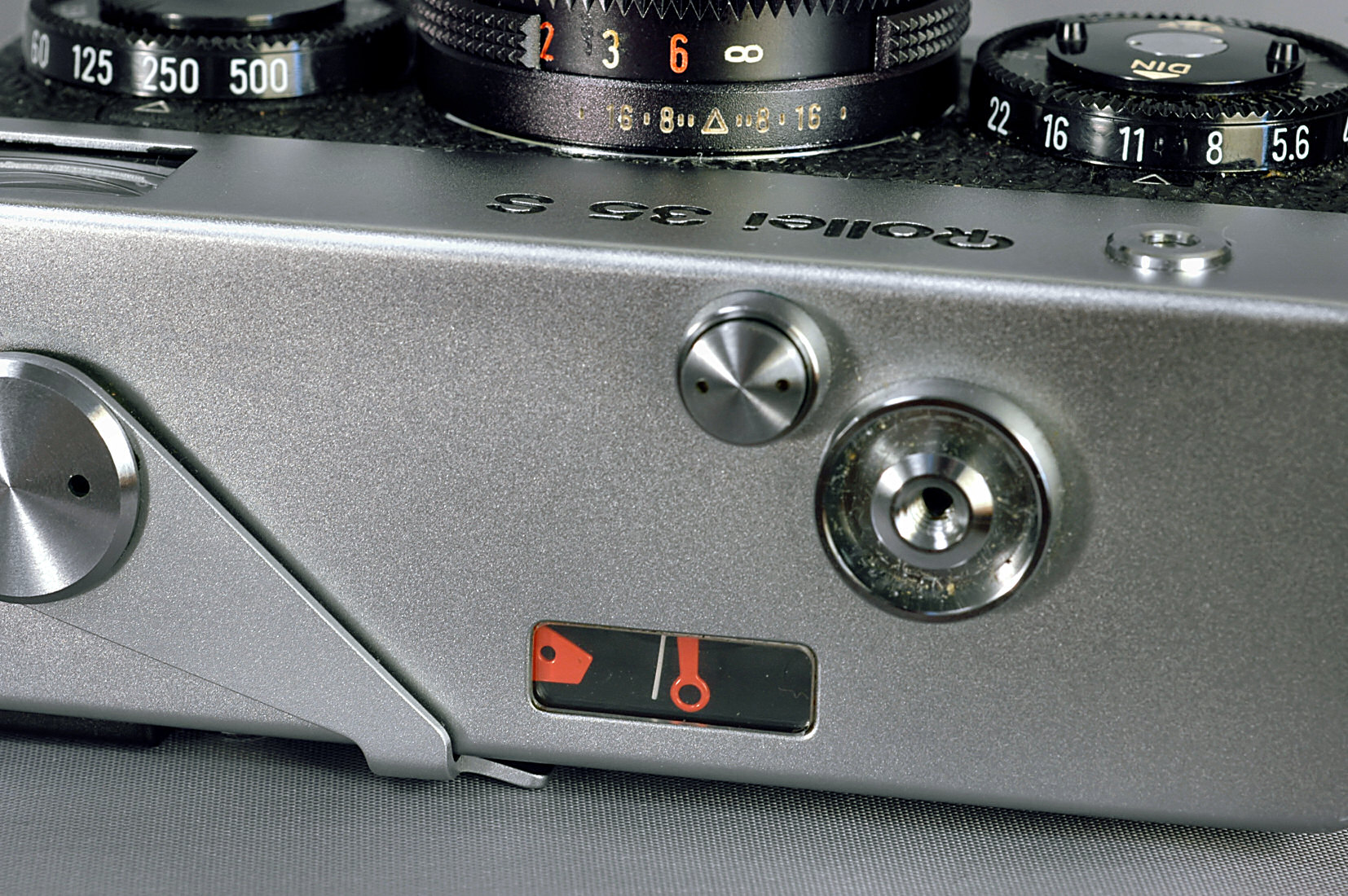
Rollei 35 S – Light meter display

Optical lens type – Zeiss Tessar

The camera had to be converted to use parts from Rollei's suppliers, as Rollei did not maintain business relations with Metrawatt and Steinheil. A high-quality Tessar lens was made by Zeiss. Rollei's light meter supplier was Gossen. Whether to use either a photovoltaic selenium sensor or a CdS photoresistor, was finally decided in August in favour of the CdS. Gossen named the same measuring range for both solutions. A selenium-cell powered light meter was cheaper in production and did not need a battery. However, the much smaller CdS-photoresistor improved the stylish look of the camera, the battery powered light-meter was more shock-resistant, and the "CdS technology" could be used as a selling point in advertising. The housing needed to be changed just slightly, since Waaske unknowingly had adopted the appearance of Rollei's twin-lens reflex cameras, by placing the exposure time and aperture controls to the right and to the left side of the lens. Nevertheless, Rollei's designer Ernst Moeckl revised the housing, and by changing the edge radius made the camera body even smaller.

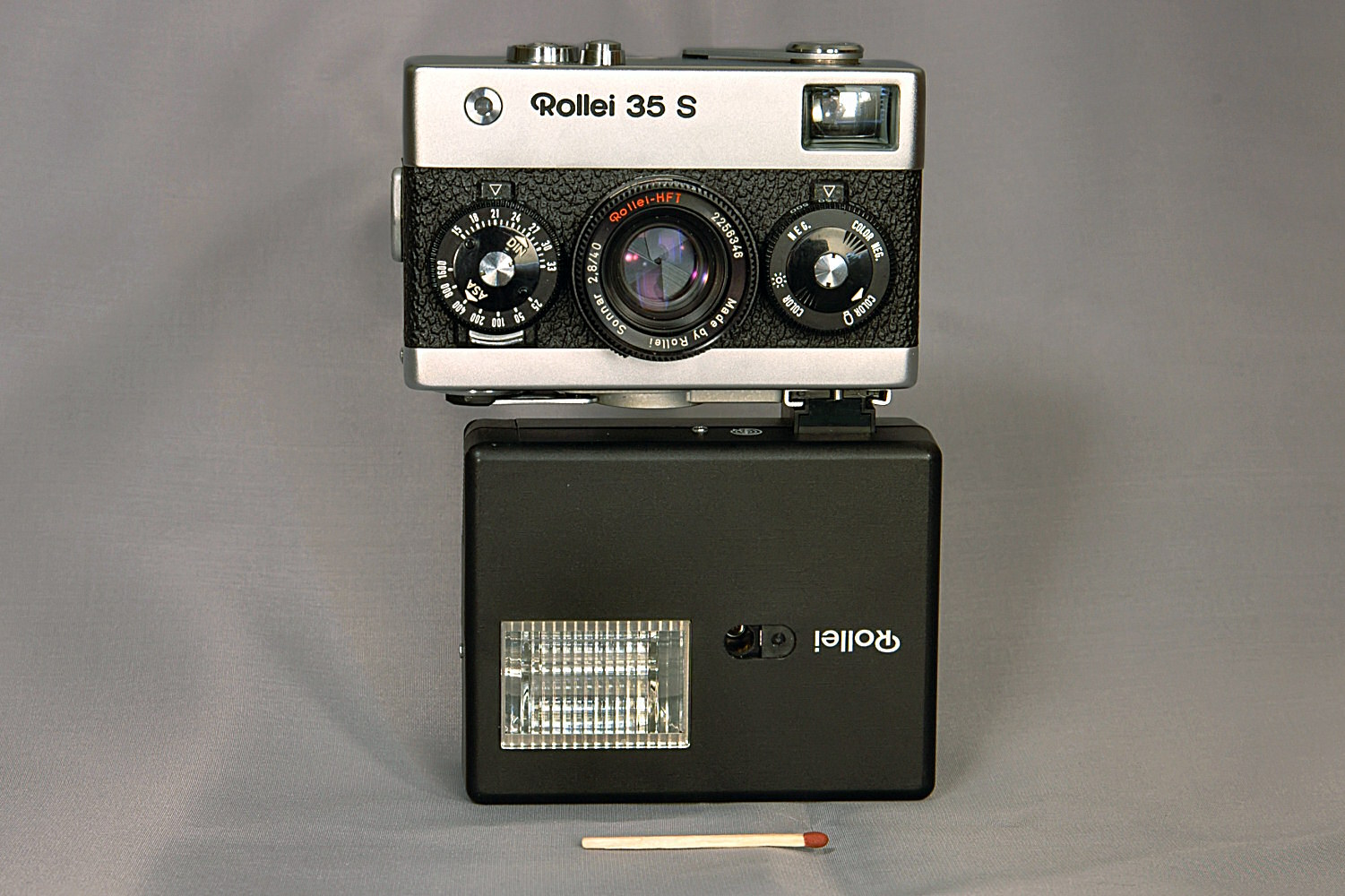
Rollei 35 S with electronic flash Rollei 128BC

For the mercury battery PX 13 (= PX 625 = MR 9) of the light meter, a place was found inside the camera housing. The film rewind knob of the engineering model was exchanged for a rewind crank, and a hot shoe was added for mounting an electronic flash at the base plate. Placing the hot shoe on top of the camera was not feasible because of the underlying exposure meter and transmission gear. Mounting the hot shoe at the frame cover would likely cause damage when using one of the heavy flash lights of that time. Therefore, for a natural lighting shade, the camera had to be turned upside down, when using a flash, to get the light source above the lens. The projected name for the camera was at first to be the Rollei Privat, which even was the engraving on the final draft in March 1966. But in April 1966, when Peesel decided to designate all Rollei cameras according to the applied film format, the designation became Rollei 35.

Mass production started in July 1966. The first ads showed cameras with release bolting devices and battery test keys. The first proved to be redundant, since with the lens inserted the camera could not be released anyway. The latter feature was dropped, for reasons of reliability – electrical contacts could easily fail. The voltage of the mercury battery dropped so rapidly at the end of the battery's life that it would be hard to obtain a wrong exposure. Likewise a switch for the exposure meter was also dropped. The exposure meter was always on, even with the lens inserted. Enclosed in the darkness of the camera bag, practically no current drained from the battery, which therefore remained usable for many years.

=== Focusing ===
Like the majority of 135 cameras in the 1960s, the Rollei 35 is a viewfinder camera - a rangefinder was not included. Around 1970, Rollei experimented with adding an integrated rangefinder, but there was not enough room in the camera. They experimented with an external rangefinder mechanism with a turning prism as used in Zeiss Ikon Super Ikontas, but as the production shifted to Singapore this idea was abandoned.

=== Made in Germany ===
Following the preproduction run of 50 pieces, 200 cameras were made for use as advertising and testing samples. After 900 pieces of the regular models had been built by the end of 1966, in 1967 each month 1000 cameras were produced. Until August 1967 all Rollei 35 cameras got the unusual signature "Made in Germany by Rollei – Compur – Gossen – Zeiss", but from then on it became "Made in Germany by Rollei". Further deviations from the first production year were the plastic take-up reel and film rewind bearing, V-shaped grasp for the bottom lock and anti-twist plate for the film cartridge. In September 1968 a special lens cement prevented the previous UV permeability of the Tessar. A variant with a dark-green leather covering was rejected by the sales department, not wanting additional models just 2 years after the sales start. Another prototype with blank adjusting wheels from anodized aluminum proved too expensive to manufacture, however.

=== Made in Singapore ===
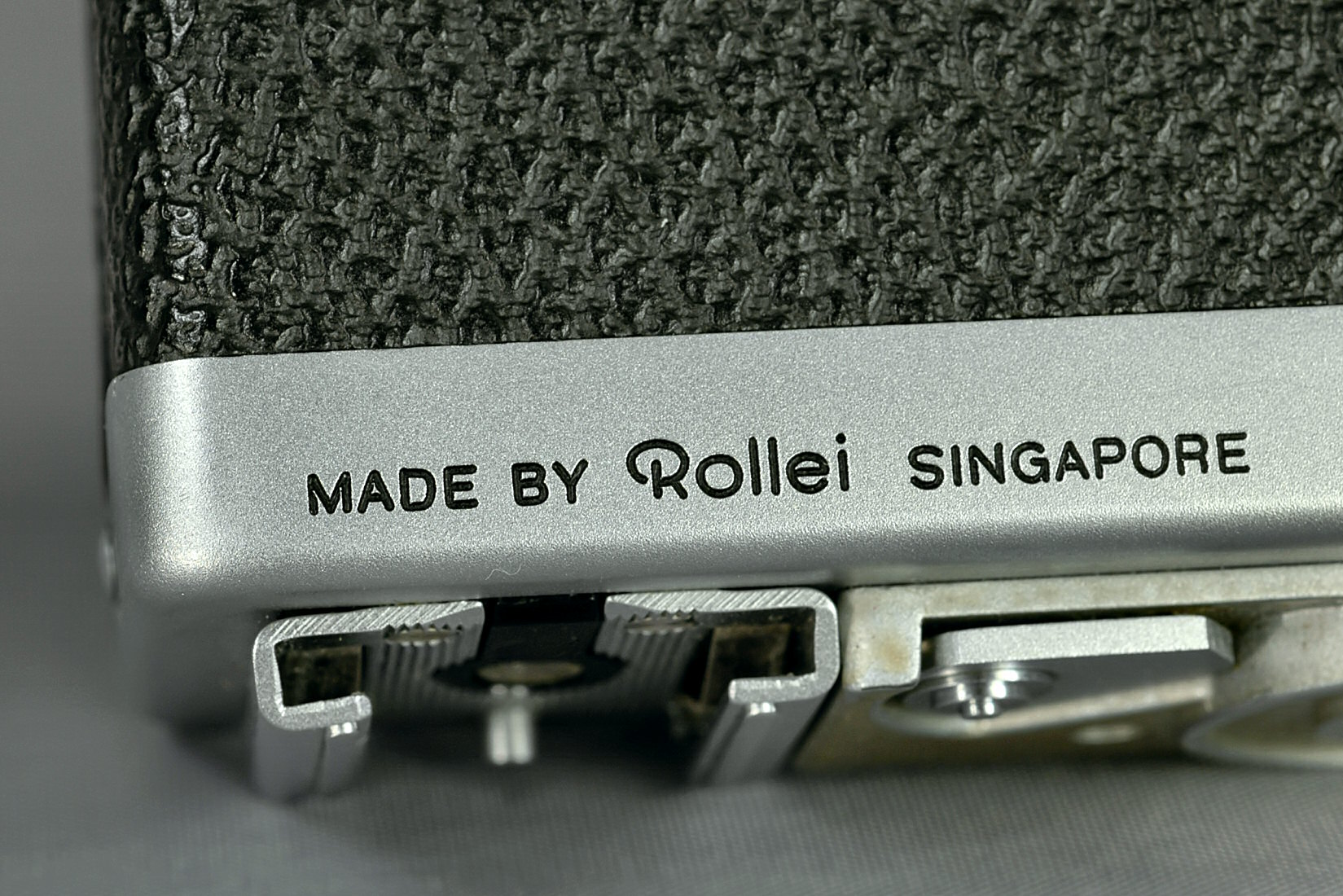
Rollei 35 S – Engraving "Made by Rollei Singapore"

With the establishment of the production plant, preparations began for the immediate shift of the Rollei 35 production to Singapore. Since there were no suppliers in Singapore, all parts had to be manufactured there by Rollei or imported from Japan or Europe. The cameras received the engraving "Made by Rollei Singapore". Now licensed lens production ("Made by Rollei") was used instead of the original Zeiss lenses, as well as Nissei exposure meters and Copal leaf shutters (both Japanese manufacturers). The retail price fell continuously because of low labor costs. This did not continue to be a noticeable advantage however, because of reduction in the cost of competing cameras, but unlike Rollei, through increasing use of electronics. The Rollei operation in Singapore closed down in 1981.

== Entry level models ==
=== Rollei B 35 and C 35 ===
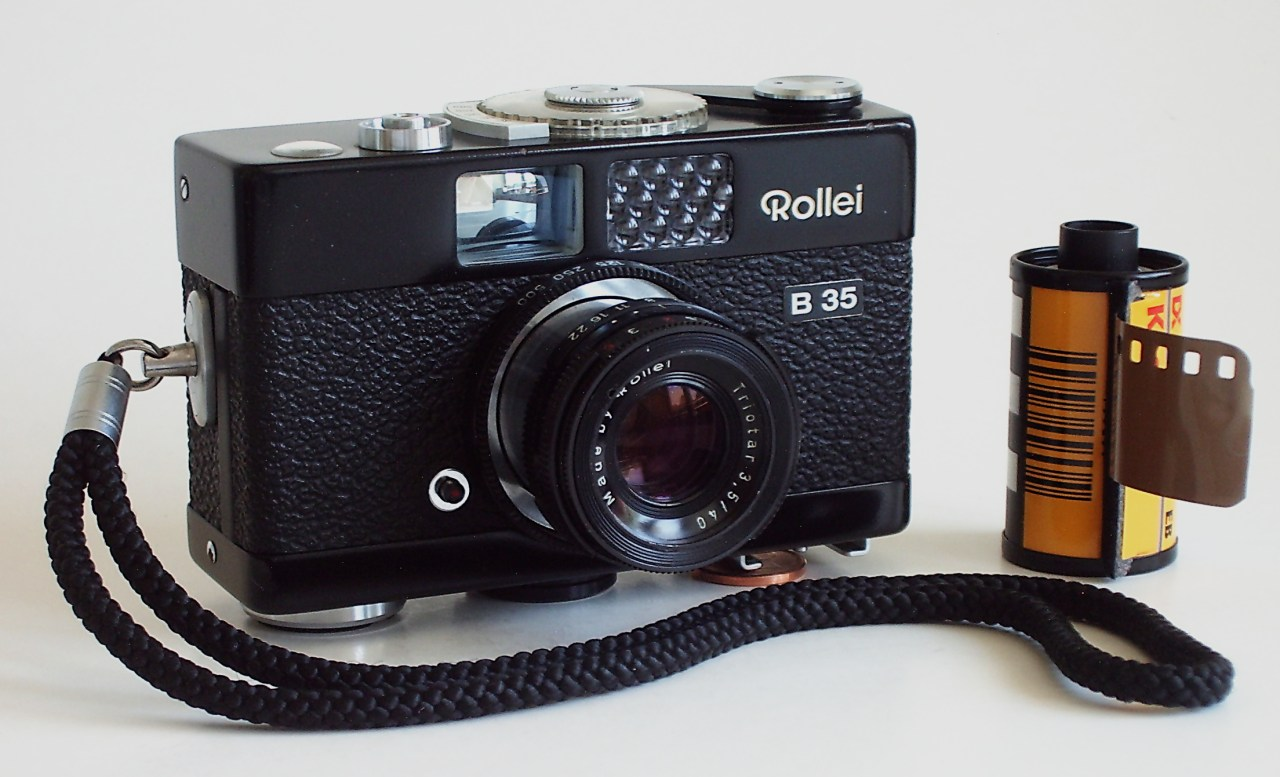
Rollei B 35 in black

A Triplet lens design – like the Zeiss Triotar

Preceded by two concept studies, the entry-level model with a triplet lens, the Zeiss Triotar 40 mm f/3.5, hit the market in October 1969. Initially, for the first concept study, Compur was asked for a simplified shutter with a limited timing range of 1/30 sec to 1/125 sec, which, however, was not cheap enough for an effective reduction in production cost.

Therefore, the first concept study got an immovable lens tube. The original movable sliding tube was one of the most expensive parts, because it had to be precisely manufactured on a lathe for a light tight fitting. The second concept study retained the sliding tube for the lens, but used a selenium light meter. A light meter for the accessory shoe was assigned to be built by Gossen in early 1968, but finally an uncoupled light meter was integrated in the camera housing.

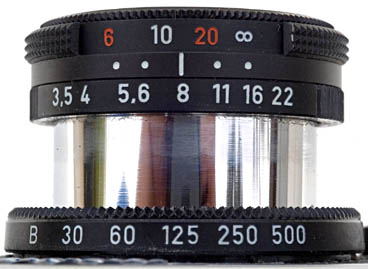
Aperture and shutter control on the lens barrel of a Rollei B 35

The camera received the designation Rollei B 35, with the "B" indicating the light meter (German: Belichtungsmesser), a slightly cheaper model, omitting the light meter, was called Rollei C 35 for compact camera. The innards of the camera were simplified by using more plastic parts. The control wheels on the camera body were replaced by a more conventional aperture control at the lens tube, and the control wheel for exposure time was placed at the sliding tube base on the body. These changes resulted in the fully inserted lens protruded a bit more from the camera body than in the previous model. Both of these models offered a shutter timing range from 1/30 sec to 1/500 sec and an aperture range from f/3.5 to f/22. The focusing range reached from 3 feet (0.9m) to infinity. Two pairs of dots on the lens barrel indicate the depth-of-field for f/8 and f/16. The so-called Zeiss formula was inspired by this camera.

Especially for the North American market, a special edition with an artificial leather covering in traffic-red, yellow-orange, deer-brown, steel-blue and white was produced, counting 100 items for each color; however, as these test samples did not cause much interest, they were not quoted in any price list.

=== Rollei 35 B ===
In 1976 the Rollei B 35 was renamed as Rollei 35 B without any further modification, to better conform to the Rollei designation scheme.

=== Rollei 35 LED ===
Without its own development department, the Singapore production facility asked Rollei Germany for permission to make a redesign of the Rollei 35 B. The uncoupled selenium light meter was replaced by a new electronically coupled light meter, using variable resistors for transferring the aperture and shutter control settings to the light meter. The new designation Rollei 35 LED resulted from the three light emitting diodes in the viewfinder, which indicated overexposure, correct exposure, or underexposure. In October 1977 the first datasheet appeared and in January 1978 preproduction started. But the first models suffered from clumsy design of the power switch, which activated the light meter permanently. If the user forgot to switch the camera off, the battery was drained in just 15 hours. Furthermore, the PX-27 battery could be inserted the wrong way, causing damaged electronics. From August 1978 onward an improved model was made, where the light meter was only activated when the release button was depressed slightly.

== Advanced models ==
=== Rollei 35 S ===
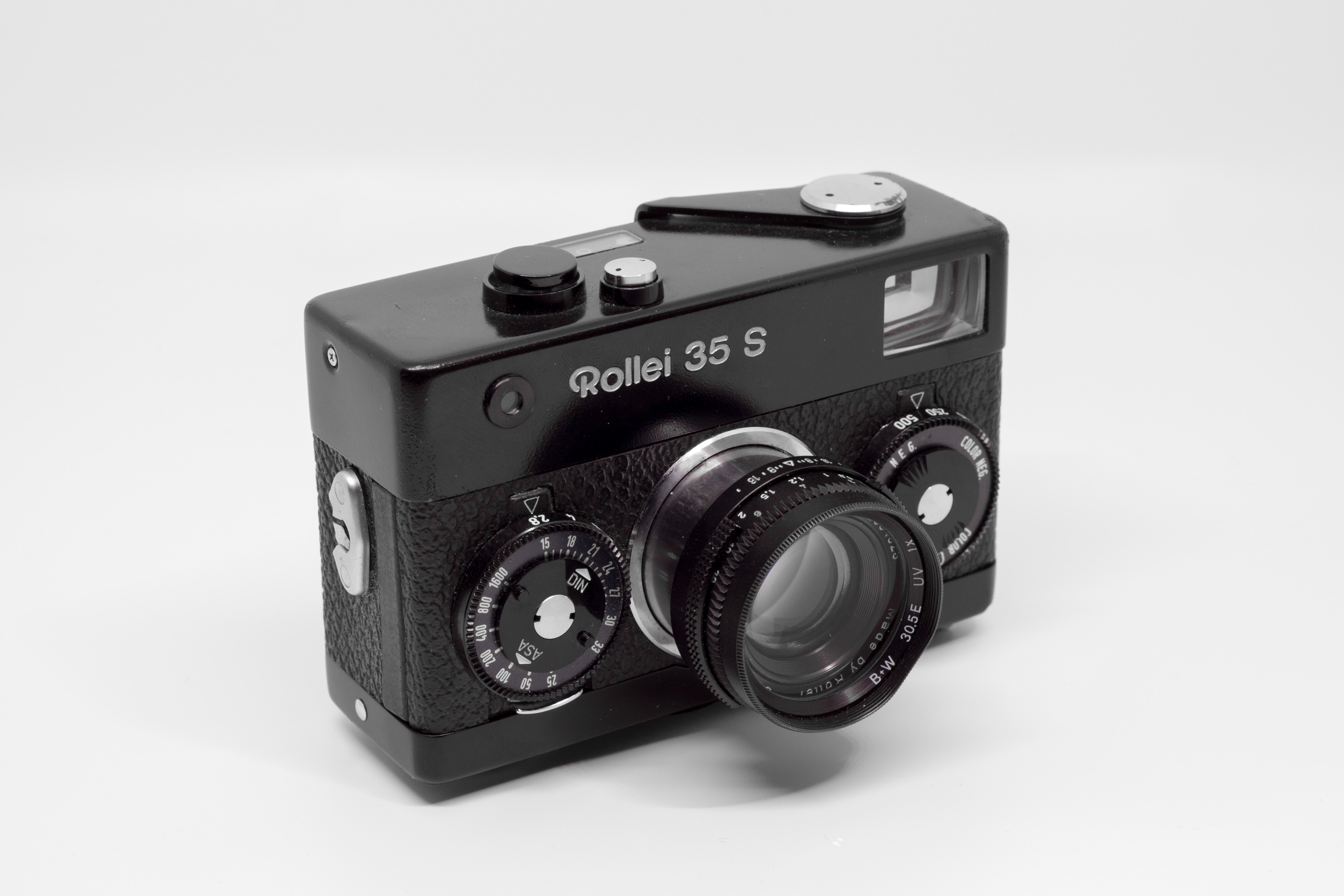
Rollei 35 S (black version)

Due to its large success, as early as the end of 1967 a luxury and a beginners variant of the Rollei 35 were planned. However, because of the production shift to Singapore, it was not until 1971 that the computation of a five-elements lens was assigned to Zeiss. This Sonnar 40 mm f/2.8 lens was to be fitted with a front lens focusing control, like the Tessar, providing a similar mounting in the sliding tube. Only the two front lenses were to move when focusing. But, when finished, the lens did not focus sharply enough at close distances, and mass production had to be delayed by a whole year. The project was stopped and Zeiss designed a new lens with focusing control by moving the whole lens. Rollei's chief of development, Richard Weiß, concluded: "We've got into a precarious loss-making situation because of this. The developers have learned that, in the future, they must examine lenses, even if made by Carl Zeiss, with more skepticism." The tools for producing the new shutter mechanism were built by Prontor, a Zeiss subsidiary company in Calmbach, which had already taken over the manufacturing of the former shutter from Compur (another Zeiss subsidiary).

=== Rollei 35 T ===
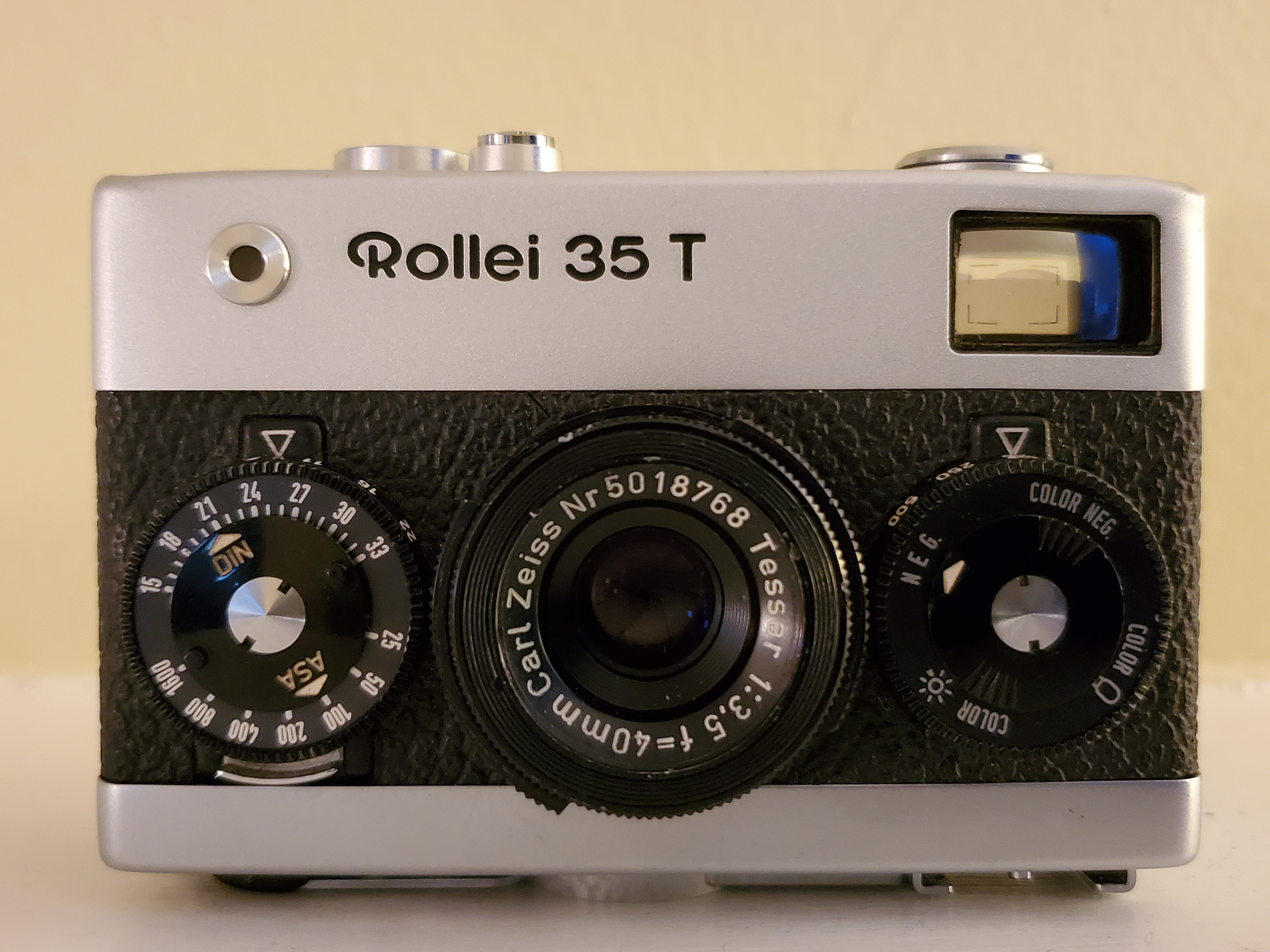
Rollei 35 T with lens recessed

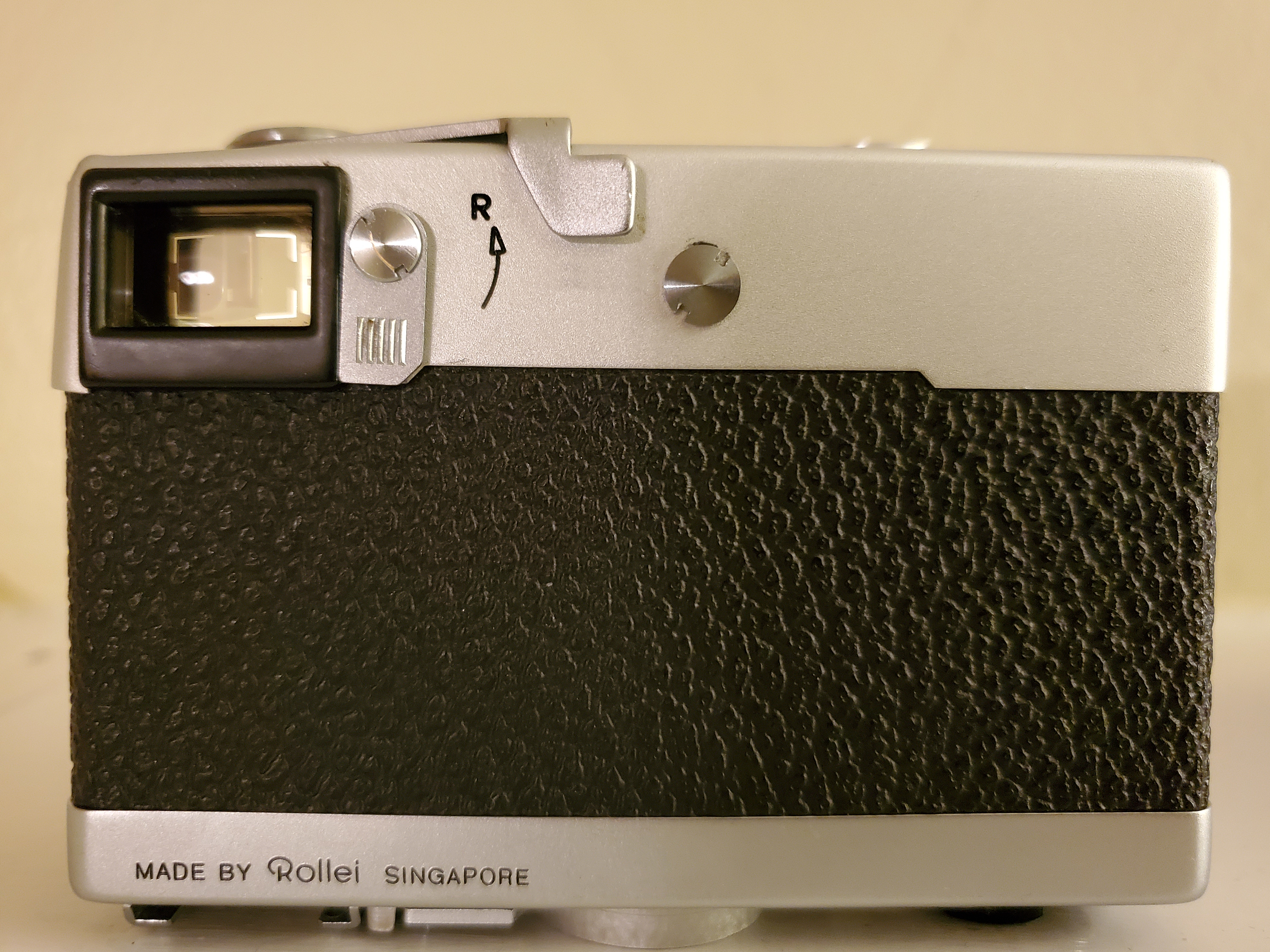
Back of Rollei 35 T, showing Singapore engraving

When introducing the Rollei 35 S the former Rollei 35 was assigned the new name Rollei 35 T, without any further changes. A projected denim covered design variant, with an appropriate denim bag, was rejected because the textile covering frayed.

=== Rollei 35 TE and Rollei 35 SE ===
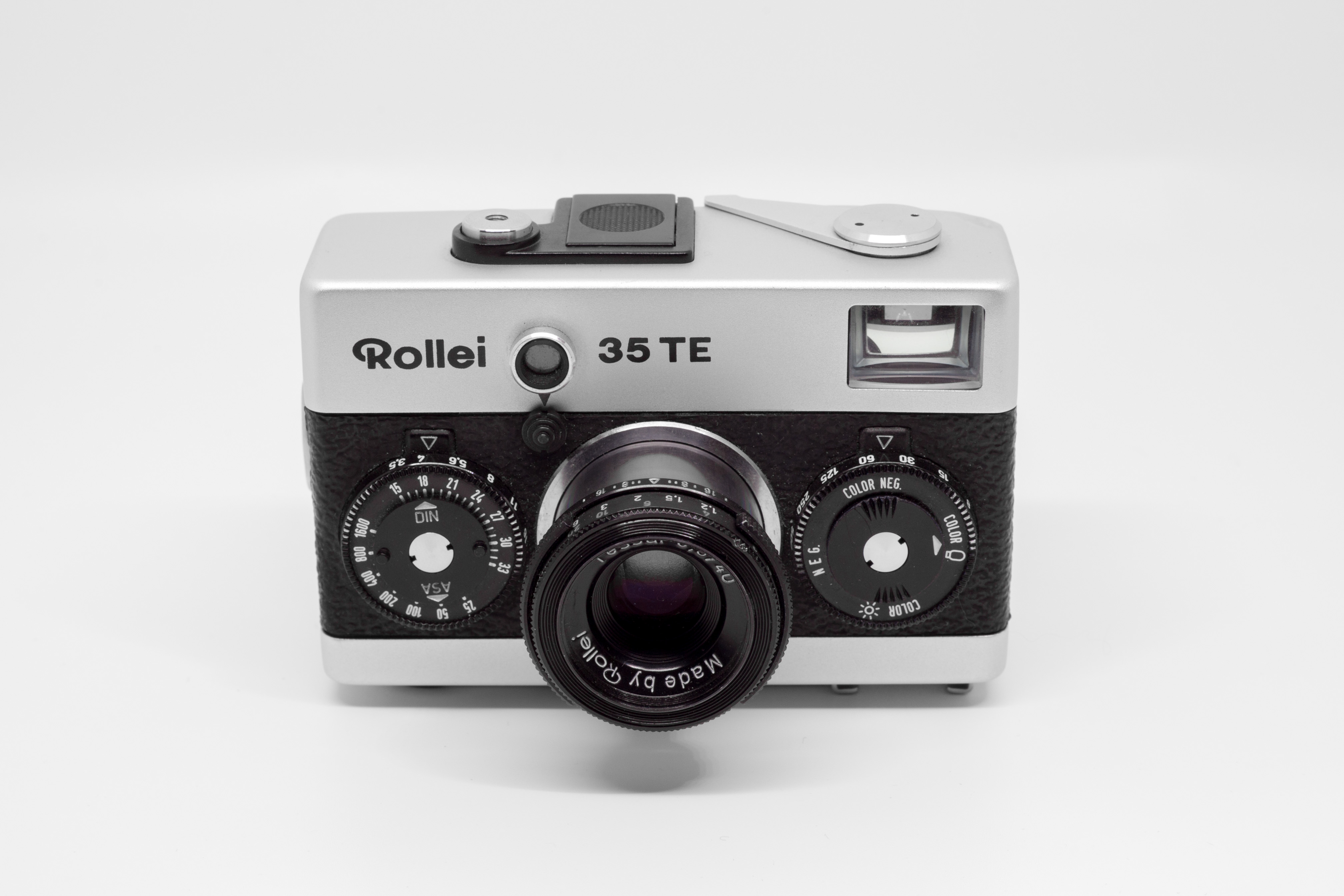
Rollei 35 TE

The original design did not have an exposure control in the viewfinder. The camera had to be taken away from the eye view, to observe the needle on the light meter. (This in fact wasn't a real disadvantage, because to focus the user also had to take the camera to the same position. In normal lighting conditions, the exposure settings of a manual camera really only have to be changed after ten minutes or so, or when changing location. Nevertheless, an exposure control display in the viewfinder was considered very early at Rollei, but an analog display was discarded for limited space reasons, and light emitting diodes were not available at the time.) So not until summer of 1979 were the Rollei 35 TE and Rollei 35 SE released to the market. As the electronic exposure meter needed more power, a larger battery, of type PX-27 with 5.6 volts, was placed where the former instrument movement was mounted, The electronic circuit was built into the former battery compartment. Unlike the Rollei 35 LED the shutter position and aperture control settings were transferred, without any electrical contact wear and tear, using a differential gear turning a variable density filter in front of the CdS light sensor. The release button activated the light meter, when slightly depressed. Three LEDs in the viewfinder indicate the correct exposure. This system worked perfectly, yet earlier models are more in demand today.

== Use of the Rollei 35 today ==
The Rollei 35, Rollei 35 S and Rollei 35 T use a MR-9 mercury-battery with 1.35 volts, which is no longer produced due to environmental considerations. Alternatives are available: a zinc-air cell also provides 1.35 volts, yet with a limited usage time of 1 to 6 months after first activation depending on the design of the cell. Otherwise, the light meter may be adjusted for use with mercury-free silver-oxide batteries. Without adjusting, the higher voltage of 1.55 volts would lead to overexposure by 2 to 3 aperture steps. An adapter to fit the smaller silver-oxide battery to the battery compartment is required. The closest battery in size to the original MR-9 would be SR-44. Alkaline batteries such as the LR-9 a.k.a. PX 625U can not be used, since alkaline cells do not provide constant voltage and will lead to underexposure after becoming half-depleted. Another option is the adaption of the camera for 1,5 V batteries by a Rollei workshop.

As of November 2023, Mint Camera is working on an improved version of the Rollei 35 with additional features such as autofocus and built-in flash.

== Technical data ==
=== Standard models ===
==== Rollei 35 – Original model ====
- Made from 1966 until August 1974
- Lens: Tessar f/3.5, 40 mm, but many items from July 1972 to April 1973 with S-Xenar (made by Schneider)
- Light meter: Battery powered, using CdS photoresistor
- Initial retail price: chrome 487 DM, black 537 DM
- Retail price of items made in Singapore: chrome 460 DM, black 520 DM
- Number of items made in Germany: 312,000
- Number of items made in Singapore: 185,000 plus 30,000 with S-Xenar

==== Rollei 35 S ====
- Lens: Sonnar f/2.8, 40 mm
- Light meter: Battery powered, using CdS photoresistor
- Retail price 1976: chrome 470 DM, black 496 DM
- Number of items: 260,000

==== Rollei 35 T ====
- Produced from September 1974 until February 1980
- In fact the same as the original 35, but renamed for better distinction from the 35 S
- Lens: Tessar f/3.5, 40 mm
- Number of items: 440,000

==== Rollei 35 TE / SE ====
- Made from November 1979 until September 1981
- Newer model with Tessar (TE) respectively Sonnar (SE) lens
- Light meter with LED indicator in viewfinder.
- Different battery: PX27, battery exchangeable without opening the film compartment.
- Initial retail price: 298 DM / 398 DM
- Retail price at mid of 1982: 248 DM / 298 DM (sell out)
- Retail price at end of 1983: 198 DM (sell out)
- Number of items: 120,000 (TE) / 150,000 (SE)

=== Entry level models ===
==== Rollei B 35 / 35 B ====
- Made from October 1969 until early 1978
- Lens: Triotar f/3.5, 40 mm
- Light meter using selenium cell, no battery.
- Initial retail price: 255.30 DM
- Number of items made in Germany: 78,000 (all in chrome)
- Number of items made in Singapore: 95,000 (chrome), 118,000 (black)

==== Rollei C 35 ====
- Made from October 1969 until early 1971
- Lens: Triotar f/3.5, 40 mm
- Light meter: none
- Retail price: 222.90 DM
- Number of items: 9,200 (all made in Germany)

==== Rollei 35 LED ====
- Made from January 1978 until the end of 1980
- Lens: Triotar f/3.5, 40 mm
- Light meter with LED indicator in viewfinder.
- Different battery: PX27, battery exchangeable without opening the film compartment.
- Initial retail price: 229 DM
- Number of items: 157,500

== See also ==
- Rollei 35 RF

== Literature ==
- Kameras für Millionen, Heinz Waaske: Konstrukteur by Jorgen Eikmann, Ulrich Voigt; Wittig Fachbuch 1997 ISBN 3-930359-56-1
- Rollei 35 – Eine Kamerageschichte by Claus Prochnow; Appelhans Verlag, ISBN 3-930292-10-6
- Rollei Report 3 by Claus Prochnow; Lindemanns Verlag, ISBN 3-89506-141-7

(Claus Prochnow was a former Rollei employee)
