= Phase center =

Apparent center of radio emission from an antenna

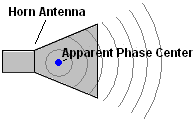
In horn and other directional antennas, the apparent phase center is used since radiation is only emitted at certain angles.

In antenna design theory, the phase center is the point from which the electromagnetic radiation spreads spherically outward, with the phase of the signal being equal at any point on the sphere. Apparent phase center is used to describe the phase center in a limited section of the radiation pattern.

If it is used in the context of an antenna array, one has to define a reference point from which the basevectors of the single elements are referred to. The phase center may vary, depended on the beamforming algorithm. It produces the weight vector, that may vary over time depending on the geometrical setup as well as the receive conditions.

Knowledge of the antenna phase centre is of particular importance if time-delay measurements are carried out by means of signals received via an antenna. This is the case for example for Global Positioning System and Very-long-baseline interferometry.

Variation of the phase center of a GPS antenna
