= Heinz Waaske =

German camera designer

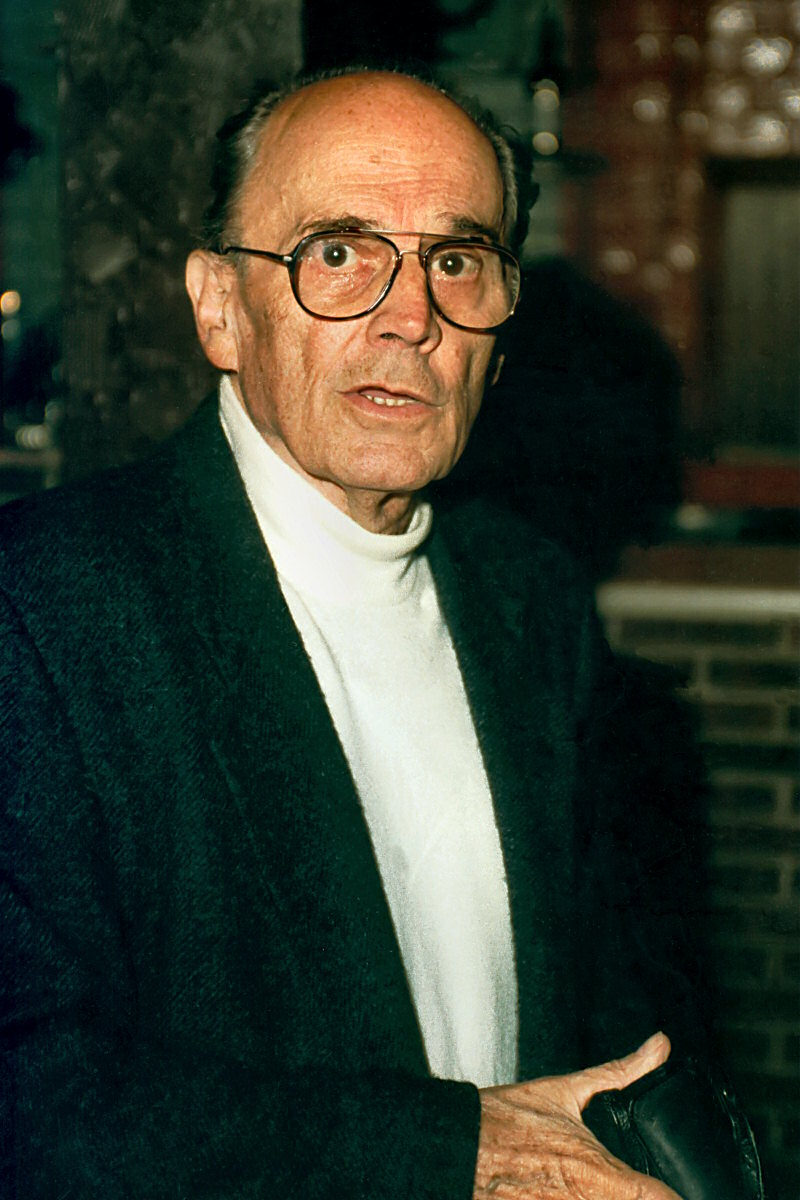
- Heinz Waaske on 10 June 1995
- Born: 1924; Berlin
- Died: 1995 (aged 70–71); Braunschweig
- Occupation: Engineer
- Employer(s): Wirgin and Rollei
- Known for: Inventor of the Rollei 35 and other devices.
- Spouse: Anita Waaske

Heinz Waaske (1924–1995) was a German camera designer, notably father of the Rollei 35.

== Early career ==
Born in Berlin, Heinz Waaske started his career as a precision mechanic apprentice at Telefunken in Sickingenstraße in Berlin, where he studied from 1939 to 1942. After serving in the German army during World War II, being severely wounded and taken prisoner, he joined Krenzin in Berlin-Kreuzberg. There he encountered camera technology for the first time, and developed a great taste for it. For financial reasons, he could not study engineering. He started designing a 16mm miniature camera in his spare time, and sold the prototype in 1948 for 3.000 Marks.

== Work with Wirgin ==
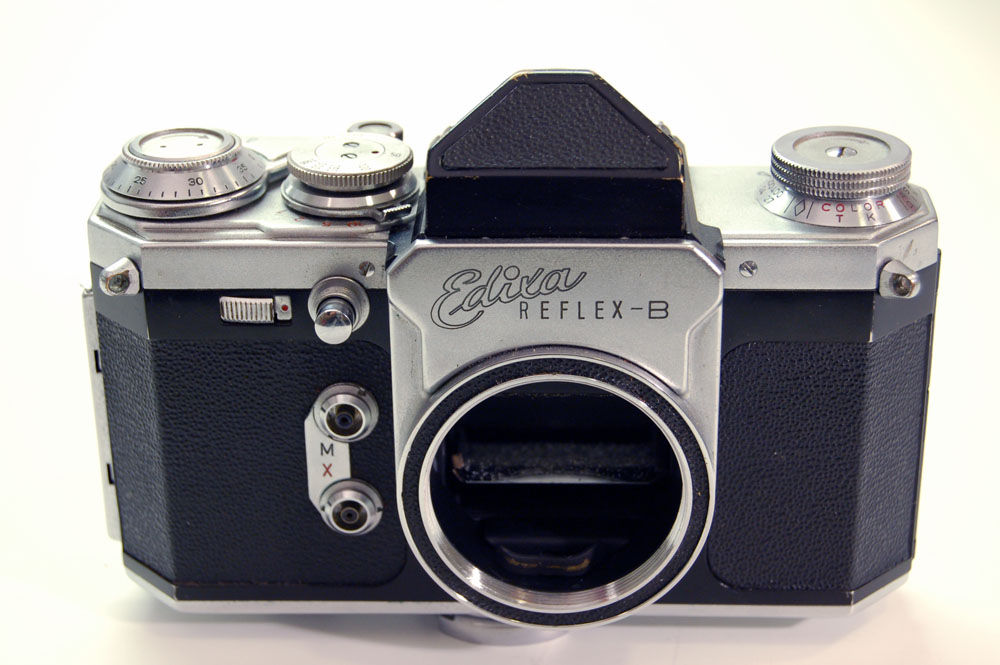
Edixa Reflex-B

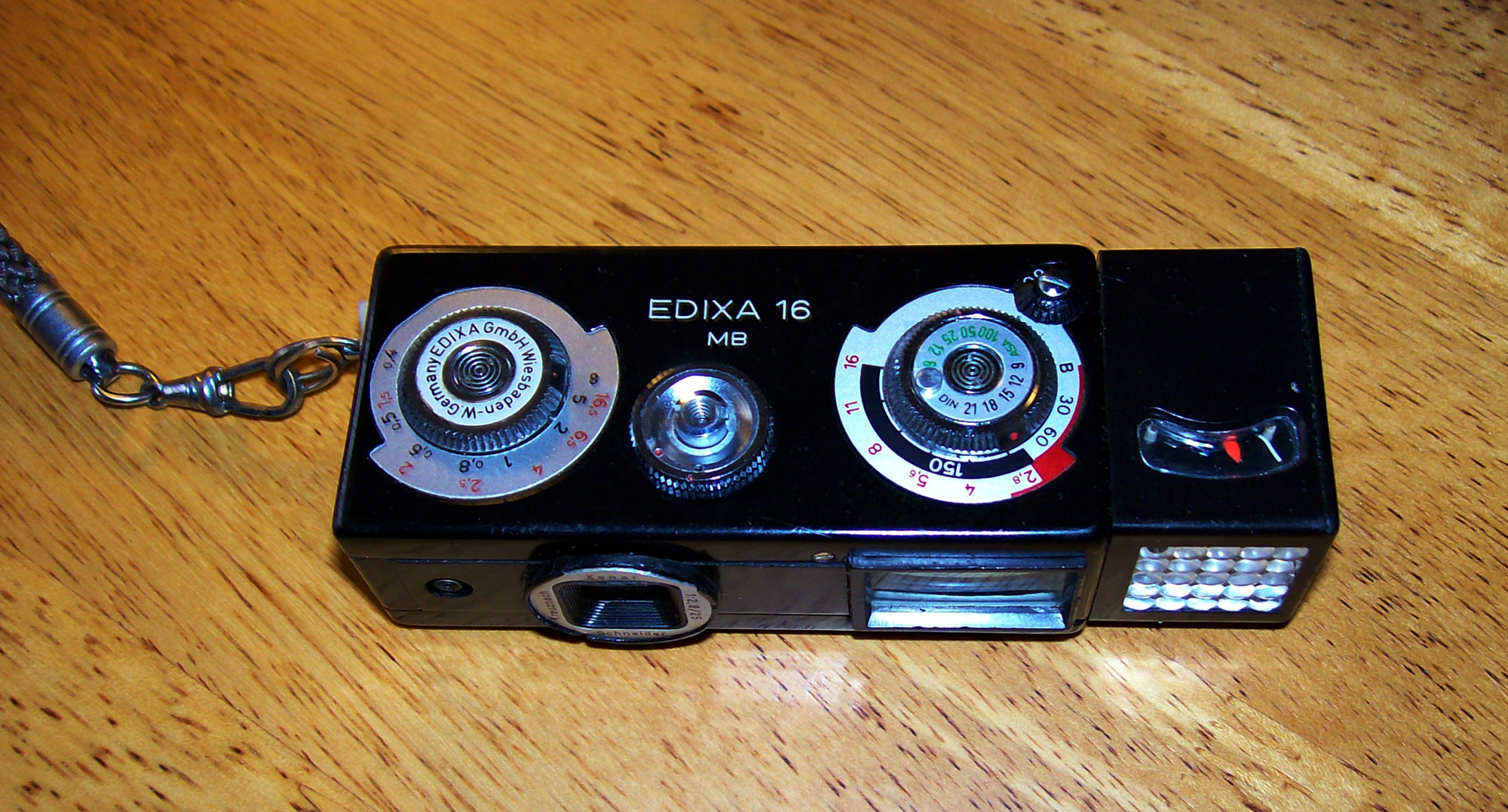
Wirgin Wiesbaden 16mm kleinstbild Kamera Edixa 16MB

From 1948, Waaske transferred to the Wirgin brothers company in Wiesbaden. He worked as a precision mechanic and soon rose to head of the prototype workshop, to technical designer, and eventually to chief designer. He first improved the medium format 6x9 cameras, allowing cheaper manufacturing procedures.

By then a chief designer, he decided to design a mirror reflex camera, which materialised as the Edixa miniature reflex. Wirgin joined the club of the renowned mirror reflex manufacturers. Waaske further designed all the successors to the Edixa, including the Edixamat reflex and the Edixa Electronica.

When he designed the Edixa 16, Waaske had to design the shutter himself, as suppliers could not provide sufficiently small mechanisms. The Edixa 16 was a camera using the 16 mm film cartridges by Rollei, a cheaper alternative to the expensive Rollei cameras.

Waaske had understood that there was a market for small cameras which would use 135 film rather than the ultra-miniature formats. He made the design in his living room and had Wirgin Musterbau manufacture the parts for the prototype. When Waaske showed the prototype to Wirgin Musterbau, he was told "So, you've wasted my time and my equipment for your own projects?" Wirgin then left the camera business and the company closed.

At the time, the only other camera manufacturers were Leitz and Kodak, who had no interest in hiring Waaske.

== Career with Rollei ==
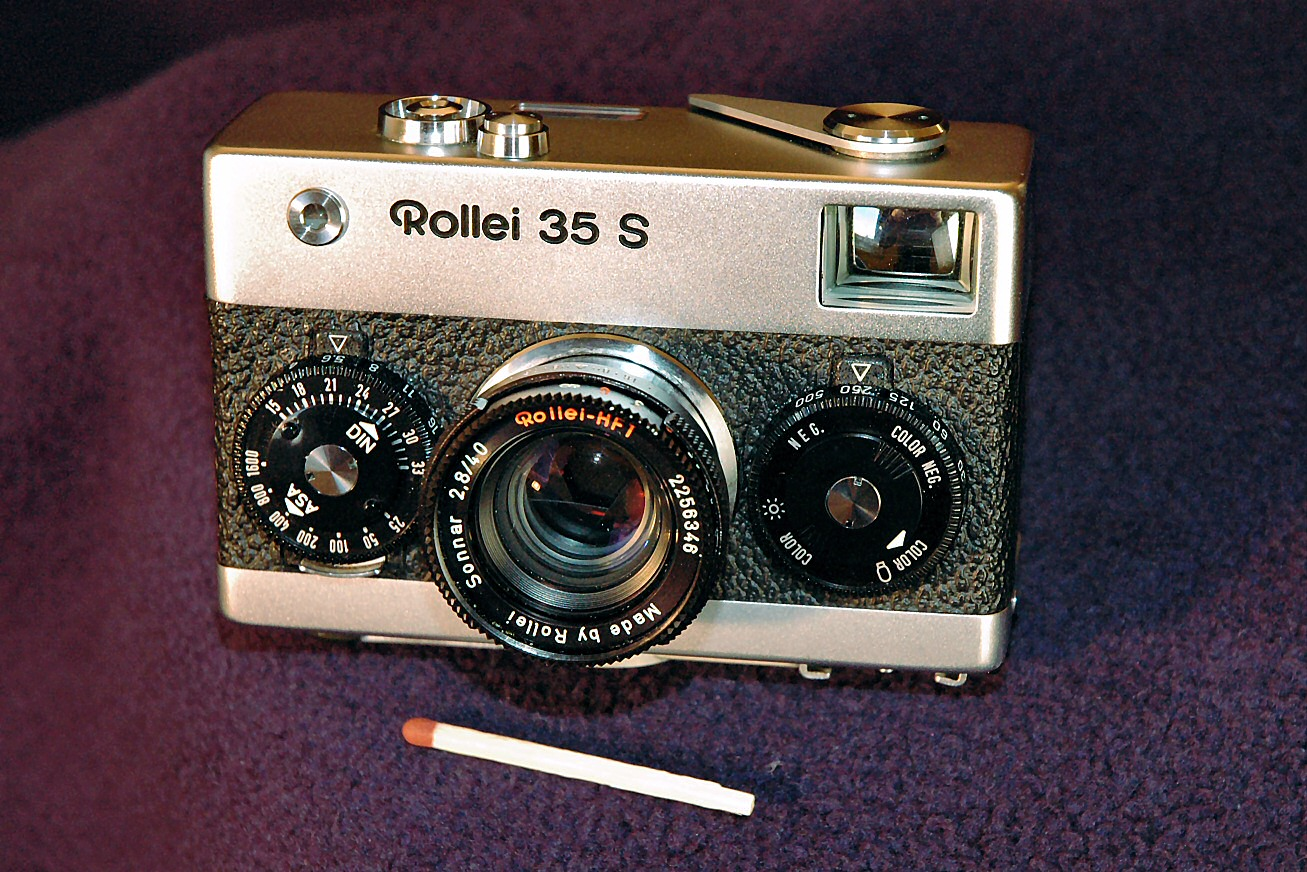
Rollei 35S

Waaske joined Rollei in January 1965, and at first did not mention his attempts for a compact 135 camera. The chief of development, Richard Weiß, had him work on the Rolleiflex SL 26.

When Waaske showed his pocket camera prototype to Heinrich Peesel, the head of Rollei, he was so enthusiastic about it that he decided the camera should immediately be developed further by Waaske for mass production, but using parts only from Rollei's suppliers.

The Rollei 35 was introduced at photokina 1966 and became instantly an international success.

Later, Waaske introduced improvements in the loading system of small format reflex cameras which were mass-produced with the Rollei Rolleiflex SL2000F.

Waaske's last contribution to Rollei was the Rolleimatic, which was designed to be as easy to use as the Instamatic camera, but use the 135 format, allowing for a better image quality. Waaske resigned his position at Rollei in 1978, before the introduction of the Rolleimatic on the market, in 1980.

== Career as independent engineer ==
From 1978, Waaske had his own technical design office in Braunschweig, working not only on cameras but also, for instance, on loudspeaker systems which went into production with Blaupunkt. His work was characterised by a "technical minimalism", with small and scarce pieces providing as many functions as possible.

Waaske was very inclined towards practical usefulness, and he was very critical of the collection edition of the Rollei 35, with casing made of precious metal. His aim was at providing compact and functional to everybody. He also tartly rejected requests for designing military equipment, arguing that after his experience of the Second World War, he had had enough with war.

He died in 1995 in Braunschweig, and a street of the city was named Heinz Waaske Weg in his honour.

== Works ==
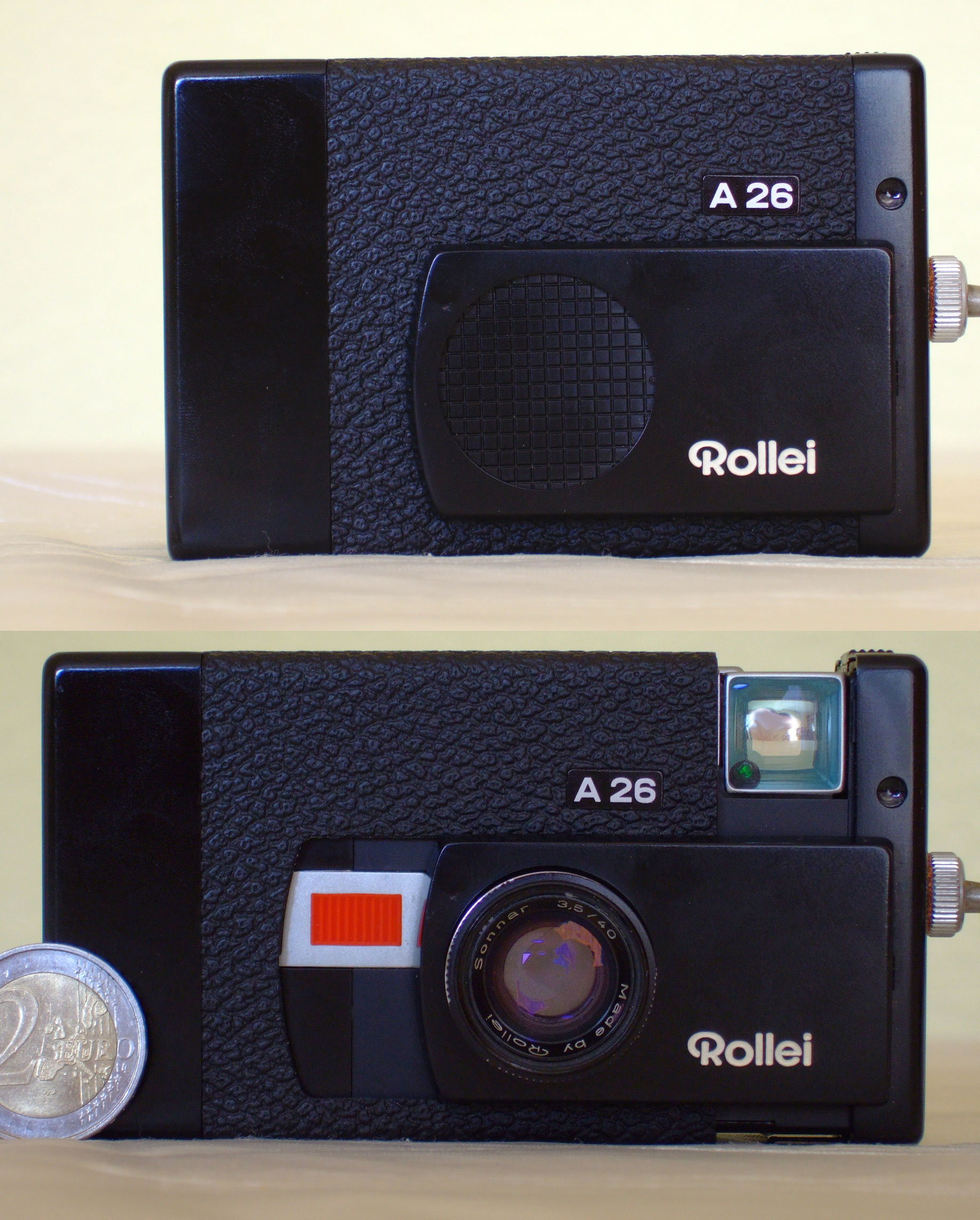
Rollei A26, for Instamatic format

=== For Wirgin ===
- Small format cameras:
  - Edixa Reflex (also known as "Komet")
  - Edixa Electronica leaf shutter automatic SLR
  - Edixa Stereo
- 16 mm subminiature cameras:
  - Edixa 16, Edixa 16M, Edixa 16MB (black model) with a Schneider Kreuznach Xenar 25mm/2.8 lens
  - Franka 16 with Rodenstock Trinar 25mm/2.8 lens
  - Alka 16 with Isco Travegar 2,8/25mm lens

=== For Rollei ===
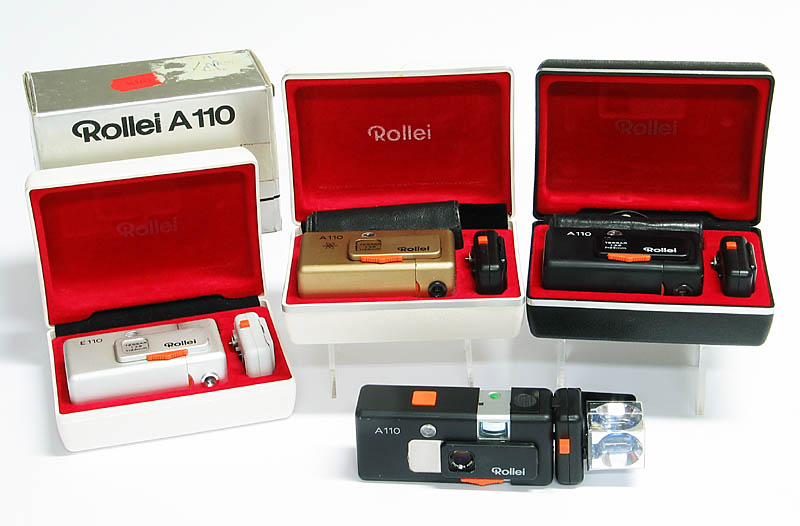
Rollei A110 camera

- Small format:
  - Rollei 35 with Carl Zeiss Tessar 40mm/3.5 lens and Compur shutter (1/2, 1/4, 1/8, 1/15, 1/30, 1/60, 1/125, 1/250, 1/500)
  - Rollei 35S with Carl Zeiss Sonnar 40mm/2.8 lens.
  - Rolleimatic

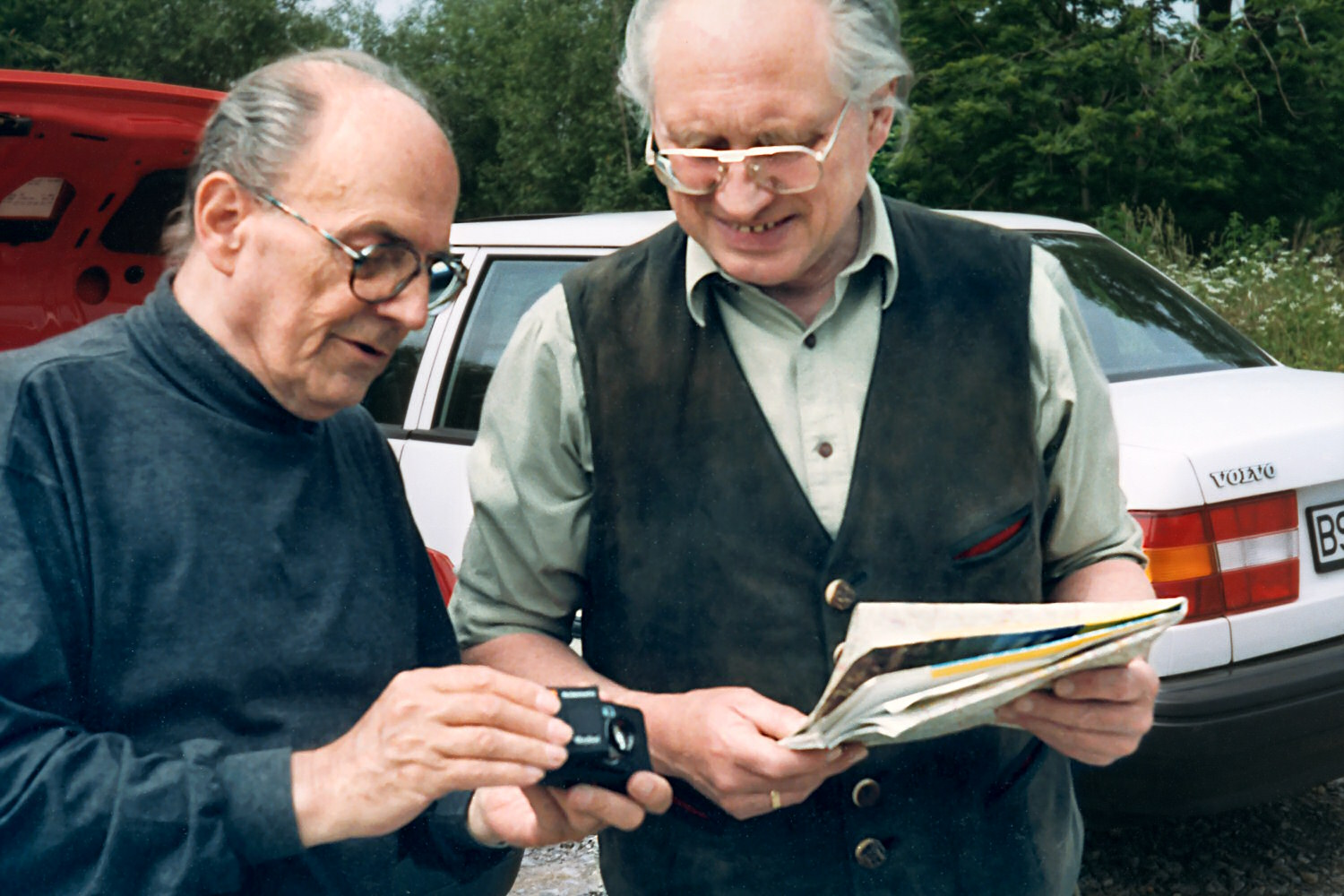
Heinz Waaske (left) explaining the Rolleimatic

Rolleimatic

- 110 "Pocket" Film
  - Rollei E110 Carl Zeiss Tessar 25mm/2.8 lens
  - Rollei A110 Carl Zeiss Tessar 25mm/2.8 lens
- "Instamatic" Film
  - Rollei A26, Carl Zeiss Sonnar 40/3.5 lens

=== As independent designer ===
- 1978 medium format (4,5 x 6 cm) for Minox
- 1981
  - Small format SLR with loading magazine
  - Ultracompact Rangefinder camera with interchangeable lens for Minox
  - Cassette film system for Zeiss microscope systems
- 1984 misc work for Blaupunkt
- 1987 Robot space exploration camera
- 1990 automatic cameras for space safety
