= Franka (disambiguation) =

Franka is a Dutch comic book series and strip cartoon.

Franka may also refer to:

- Franka Batelić, Croatian female singer
- Franka Dietzsch, German athlete
- Franka Kamerawerk, German camera manufacturer
- Franka Potente, German actress and singer
- Joan Franka, Dutch female singer
