= Wirgin =

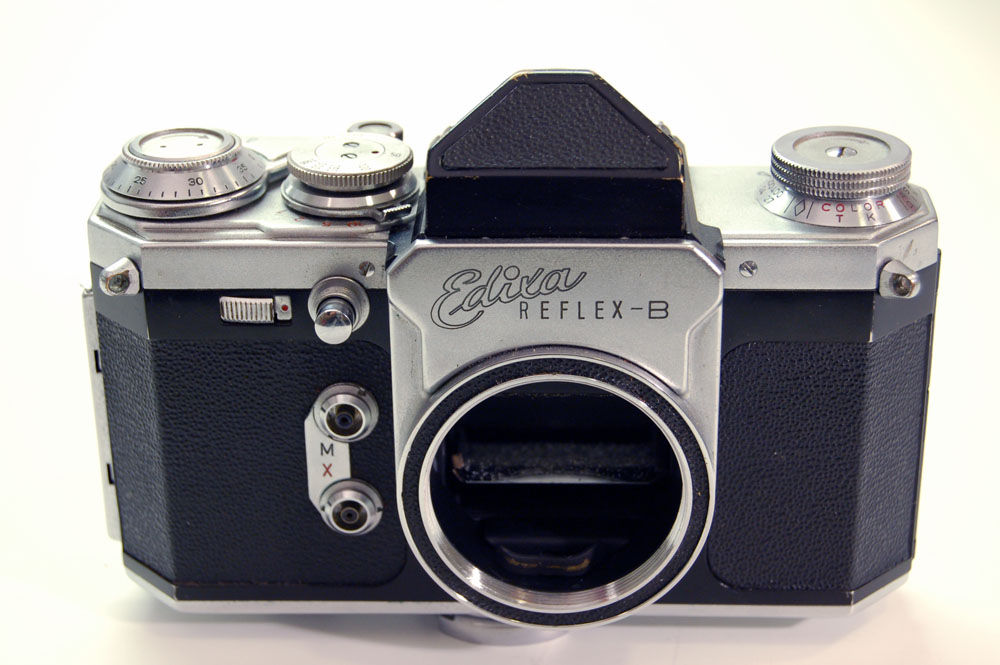
Edixa Reflex-B

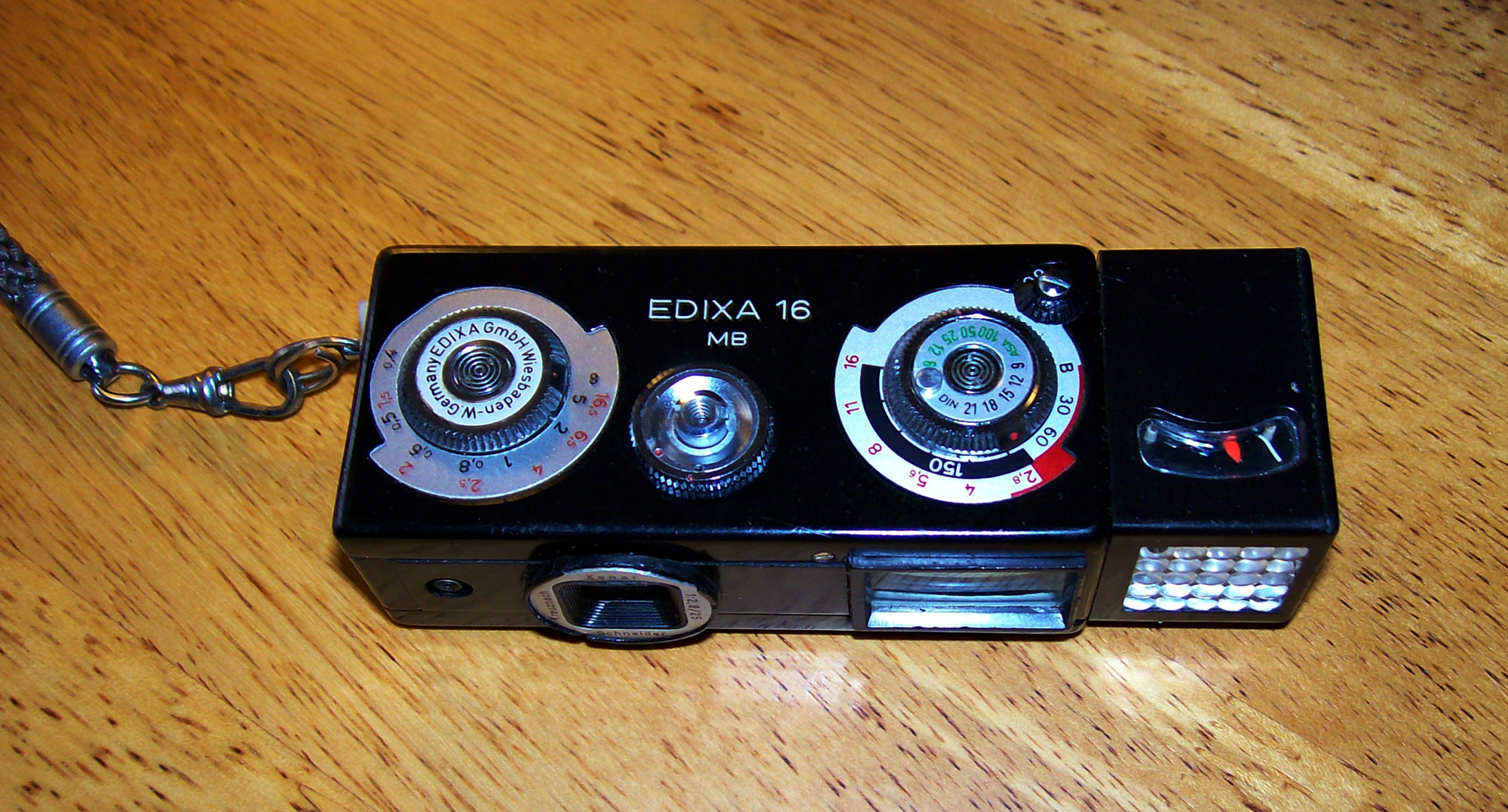
Edixa 16MB, black Edixa 16mm camera with selenium exposure meter

Wirgin was a German company which is still known for its brands Wirgin and Edixa, and for its camera types like the Edina, the Edinex or the Gewirette. It was based in the Hessian capital Wiesbaden and made a line of quite inexpensive 35mm SLRs from the 1950s to the 1970s, including the Edixa Reflex and Edixa-Mat Reflex. Wirgin was West Germany's main producer of SLRs with focal plane shutter. It also produced some of the lenses for its cameras, among them several M42 screw mount lenses.

Wirgin was founded by the brothers Heinrich, Max and Josef Wirgin in 1920. They introduced their first distinctive camera in 1927, the Edinex, which they produced also as Adrette for Adox. In 1934 the company surprised the market with a very small viewfinder camera for type 127 film, the Gewirette. From the mid-1930s it also made Edinex 35mm viewfinder cameras. These came equipped with Wirgin Gewironar lens and Compur shutter or Steinheil Culminar lens (alike Tessar) with Prontor shutter.

In 1938 Heinrich and Josef Wirgin were still in charge of their company in Wiesbaden. However, the Nazi persecution of the Jews compelled them to escape from Germany, with the help of one of their clerks. Max arrived in the US May 14, 1936, Max helped his brothers follow him to America. The Wirgin factory in Wiesbaden became incorporated into the Adox company.

After the war Heinrich Wirgin came back from America, now as Henry Wirgin, and refounded the Wirgin company in Wiesbaden. An administrative officer of the American occupied zone of Germany sent Heinz Waaske as promising aspirant to Wirgin. At that time Waaske had sold his prototype of a miniature camera to the Americans. In 1951 the talented mechanician Waaske became camera constructor. He constructed the company's first SLR, a model with focal plane shutter, the first camera like that in Western Germany. He also constructed a more elegant SLR prototype, and later a complicated electronically controlled SLR with Compur shutter, and a stereo rangefinder camera.

In 1962 Henry Wirgin bought Franka Kamerawerk. Several 35mm viewfinder cameras had been made in the Franka-Kamerawerk in Bayreuth/Oberfranken, for example the one visible in the picture at the right side of this page, an Edixa with builtin selenium meter and a lens with selectors for shutter speed, aperture and distance.

Made in Bayreuth and Wiesbaden were the small Edixa cameras for 16mm film with removable coupled or uncoupled meter, all derived from an original model designed by Heinz Waaske in Wiesbaden and developed and produced in Wiesbaden and Bayreuth as Edixa 16, Franka 16, or, for the Karstadt department stores, as alka 16.

Waaske left Wirgin since Henry Wirgin had decided to give up camera production sooner or later. Wirgin granted the rights on a new 35mm viewfinder camera to Waaske. This camera was none less than the prototype of what became the famous Rollei 35. Waaske had constructed it at Wirgin company.

In 1967 the Franka-Werk was closed. In 1968 Henry Wirgin closed his original company and continued the production of some camera models in a new smaller plant. In 1971, shortly before its closing, the company introduced a quite modern but heavy SLR camera.

Some cameras sold by Wirgin and its American sales branch Edixa were not made by Wirgin or Franka, mainly the Edixa 8mm movie camera which was made in Japan.

Henry Wirgin died in 1989, in the age of 90 years, in Wiesbaden. He had not only been one of the top entrepreneurs of the West German camera industry, he was also engaged in rewinning normal friendly relationships of non-Jewish Germans to Jewish citizens as chairman of the Society for German-Jewish co-operation.

== 35mm film ==
- Edinex series
- several Edina
- and Edixa models

=== SLR ===
==== M42 ====
- Edixa Reflex series (beginning with the Komet)

variants of the Edixa Reflex series:

- Edixa-Mat Reflex (with rapid mirror)
- Edixa Reflex, budget variants S, BV, SV, Kadett, Ba, Ca, Edixa 500
- Edixa Prismaflex LTL (fixed prism)

==== bayonet ====
- Edixa Rex b, Edixa Rex d, Edixa Rex CdS
- Edixa Rex TTL (fixed prism)

bayonet and M42:

- Edixa Prismat TTL, Edixa Prismat LTL (fixed prism)

==== leaf shutter ====
- Edixa Electronica (fixed prism)

==== Prontor focal plane shutter ====
- Edixa Electronica TL (fixed prism)

==== made by Cosina ====
- Edixa 2 MTL

== 16mm film ==
- Edixa 16 series

16mmsubminiature camera:Edixa 16、Edixa 16M、Edixa 16MB、Franka 16

	subminiature camera	weight	dimension	lens	aperture	shutter
1	Edixa16	200g	108x41x33mm	25mm f/2.8 TRAGEVAR	2.8 - 16	1/30 - 1/150
2	Edixa16M	200g	108x41x33mm	25mm f/2.8 SCHNEIDER XENAR	2.8 - 16	1/30 - 1/150
3	Edixa16MB	200g	108x41x33mm	25mm f/2.8 SCHNEIDER XENAR	2.8 - 16	1/30 - 1/150
4	Edixa16 U	200g	108x41x33mm	25mm f/2.8 SCHNEIDER XENAR	2.8 - 16	1/30 - 1/150
5	Franka 16	200g	108x41x33mm	25mm f/2.8 TRAGEVAR	2.8 - 16	1/30 - 1/150
5	alka 16	200g	108x41x33mm	25mm f/2.8 RODENSTOCK TRINAR	2.8 - 16	1/30 - 1/150

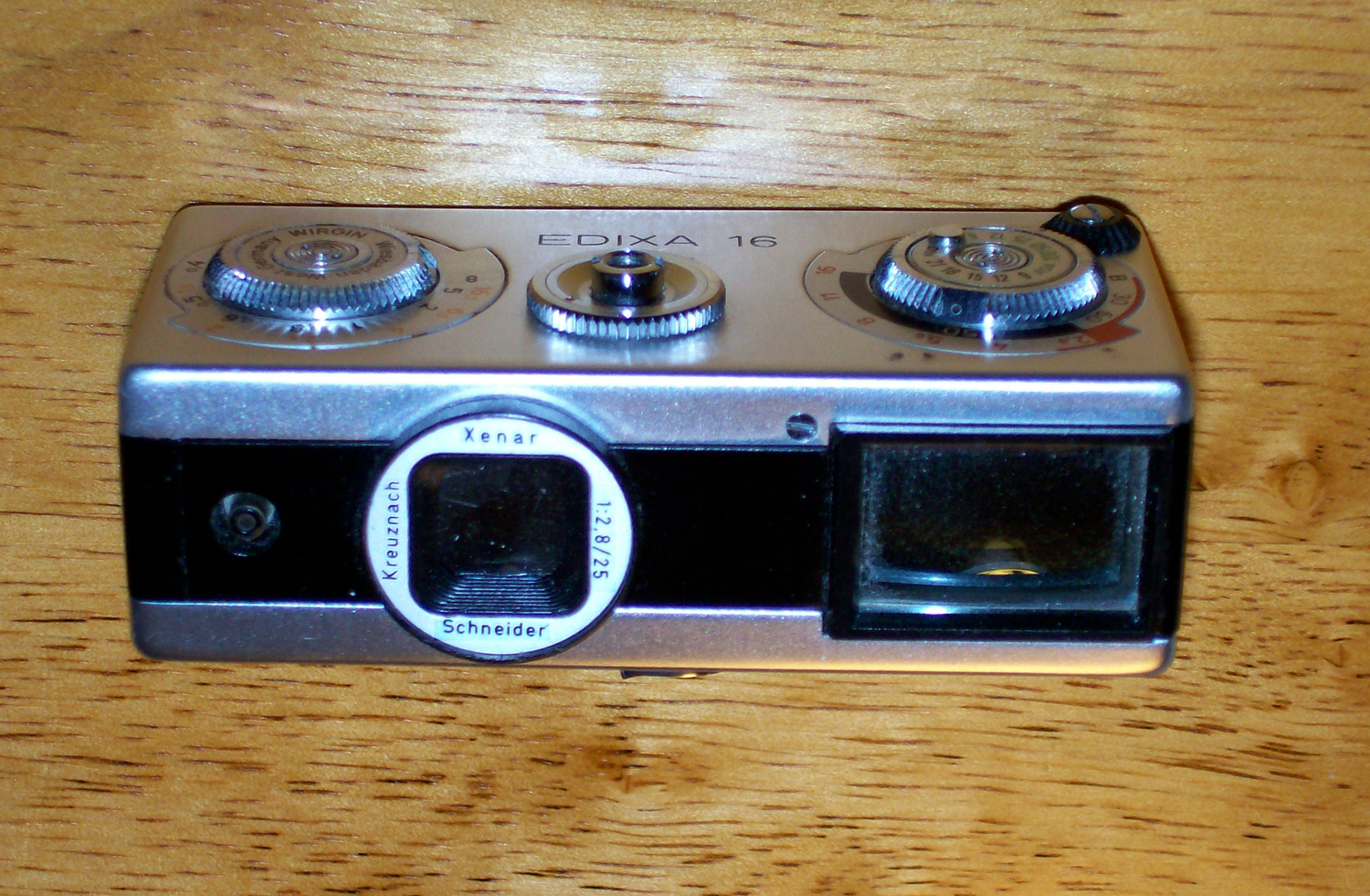
Edixa16M front view

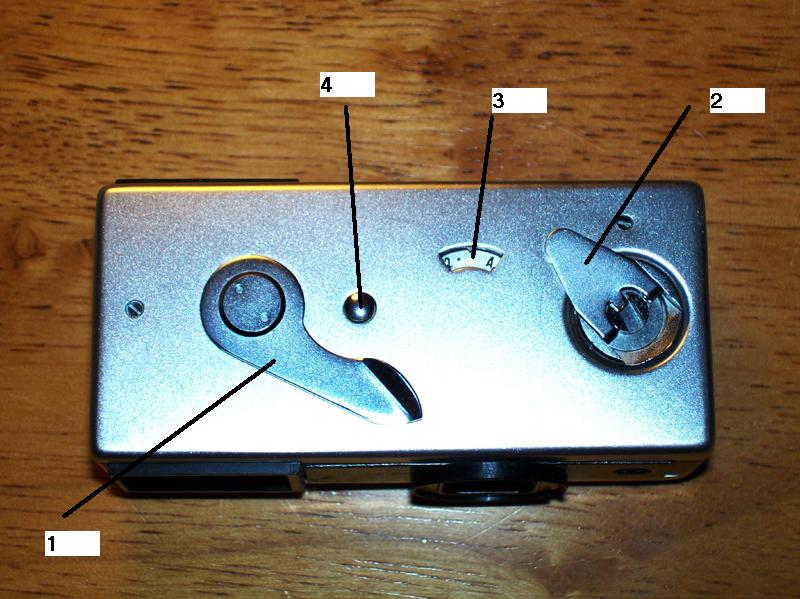
Edixa16mm bottom view :1：Film advance and shutter lever :2：rewind crank :3：counter :3：reverse lock

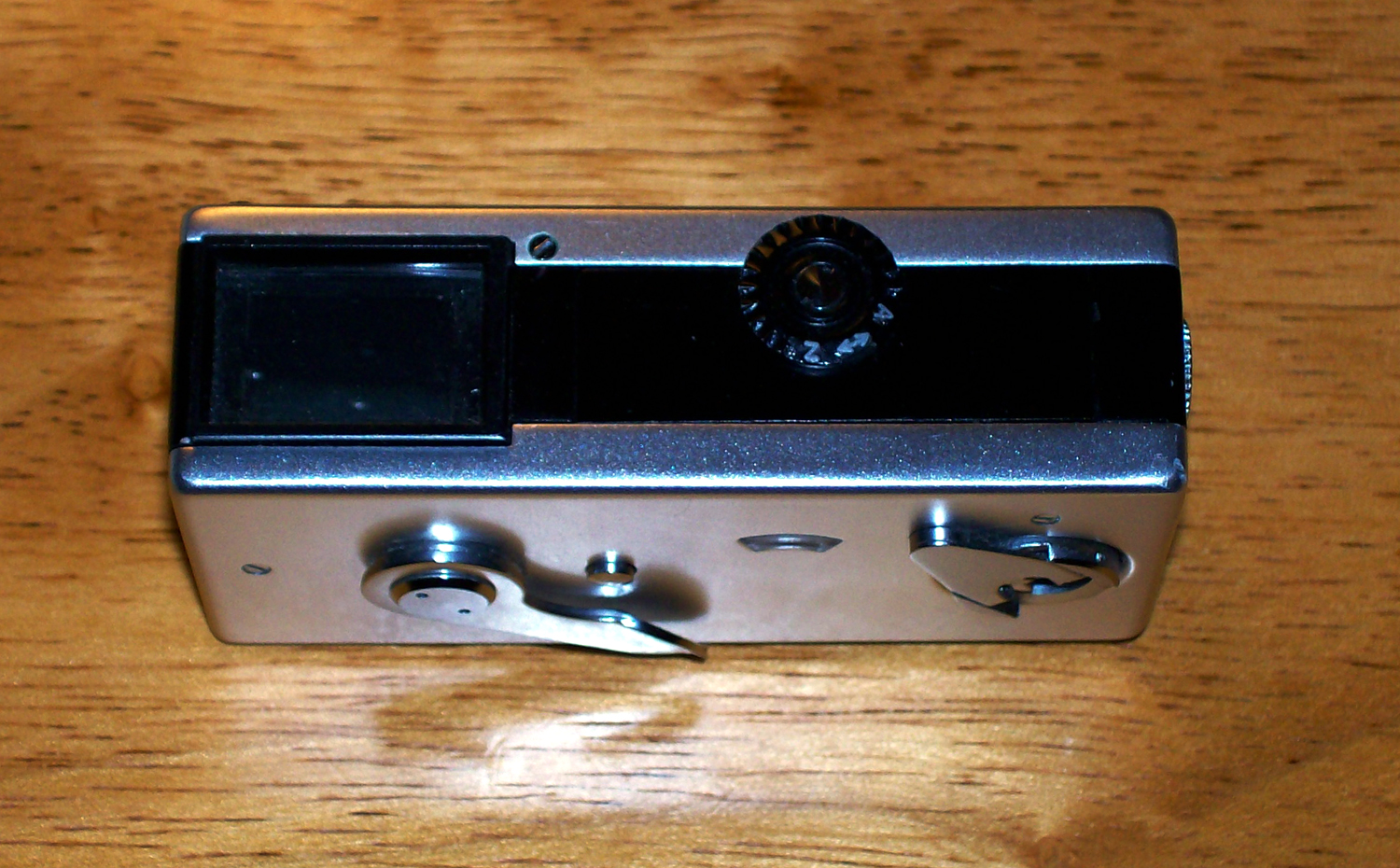
Edixa16M back view

- Body Alunimiu body with plastic trims。
- Lenses，high end Edixa16MB，Edixa16M use Schneider Kreuznach Xena 25mm F/2.8 Tessar 4 element 3 group lens，mid range Edixa16 uses Travegar 25mm f/2.8 Tessar lens，the rest use TRINAR Cooke triplet lens。
- Focusing dial：unit lens movement focusing，40mm to infinity。
- Shutter：four leave in front of the lens shutter，B，1/30，1/60，1/150。

=== Film ===
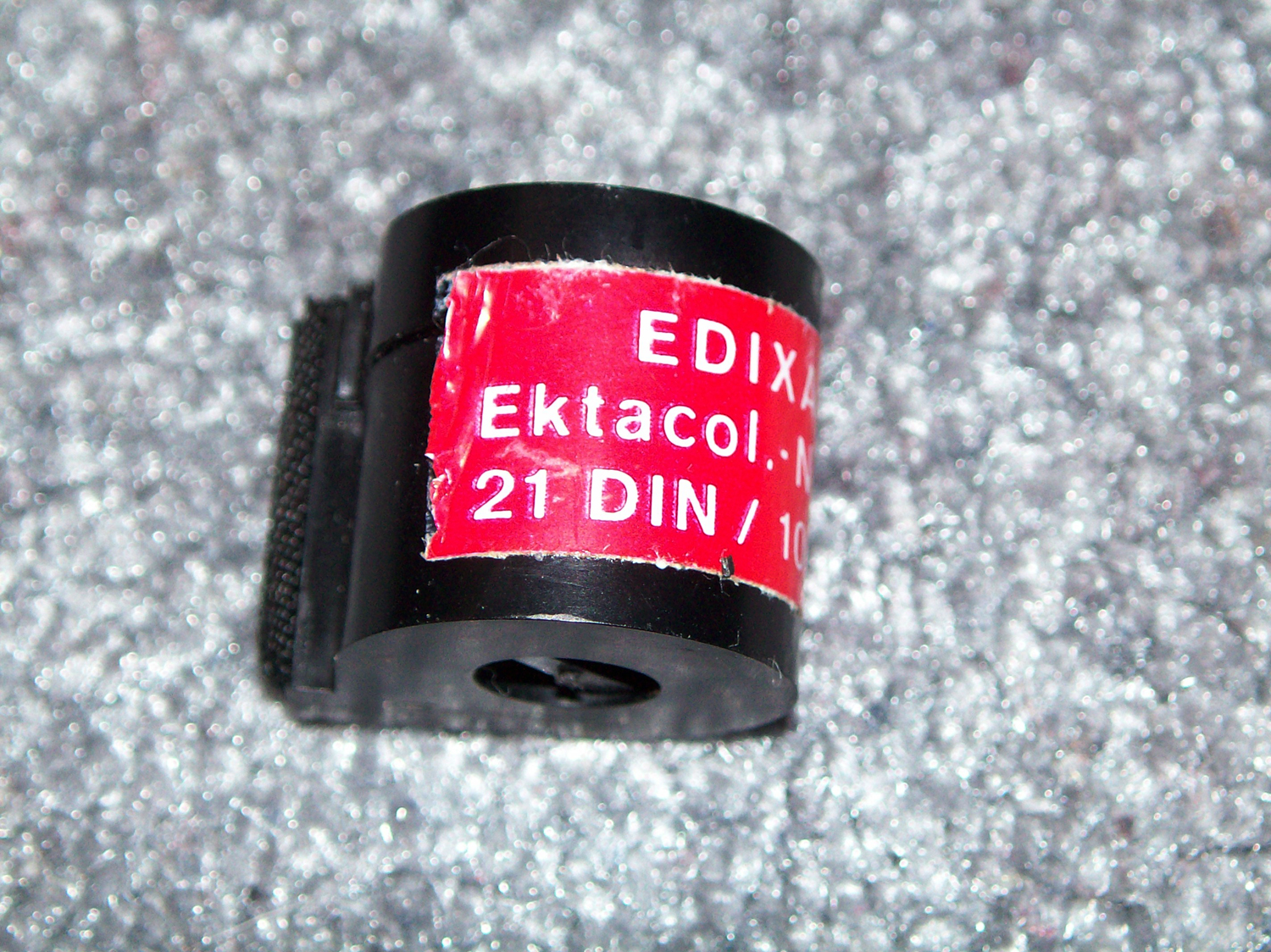
Edixa16mm21DIN Ektacolor film

Edixa16mm uses Rollei 16 type RADA cartridge，loaded with unperforated 16mm film 。Film width 16mm，frame format 14x21mm，20 exposures per cartridge。

=== Accessories ===
1. chain
2. genuine leather case
3. Lens hood
4. color filter set
5. 1m close up attachment lens
6. 0.5m close up lens
7. 0.25m close up lens
8. AG1 flash
9. Development tank
10. Slide projector
11. Selenium exposure meter, directly coupled to the shutter
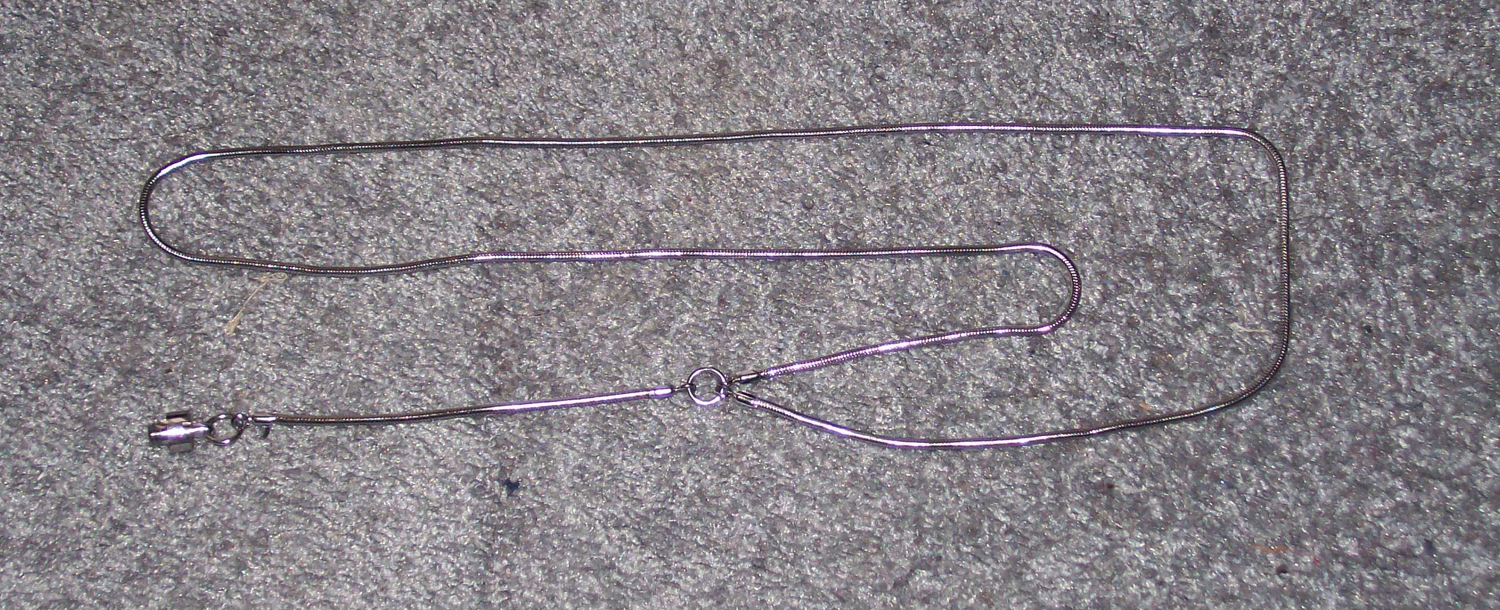
Edixa chain

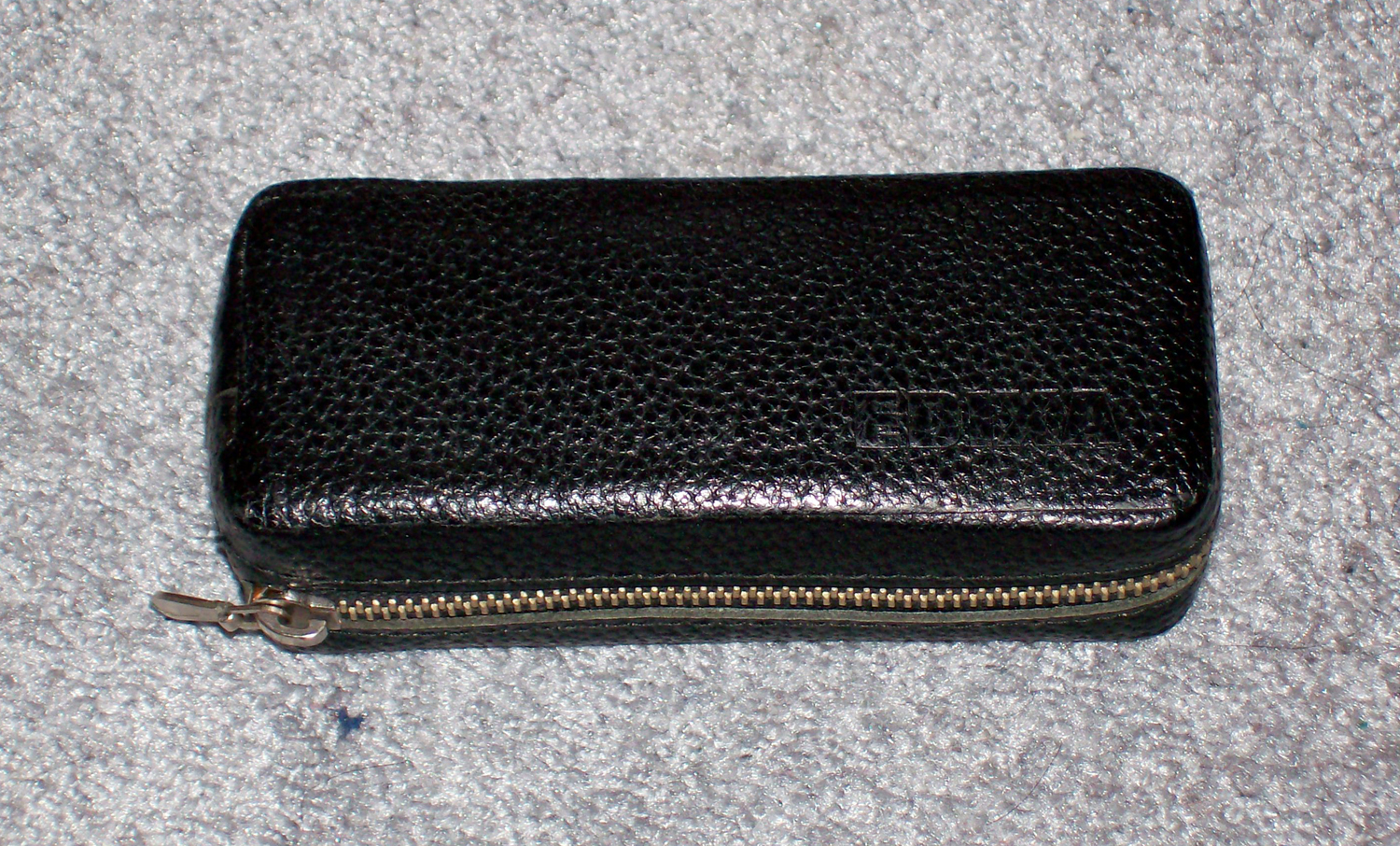
Edixa16M leather case

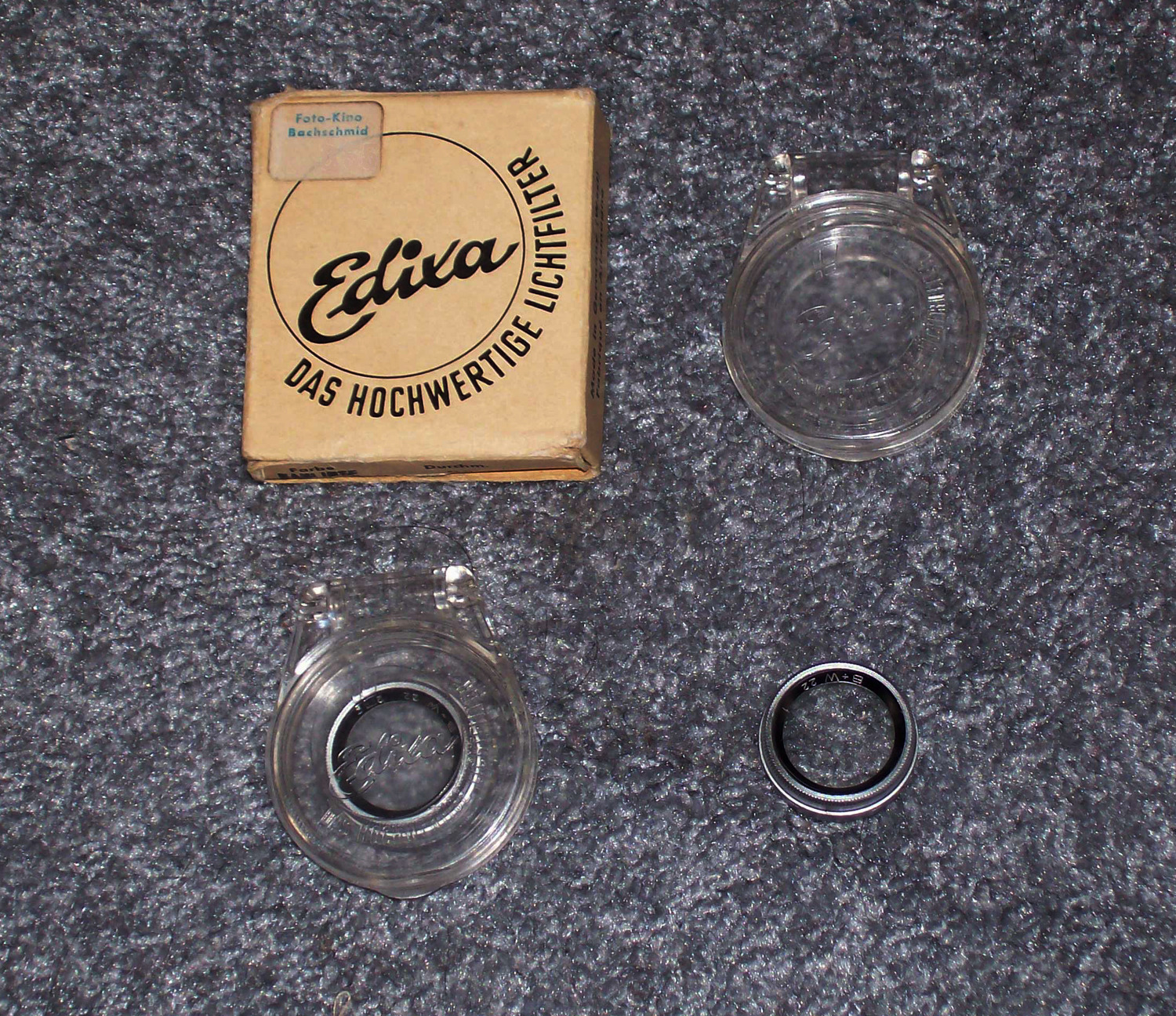
Edixa close up lens set

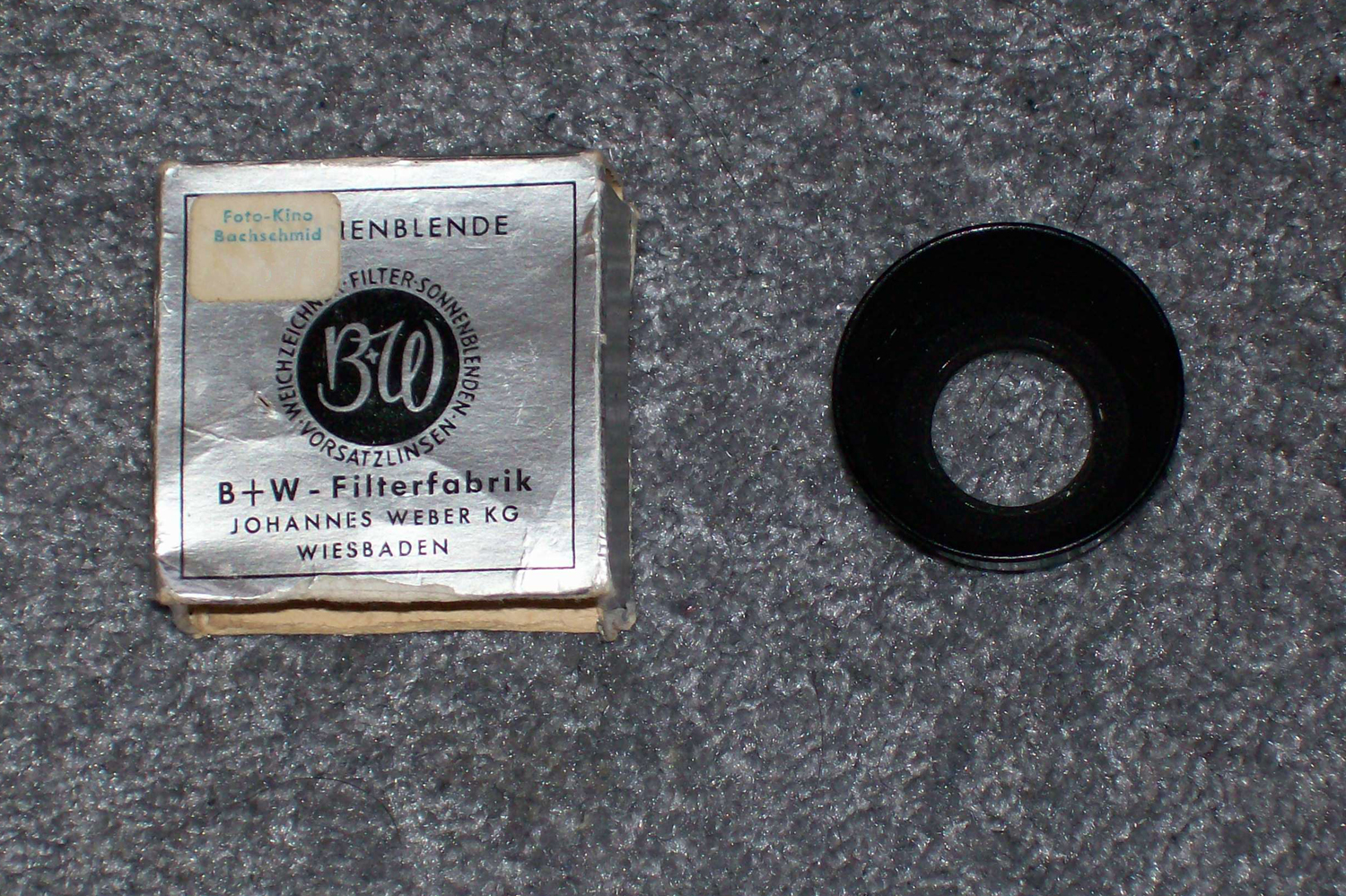
Edixa lens hood

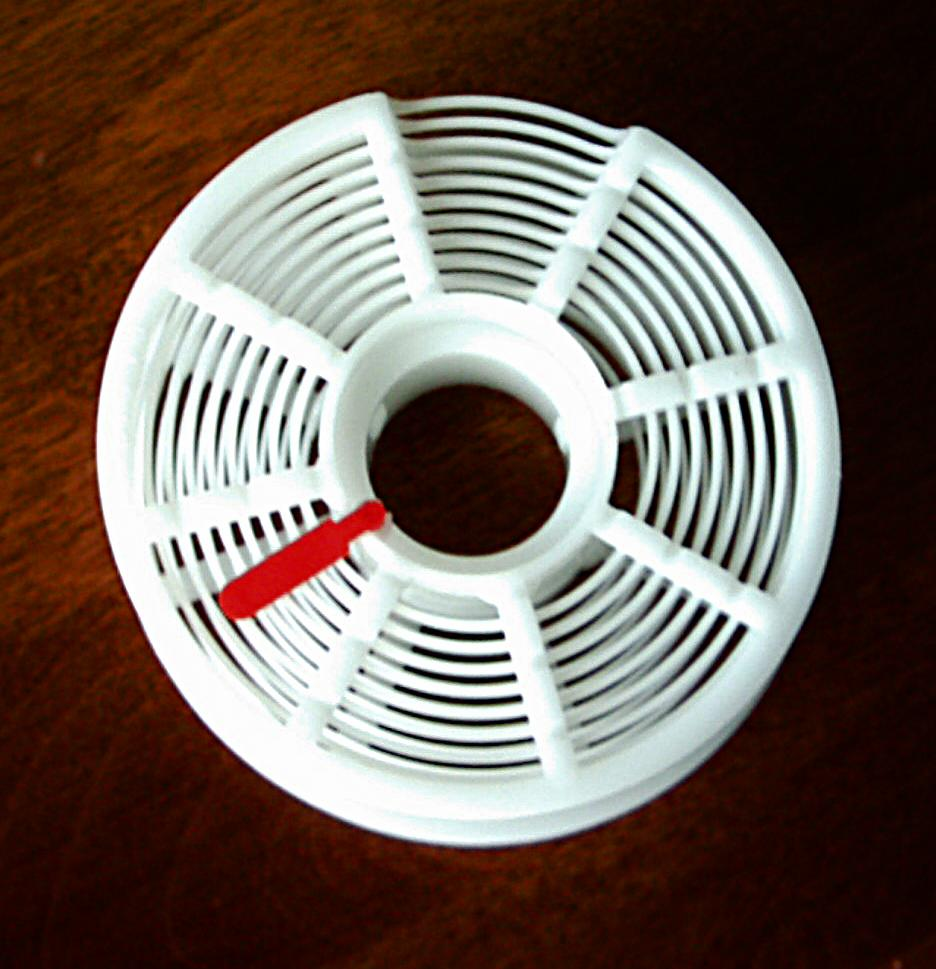
Jobo 16mm development reel

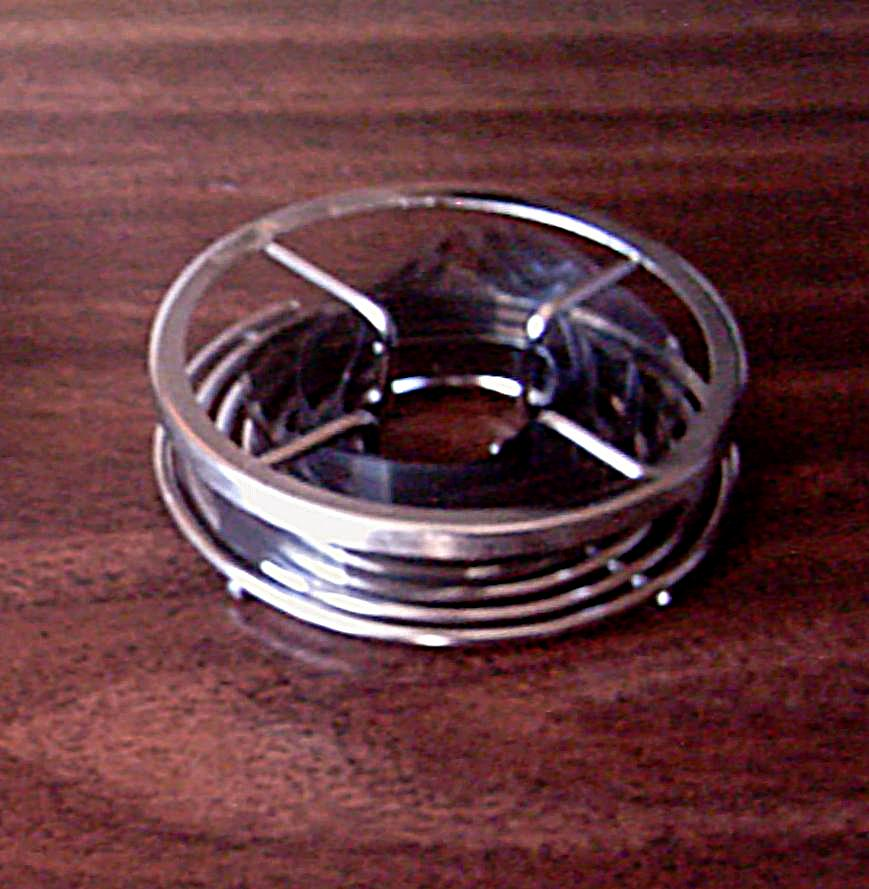
Nikor 16mm stainless steel single side development reel

== 127 film ==
- Gewirette
- Reporter
- Klein-Edinex

== 120 film ==
- some sophisticated bellows cameras and several other folding cameras like the Rofika (=Rollfilmkamera)
- Wirgin Reflex (export version of the Reflecta)
- Wirgin Reflex (export version of the Altiflex)
- Wirgin Reflex (name variant of the Hollywood Reflex)
- the simpler camera line Presto, also made as Adox Sport
