= Edixa =

Brand of German camera manufacturer Wirgin Kamerawerk

Edixa is a brand of camera manufacturer Wirgin Kamerawerk which was based in Wiesbaden, West Germany. The product line included several 35mm cameras and 16mm Edixa 16 subminiature cameras designed by Heinz Waaske from the 1950s to the 1970s.

== 35mm cameras ==
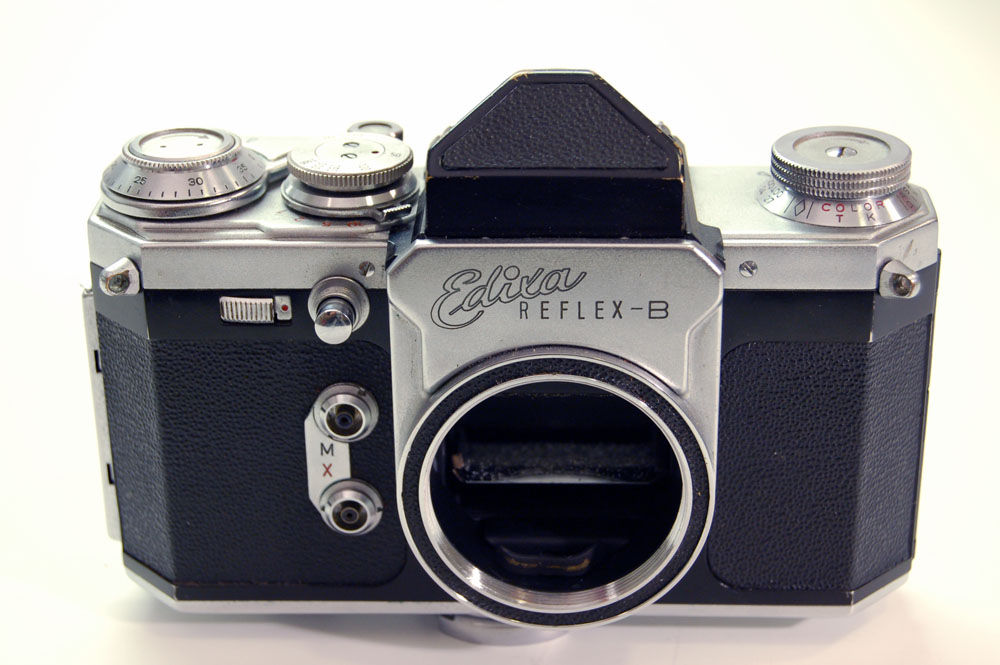
Front view of an Edixa Reflex-B camera body

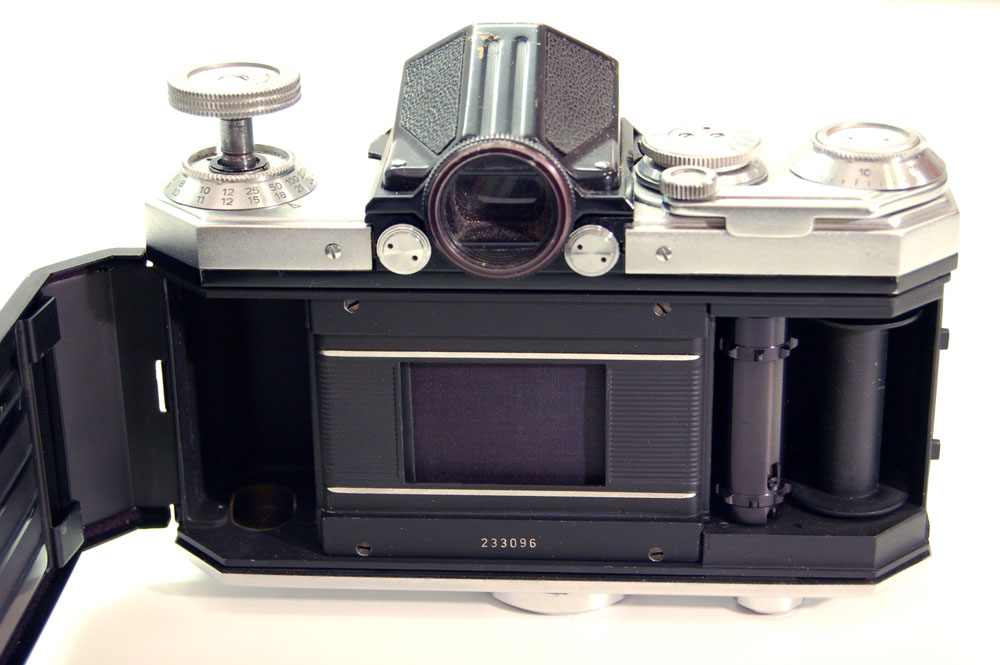
Back view of an Edixa Reflex-B

- Edixa Reflex, with Steinheil Quinon 1.9/55mm, Isco Travegar 2.8/50mm
- Edixa-MAT REFLEX
- Edixa REX TTL
- Universal edixamat cd
- Edixa Stereo
- Edixa Electronica
- Edixa motoric

== 16mm subminiature cameras ==
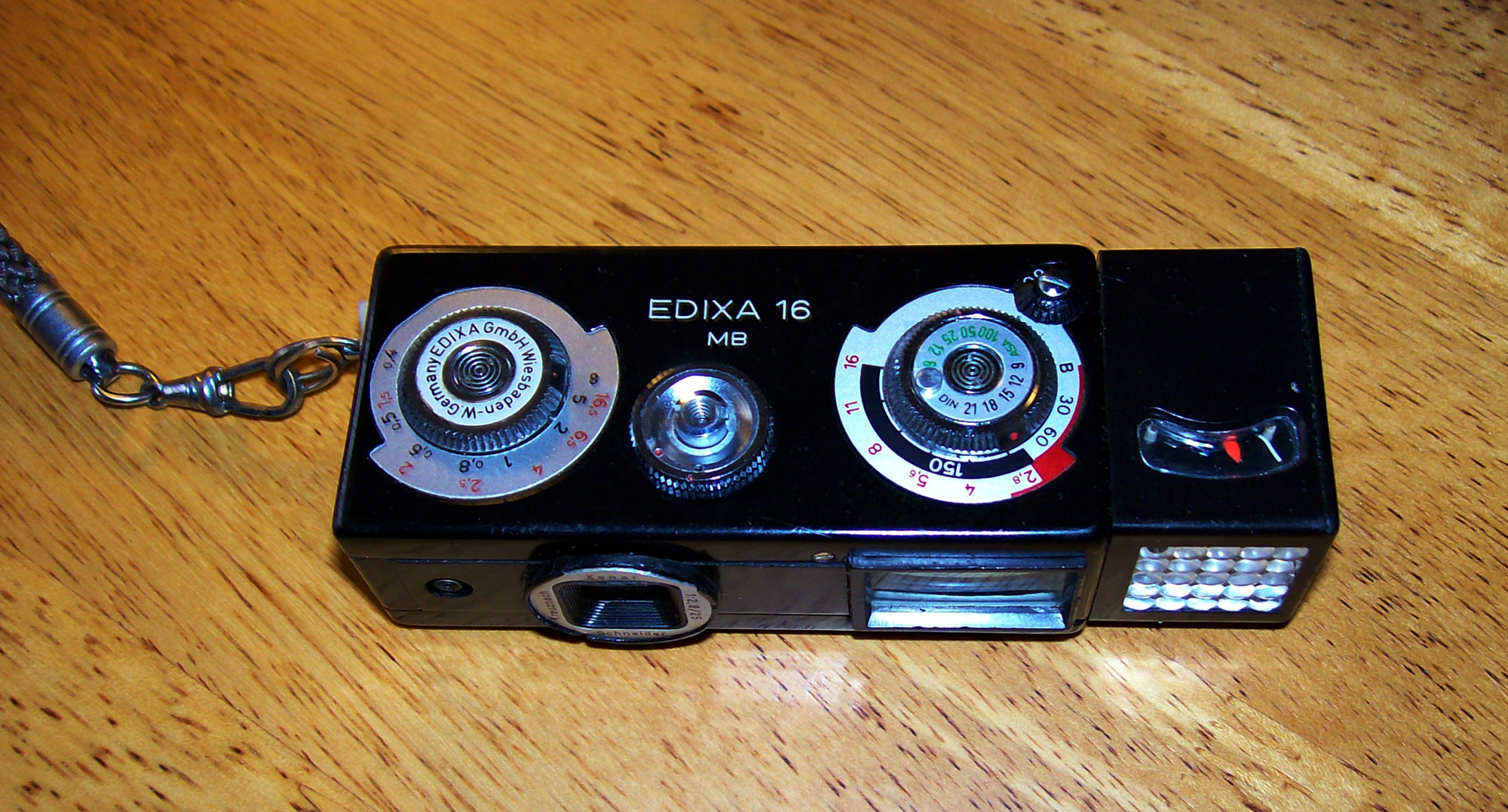
16mm subminiature camera Edixa 16MB

- Edixa 16, with Isco Travegar 2.8/25mm lens
- Edixa 16M, with Schneider-Kreuznach Xenar 2.8/25mm lens
- Edixa 16MB, black model of Edixa 16M
- Edixa 16U
- Franka 16
- alka 16

	subminiature camera	weight	dimension	lens	aperture	shutter
1	Edixa 16	200g	108x41x33mm	25mm f/2.8 TRAGEVAR	2.8 - 16	1/30 - 1/150
2	Edixa 16M	200g	108x41x33mm	25mm f/2.8 SCHNEIDER XENAR	2.8 - 16	1/30 - 1/150
3	Edixa 16MB	200g	108x41x33mm	25mm f/2.8 SCHNEIDER XENAR	2.8 - 16	1/30 - 1/150
4	Edixa 16U	200g	108x41x33mm	25mm f/2.8 SCHNEIDER XENAR	2.8 - 16	1/30 - 1/150
5	Franka 16	200g	108x41x33mm	25mm f/2.8 TRAGEVAR	2.8 - 16	1/30 - 1/150
5	alka 16	200g	108x41x33mm	25mm f/2.8 RODENSTOCK TRINAR	2.8 - 16	1/30 - 1/150

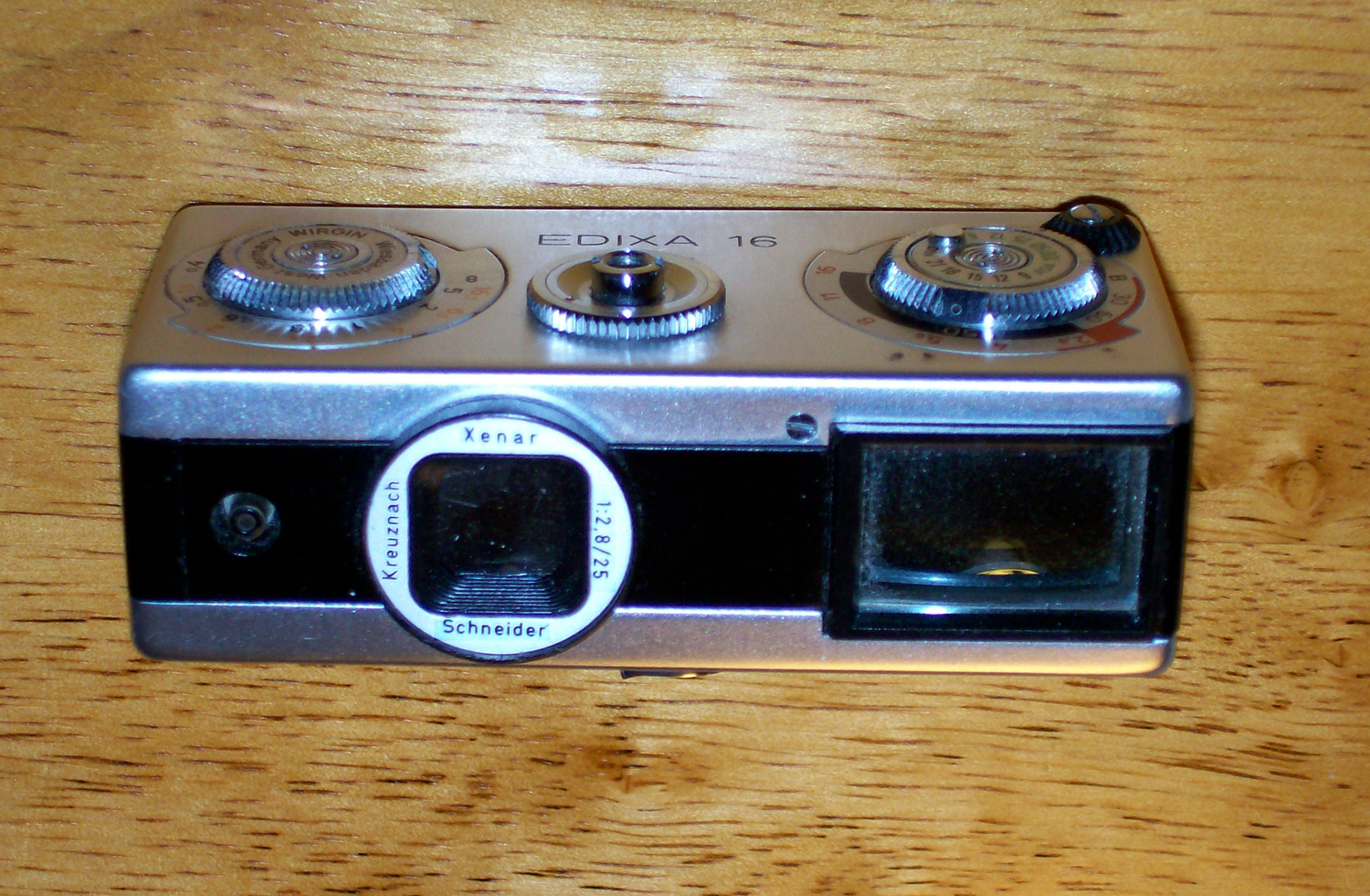
Edixa 16M front view

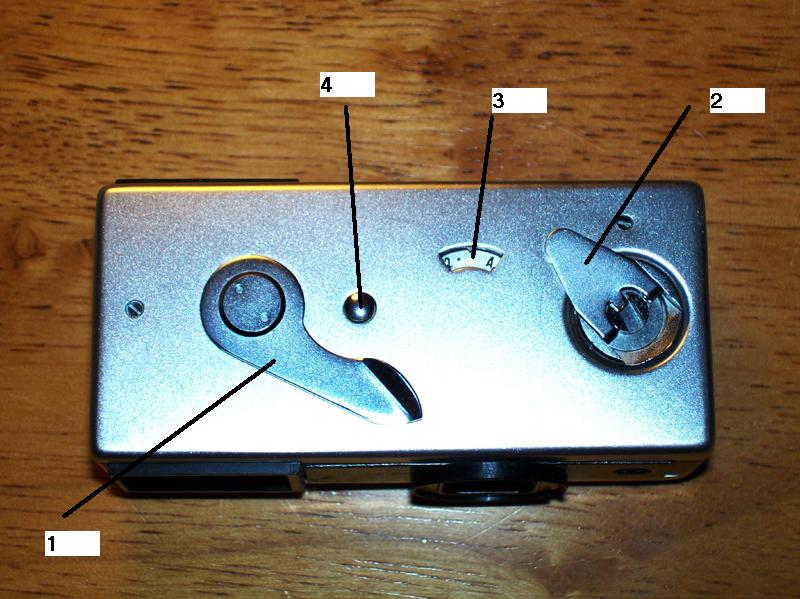
Edixa 16M bottom view :1: Film advance and shutter lever :2: rewind crank :3: counter :4: reverse lock

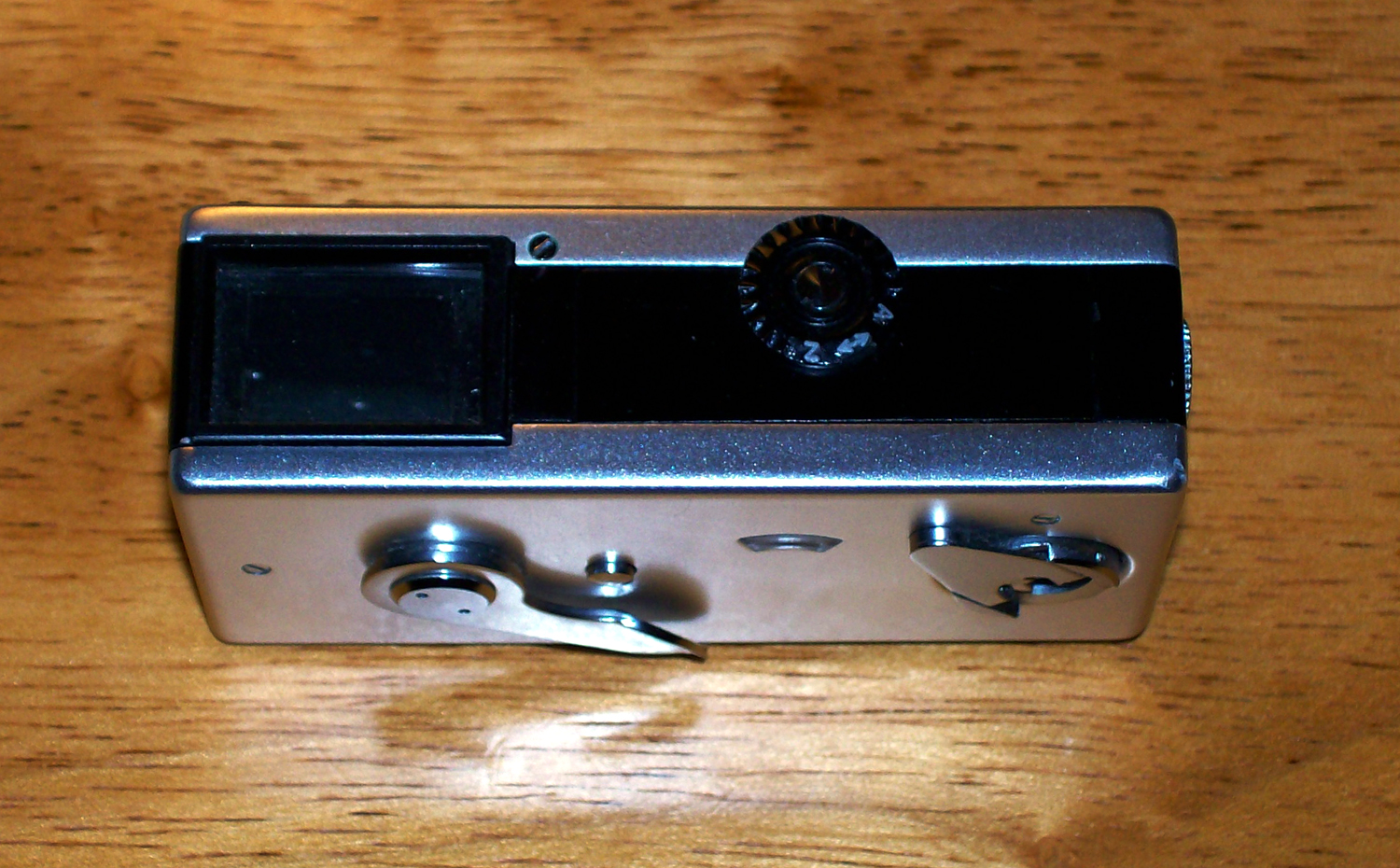
Edixa 16M back view

- Body Alunimiu body with plastic trims。
- Lenses: high-end Edixa 16MB/Edixa 16M uses Schneider-Kreuznach Xenar 25mm f/2.8 Tessar 4-element 3-group lens, mid-range Edixa 16 uses Travegar 25mm f/2.8 Tessar lens, the rest uses TRINAR Cooke triplet lens. *Focusing dial: unit lens movement focusing, 40mm to infinity.
- Shutter: four leaves in front of the lens shutter, B, 1/30, 1/60, 1/150.

=== Film ===
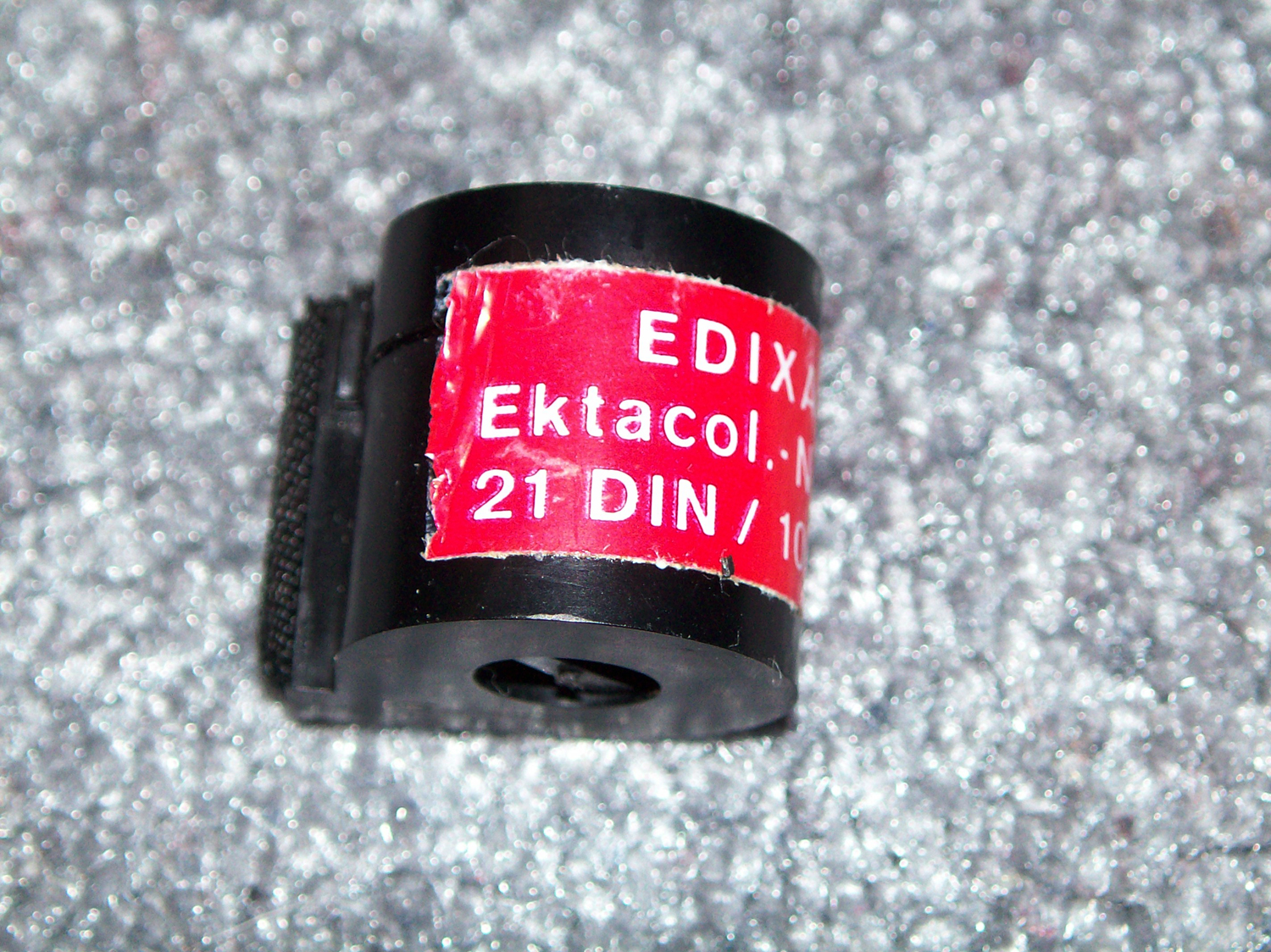
Edixa 16mm 21°DIN Ektacolor film

Edixa 16mm uses Rollei 16 type RADA cartridge, loaded with unperforated 16mm film, film width 16mm， frame format 14x21mm, 20 exposures per cartridge.

=== Accessories ===
1. Chain
2. Genuine leather case
3. Lens hood
4. Color filter set
5. 1m close up attachment lens
6. 0.5m close up lens
7. 0.25m close up lens
8. AG1 flash
9. Selenium exposure meter coupled to the shutter
10. Development tank
11. Slide projector
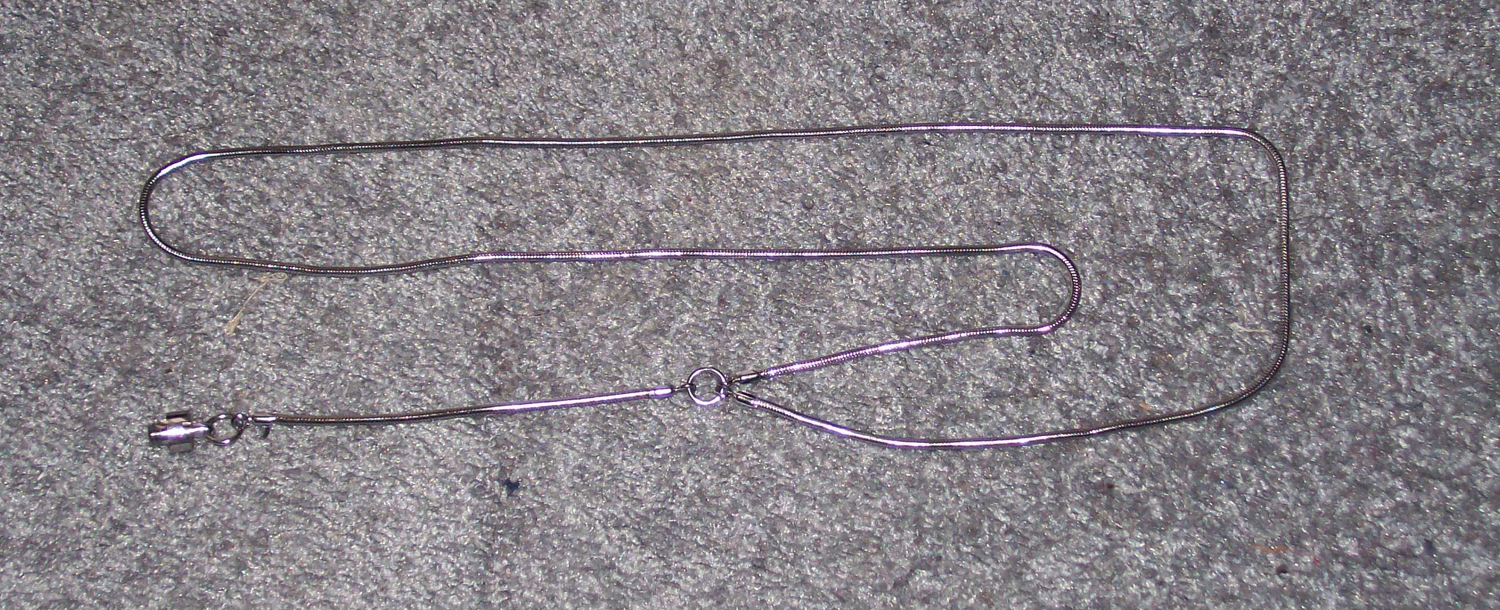
Edixa chain

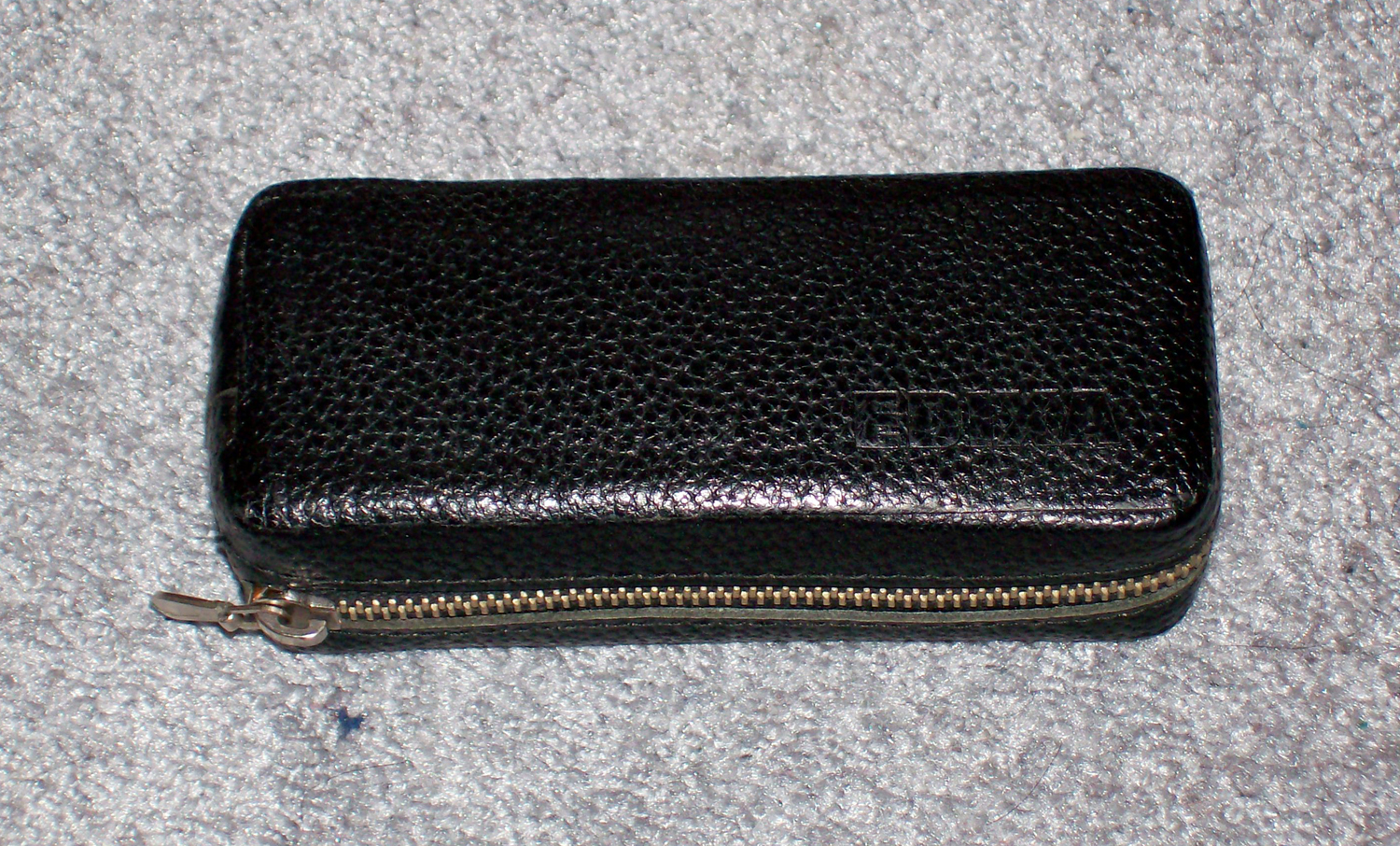
Edixa 16M leather case

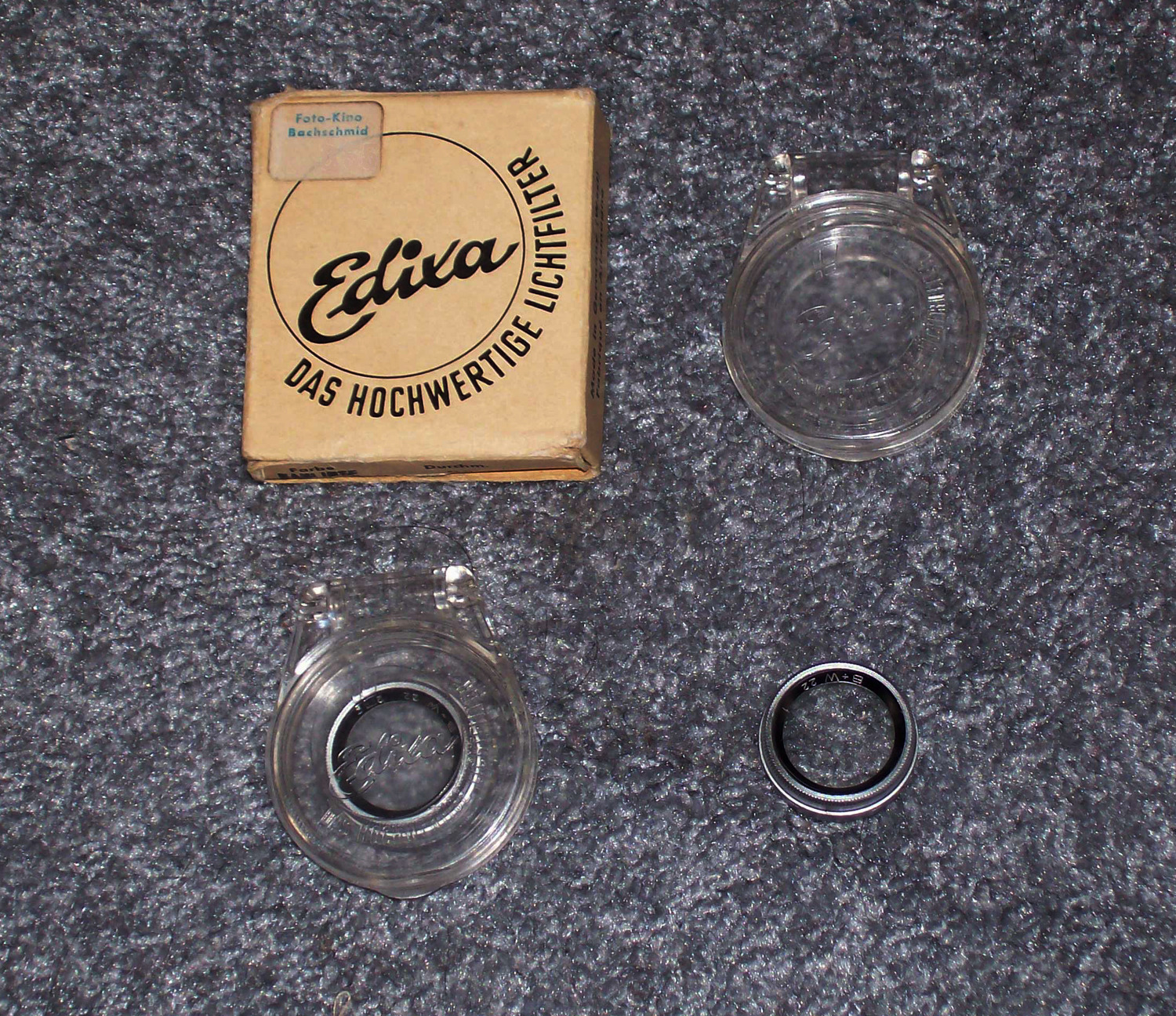
Edixa close up lens set

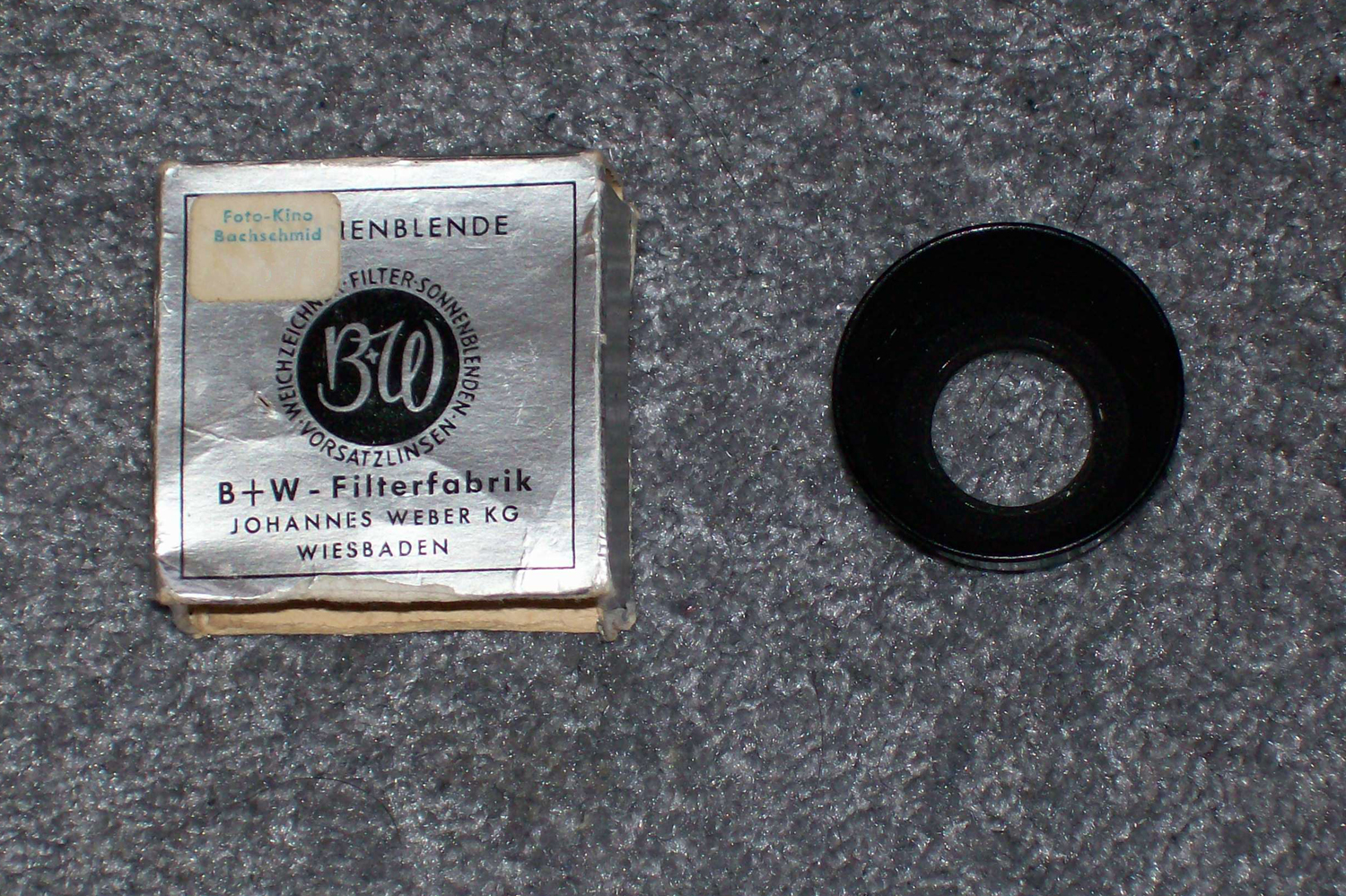
Edixa lens hood
