= Franka Kamerawerk =

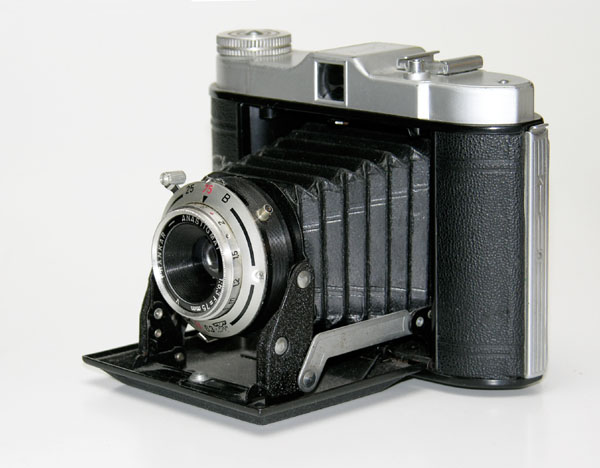
Franka Solida

Franka Kamerawerk was a manufacturer of camera equipment situated in Bayreuth, Germany. It was founded by Franz Vyskocil in 1909. Company was known under several names during its life: Vysko-Fabrik Franz Vyskocil; Weigand & Vyskocil; Frankonia-Kamerawerk; Hogaschwerk; Franka-Kamerawerk. By 1958 Franka had 154 employees and production of 650,000 cameras.

In 1962 Franka was sold to Henry Wirgin (Wirgin) and camera production ceased in 1967.

== Camera models ==
- Bonafix
- Bubi
- Champion
- Francolor
- Franka
- Frankamatic
- Frankarette
- Record
- Rolfix
- Rollop
- Solida
- Solida Record
- Solida Jr.
- Super Frankarette
- Weitz
