= Edixa Reflex =

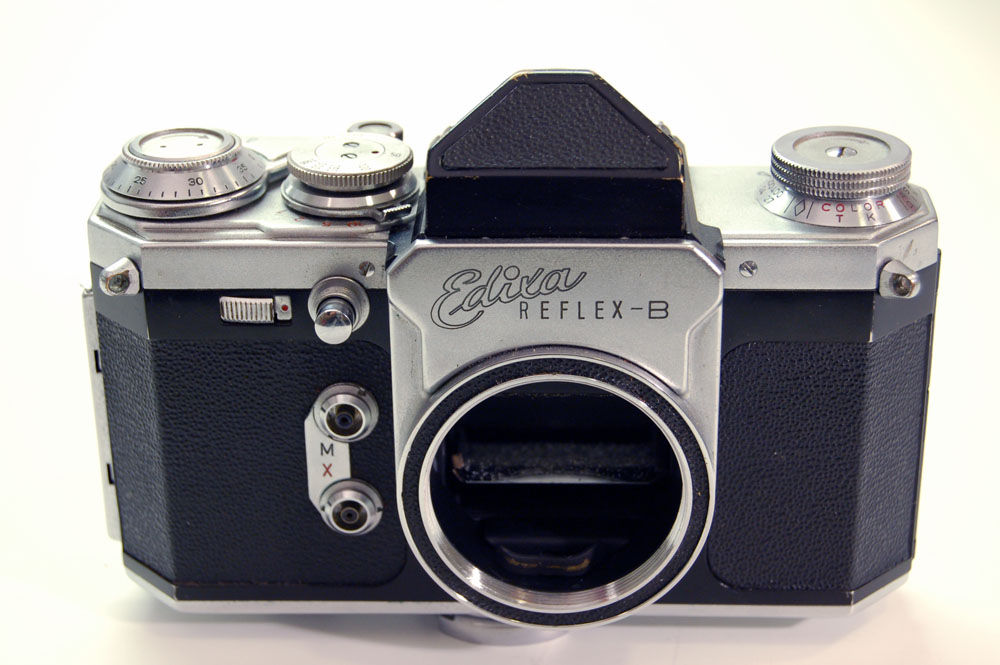

Overview
- Type: 35 mm SLR

Lens
- Lens mount: Screw (M42)

Focusing
- Focus: manual

The Edixa Reflex cameras, introduced in 1954, was a West German series of SLR's with focal plane shutter. They were manufactured by Wirgin. The original name of the model was Komet.
