= Ricoh (disambiguation) =

Ricoh is a Japanese multinational imaging and electronics company.

Ricoh may also refer to:

- Coventry Building Society Arena (formerly Ricoh Arena), Coventry, England, a complex which includes a sports stadium, an exhibition hall, a hotel and a casino
- Ricoh Astronauts, a former name of Amsterdam Basketball, a professional club
- Ricoh Black Rams, a Japanese rugby union team
- Ricoh Coliseum, Toronto, Canada, an arena used for agricultural displays, ice hockey and trade shows
- Ricoh Cup, a Zhongguo Qiyuan Go competition in China
- Ricoh Open, a former name of Rosmalen Grass Court Championships, a tennis competition
- Ricoh Xinxiu Cup, a Go competition in China

== See also ==
=== Ricoh manufactures ===
- Ricoh 2A03, an 8-bit microprocessor in the Nintendo Entertainment System video game console
- Ricoh 500, an optical camera
- Ricoh 5A22, a microprocessor for the Super Nintendo Entertainment System video game console
- Ricoh Caplio 400G Wide, a digital camera
- Ricoh Caplio 500SE, a digital camera
- Ricoh Caplio G3, a digital camera
- Ricoh Caplio RX, a digital camera
- Ricoh CX1, a digital camera
- Ricoh G700, a digital camera
- Ricoh GR Digital, a digital camera
- Ricoh GR Digital II, a digital camera
- Ricoh GR digital cameras
- Ricoh GR and GR II, digital cameras
- Ricoh GR film cameras, optical cameras
- Ricoh GXR, a digital camera
- Ricoh Synchrofax, a dictating machine
- Ricoh WG-4, a digital camera
- Ricoh WG-20, a digital camera
- Ricoh WG-30, a digital camera
- Ricoh WG-M1, a digital camera
- Ricoh XR-P, an optical camera

=== Other ===
- Stewart Organization, Inc. v. Ricoh Corp., a United States Supreme Court case
