= 1938 Sacramento Solons season =

1938 Sacramento Solons
- League: Pacific Coast League
- Ballpark: Edmonds Field
- City: Sacramento, California
- Record: 95–82
- League place: 3rd
- Managers: Bill Killefer

The 1938 Sacramento Solons season saw the Sacramento Solons baseball team win the Pacific Coast League (PCL) pennant. Led by manager Bill Killefer, the Solons finished third in the PCL with a 95–82 record, but qualified for the PCL's four-team playoffs. They defeated the first-place Los Angeles Angels, four games to one, in the opening round, and then defeated the fourth-place San Francisco Seals in the championship series, again by four games to one, to win the PCL's President's Trophy. However, the PCL's rules were changed in 1938 such that the pennant was awarded in 1938 to Angels as the team with the best record in the regular season.

Left-hander Tony Freitas was the team's leading pitcher, compiling a 24–11 record and 2.67 earned run average (ERA) in 290 inning pitched. Cotton Pippen also pitched well, compiling a 17–8 record with a 3.15 ERA in 223 inning pitched.

The Solons had a team batting of .250, the lowest among all nine PCL teams, and 42 points lower than the San Francisco Seals' .292 team batting average. Further, no Sacramento batter ranked among the league's top 25 in batting average.

== 1938 PCL standings ==
Team	W	L	Pct.	GB
Los Angeles Angels	105	73	.590	--
Seattle Rainiers	100	75	.571	3.5
Sacramento Solons	95	82	.537	9.5
San Francisco Seals	93	85	.522	12.0
San Diego Padres	92	85	.520	12.5
Portland Beavers	79	96	.451	21.0
Hollywood Stars	79	99	.444	22.5
Oakland Oaks	65	113	.446	40.0

== Statistics ==
=== Batting ===
Note: Pos = Position; G = Games played; AB = At bats; H = Hits; Avg. = Batting average; HR = Home runs; SLG = Slugging percentage; RBI = Runs batted in; SB = Stolen bases

Pos	Player	G	AB	H	Avg.	HR	SLG	RBI	SB
CF	Buster Adams	67	270	79	.293	9	.478	36	24
2B	Dib Williams	177	675	190	.281	15	.421	88	13
SS	Joe Orengo	177	622	172	.277	8	.453	83	11
C	Herman Franks	143	470	129	.274	9	.406	67	2
LF	Max Marshall	162	656	175	.267	11	.393	57	16
1B	Larry Barton	164	580	153	.264	7	.434	74	7
RF	Nick Cullop	138	485	124	.256	20	.423	66	7
CF	Bill James	100	334	85	.254	2	.338	40	4
3B	Johnny Vergez	167	583	145	.249	16	.386	80	19
C	Frank Grube	72	181	40	.221	0	.232	18	0
LF	Bud Hafey	54	172	37	.215	3	.331	11	2
CF	Ray Dieffenback	41	106	21	.198	1	.245		

=== Pitching ===
Note: G = Games pitched; IP = Innings pitched; W = Wins; L = Losses; PCT = Win percentage; ERA = Earned run average; SO = Strikeouts

Player	G	IP	W	L	PCT	ERA	SO
Tony Freitas	38	290.0	24	11	.686	2.67	
Cotton Pippen	32	223.0	17	8	.680	3.15	
Bill Walker	31	226.0	17	12	.586	2.95	
Bill Schmidt	43	280.0	17	12	.548	3.66	
Dick Newsome	33	180.0	11	11	.500	3.50	
Lee Sherill	25	159.0	5	10	.333	3.79	
