= EncryptEase =

- Media type: Optical disc (Ricoh RR)
- Capacity: 600 MB
- Read mechanism: 6,000 kbit/s maximum
- Developed by: Ricoh
- Manufactured by: Ricoh
- Extended from: CD-ROM and CD-R
- Released: December 2005; 20 years ago
- Discontinued: January 2008; 18 years ago

EncryptEase is a discontinued optical disc media format for Windows personal computers introduced by Ricoh in 2005. It is a hybrid compact disc (CD), with a CD-ROM data track at the beginning of the disc containing Ricoh's encryption software and the rest of the disc being a CD-R data track which can be recorded onto by the user. Ricoh intended for users to store their personal data onto the disc's recordable data track encrypted using the built-in software on the CD-ROM portion of the disc.

== Description ==
Close-up of an EncryptEase disc, showing the transition between the stamped CD-ROM layer and the dye CD-R layer. Faintly visible between the beginning of the CD-R portion and the edge of the disc is the transition between the recorded and unrecorded portion of the CD-R layer.

Microscopic close-up of the same disc, better showing the transition between the CD-ROM layer (top) and the CD-R layer (bottom)

EncryptEase discs were the first product to employ Ricoh's RR ("CD-ROM + CD-R") hybrid compact disc (CD) technology. The discs are composed of two different data tracks: a CD-ROM data track at the beginning of the disc and a CD-R data track throughout the rest of the disc. The CD-ROM data track cannot be modified, owing to being a stamped track, while the CD-R portion is recordable by the end user. The discs can be recorded at drive speeds of up to 40× (6,000 kbit/s). For EncryptEase, Ricoh stamped a proprietary encryption utility and device driver for Windows onto the CD-ROM portion of the disc, intended for users to their personal data onto the disc's recordable data track in an encrypted format for security. Because the CD-ROM portion cannot be modified, users were encouraged to run the encryption utility directly from the disc, as the encryption software's executable is protected from modification by a potential threat actor.

The built-in software encrypts files onto the disc with 2048-bit encryption. Users drag and drop the files and folders they wish to be encrypted onto a window representing one session's worth of data. A maximum of 20 sessions can be written to the recordable section, with each section having its own unique password. A date can be set after which Windows can no longer access the recorded data for a particular session. This can be circumvented, however, by setting the current system date in the BIOS before this date. A device driver must be installed before the encryption software can function. The data is encrypted as soon as the user commits to recording a session. The software does not support backing up data across multiple discs, limiting the capacity of individual sessions to a maximum of 600 MB. The software supports versions of Windows between 98 SE and XP Service Pack 2.

== Release and reception ==
Site of the Garden Grove, California, headquarters of Kano Technologies, the North American distributor of EncryptEase

Ricoh released EncryptEase in North American and Germany in December 2005, in Japan in 2006, and in France in 2007. Ricoh both developed the encryption software in-house and manufactured the specialized RR discs in Japan. The company hired Kano Technologies of Garden Grove, California, to distribute EncryptEase discs throughout North America. A version of EncryptEase on a combination DVD-ROM and DVD-R disc, as well as a version combining CD-ROM and CD-RW (rewritable), was reportedly in development in between April 2006 and May 2007, although these were ultimately never released.

Peter Piazza of Security Management wrote that the software lacked very many bells and whistles and felt that the included software's limitation of 20 sessions was a hindrance to users who needed the ability to revise their data continuously while being able to encrypt it. He also noted the presence of poorly machine-translated English in the instruction manual and some of the dialog boxes. On the whole, however, he called it simple to use and requiring very little user intervention. Computerworld's Robert Mitchell wrote that the individual discs were expensive at $7 each (equivalent to $11 in 2025) and recommended purchasers only use the product to as a short-term backup solution or as a way of handing sensitive data to other people rather than for long-term archival. Mitchell highlighted the software's Windows exclusivity and wrote that further releases of Windows past XP were liable to break the software.

Henry Baltazar of eWeek on the other hand was impressed with the price, performance, and ease of use and wrote that it provided "a data protection solution for even the tightest of SMB budgets". Purav Sanghani of Anandtech wrote that the software's session numerical labeling scheme was too opaque wished that it was capable of letting users label sessions with letters as well. He also warned that the encryption scheme was liable to eventually being cracked.

Ricoh discontinued EncryptEase in around 2008.
