= G700 =

G700 may refer to:

- Gulfstream G700, a jet aircraft
- Ricoh G700, a digital compact camera
- Sony Ericsson G700, a mobile phone
