= L-Tron Corporation =

American technology company

- Company type: Private
- Industry: Data collection, Law enforcement technology, Industrial automation
- Founded: 1975; 51 years ago
- Founder: Lee Fasoli
- Headquarters: Victor, New York, U.S.
- Key people: Trevor DiMarco (CEO)
- Products: OSCR360; 4910LR Driver's License Scanner; mDLR-1 Mobile ID Reader; Barcode scanners; Data collection systems
- Services: Law enforcement technology; Industrial automation; Data acquisition; Workflow optimization
- Website: l-tron.com

L-Tron Corporation is an American technology company based in Victor, New York, specializing in data acquisition, data collection, and industrial automation solutions for law enforcement, government, manufacturing, and warehousing sectors. Founded in 1975 by Lee Fasoli, the company has grown from a barcode scanner reseller into a provider of patented law enforcement technology deployed in over 3,000 municipalities across all 50 states and Canada. L-Tron partners with Fortune 500 companies and government agencies and holds ISO 9001:2015 certification.

== History ==
=== Founding and early years ===
L-Tron Corporation was founded in 1975 by Lee Fasoli, who started the business as a barcode scanner reseller operating from the basement of his home in the Rochester metropolitan area. The company initially focused on distributing barcode scanning equipment and data collection hardware to commercial and industrial clients.

=== Expansion under the DeRose family ===
The company was subsequently purchased by Fasoli's daughter, Gayle F. DeRose, and her husband, RAD DeRose, who expanded the business beyond reselling into new markets including law enforcement, healthcare, and government agencies. Under their leadership, L-Tron developed proprietary products and engineering capabilities, established partnerships with technology manufacturers including Zebra Technologies, Honeywell, and Advantech, and achieved ISO 9001:2015 certification in 2017. RAD DeRose served as president and CEO, while Gayle DeRose served as COO and Director of Marketing. L-Tron was named to the Rochester Top 100 list of fastest-growing privately held companies in the Greater Rochester region, ranking No. 44 in 2011 and No. 19 in 2014. In 2014, the company was also named to the Inc. 5000 list of fastest-growing private companies in the United States. In 2017, the company was featured in Business Solutions Magazine for its projected double-digit growth.

In 2018, the company relocated to new headquarters at Lehigh Crossing in Victor, New York. Robert Duffy, then CEO of the Greater Rochester Chamber of Commerce and former Mayor of Rochester and Lieutenant Governor of New York, toured the facility and received demonstrations of L-Tron's law enforcement products.

=== Current ownership ===
Trevor DiMarco joined L-Tron in 2014 as Director of Solutions and was subsequently promoted to Vice President of Sales and Engineering before becoming president and CEO in 2022. DiMarco holds a bachelor's degree in mechanical engineering from the University of Rochester and an MBA from Babson College. L-Tron remains a family-run business.

On October 16, 2025, L-Tron celebrated its 50th anniversary at Radio Social in Rochester.

== Products ==
=== OSCR360 ===
OSCR360 is a patented system developed by L-Tron for capturing 360-degree spherical photographs of crime scenes, crash sites, fire scenes, and other locations for documentation, investigation, and courtroom presentation. The system uses a Ricoh Theta camera to capture a spherical photograph with associated GPS coordinates and cardinal direction in under four seconds, then organizes the imagery with linked digital evidence in L-Tron's proprietary software.

On June 23, 2022, L-Tron was granted U.S. Patent No. 11,272,090 for the OSCR360 system, titled "Event data and location-linked spherical imaging system."

The system was developed in collaboration with retired law enforcement officers, including John Dobies, a retired New York State Department of Environmental Conservation investigator with over 28 years of experience, and Pete Butler, a retired Rochester Police Department evidence technician, who brought a combined 53 years of law enforcement experience to the project. Andrew McNeill, a retired Monroe County Sheriff's Office crime scene analyst and IAI-certified Senior Crime Scene Analyst, serves as L-Tron's Director of Forensic Education.

==== Adoption ====
OSCR360 is deployed in more than 32 states and has been adopted by agencies including the Boston Police Department, the Austin Police Department, the Sacramento Police Department, and the New York City Fire Department (FDNY). In 2024, the Dutchess County District Attorney's Office used federal grant funding to purchase OSCR360 systems for the Dutchess County Sheriff's Office, the City of Poughkeepsie Police Department, and the Town of Poughkeepsie Police Department. In December 2018, L-Tron secured New York State Contract No. PT66773, making OSCR360 and the 4910LR available to all New York State government entities eligible for state funding. L-Tron also holds a GSA Multiple Award Schedule contract, enabling direct procurement by federal agencies.

The Henry Lee Institute of Criminal Justice and Forensic Sciences at the University of New Haven, founded by forensic scientist Henry C. Lee, acquired OSCR360 for use in its college-level forensics curriculum after a demonstration to Dr. Lee.

==== Courtroom use ====
OSCR360 has been used in criminal prosecutions in Monroe County. In the 2017 Rideout murder trial, Second Assistant District Attorney Timothy Prosperi used OSCR360 during closing arguments to present over 700 pieces of evidence to the jury, resulting in two second-degree murder convictions and three tampering with evidence convictions. Prosperi, who received the 2018 Robert M. Morgenthau Award from the District Attorneys Association of the State of New York, has handled over 35 complex homicide cases during nearly 30 years at the Monroe County District Attorney's Office. OSCR360 was also used during witness testimony in the prosecution of Jonathan Ortiz for second-degree murder, providing a virtual walkthrough of the crime scene for the jury. In Dutchess County, OSCR360 was used in the investigation of the 2022 homicide of Melanie Chianese, which resulted in the conviction of Paul Senecal. In January 2018, 13WHAM reporter Carlet Cleare visited L-Tron's office for a news segment on how district attorneys were using OSCR360 in criminal trials, including the Jonathan Ortiz murder prosecution.

=== 4910LR Driver's License Scanner ===
The 4910LR is an area-imaging scanner designed for law enforcement use in patrol vehicles. It reads barcodes on driver's licenses, vehicle registrations, and laptop screens at traffic stops, accident scenes, and incident scenes. The scanner is compatible with electronic citation (eCitation) software platforms including TraCS, digiTICKET, MOVE, eCWS, KYOPS, SECTOR, and E-TIX.

The 4910LR and its predecessors, the 4710LR and 4810LR, have been deployed in more than 2,000 municipalities across all 50 states. The Pennsylvania State Police adopted hundreds of units for use in patrol vehicles.

=== Mobile Driver's License Reader ===
L-Tron developed the mDLR-1, a standalone wireless handheld device designed to read both mobile driver's licenses (mDLs) and physical identification cards at traffic stops. The device includes a built-in camera for capturing images of license plates, street signs, and signatures, and is compatible with most eCitation software platforms. The product was developed in response to the growing adoption of digital identification by U.S. states, including Georgia, which passed legislation requiring law enforcement to accept mDLs by July 2027.

== Industry involvement ==
L-Tron has exhibited and presented at the annual International Association for Identification (IAI) Conference, the largest forensic evidence examination and crime scene processing conference in the world, since 2018. Andrew McNeill has delivered presentations at the conference including "The Big Picture: Adding Spherical Photography to your Crime Scene Training" (2021, Nashville) and "Something from Nothing: Building a Courtroom Presentation with Limited Scene Documentation" (2023).

== Recognition ==
- Digital Rochester GREAT Award for Technology Innovation (2018)
- Rochester Business Journal Best of the Web finalist (2013, 2014)
- Gayle DeRose, TechRochester Technology Woman of the Year nominee (2019)
- Gayle DeRose, Rochester Business Journal Women of Excellence Award nominee (2018)
- Inc. 5000, No. 4907 (2014)
- Rochester Top 100, No. 44 (2011), No. 19 (2014)

== COVID-19 response ==
During the COVID-19 pandemic, L-Tron contributed to local relief efforts in the Rochester area.
