= HD Pentax D FA 24-70mm F2.8 ED SDM WR =

- Maker: Ricoh
- Lens mount: Pentax KAF3

Technical data
- Type: Zoom
- Focus drive: Ultrasonic (Tamron type)
- Focal length: 24-70mm
- Aperture (max/min): f/2.8
- Close focus distance: 0.38 metres (1.2 ft)
- Max. magnification: 0.2
- Diaphragm blades: 9 rounded
- Construction: 17 elements in 12 groups

Features
- Manual focus override: Yes Yes
- Weather-sealing: Yes Yes
- Lens-based stabilization: No No
- Aperture ring: No No

Physical
- Diameter: 88.5 millimetres (3.48 in)
- Weight: 812 grams (1.790 lb) with hood
- Filter diameter: 82mm

Accessories
- Lens hood: PH-RBD82 (detachable, petal shape, plastic, included)

History
- Introduction: 2015

The HD Pentax D FA 24-70mm F2.8 ED SDM WR is an interchangeable standard zoom lens announced by Ricoh on September 24, 2015. It covers a full frame (35mm) imaging circle.
