= Don H. Liu =

American lawyer

Don H. Liu is a Korean-American lawyer and Chief Legal and Risk Officer of Target Corporation.

== Early life and education ==
Don H. Liu was born in Seoul, South Korea on 1963. His father was a mid-level city bureaucrat, and his mother was a nurse. Liu is the eldest of three children. The family moved to the United States in 1973 when he was 10 years old, after his mother got a job in a Philadelphia hospital. The first family member to learn English, Liu learned how to operate a business by helping his father on the series of businesses that he built up.

Liu earned a Bachelor of Arts in philosophy and religion from Haverford College. He received his Juris Doctor from Columbia University School of Law, where he was a Harlan Fiske Stone Scholar.

== Career ==
Beginning in 1987, Liu served as an associate in New York City for Simpson, Thacher and Bartlett, and then for Richards & O’Neil. His career working for law firms ended in 1992. Subsequently, he became Deputy Chief Legal Officer and Vice President of Aetna U.S. Healthcare. After that, he was Senior Vice President, Secretary and General Counsel for IKON Office Solutions and then as Senior Vice President, Chief Compliance Manager and General Counsel at Toll Brothers, Inc. He was later Executive Vice President, General Counsel, and Secretary for the Xerox Corporation.

Since August 22, 2016, Liu has been Executive Vice President, Corporate Secretary, and Chief Legal Officer of the Target Corporation.

== Awards and honors ==
In 2017, Liu was featured in the National Law Journal as a Target corporation board member. He received the "Roderick Palmore Pathmaker Award" in 2014 for his achievements in law and the America's Top General Counsel Honor from NYSE Euronext's Corporate Board Member". Liu has also received the 2005 Justice in Action award from the Asian American Legal Defense and Education Fund, the 2004 “Business Leadership Award” from the Korean American Coalition" and the 2004 "Asian Pacific American Lawyers Association" of New Jersey Annual Achievement Award. The Asian American Bar Association of New York created the Don H. Liu Scholars Program, Inc., a scholarship for law students in the United States. In 2024, Liu was recognized by Gold House as one of the most impactful Asians.
