= Larry Barton =

American academic

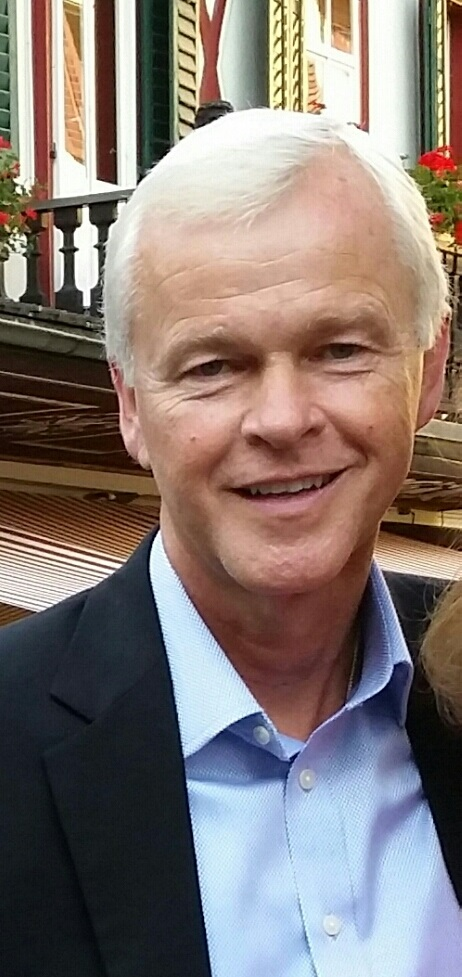
- Education: Boston College; Tufts University; Boston University; The American College
- Website: larrybarton.com

Laurence Barton more commonly known as Larry Barton is an American risk management consultant, author and professor. He served as the president of The American College from 2003 to 2013. Concurrent with his role at The American College, he is an expert guest speaker at The FBI Academy and at The U.S. Marshals Service.

Barton is considered an expert in threat assessment and workplace violence prevention and mitigation. Since 1987, he has worked as consultant with many organizations for mitigating threats in their workplace. He has written five books and has contributed chapters to several others. Since 2005, he has been on the editorial board of Journal of Contingencies and Crisis Management and, since 2007 on the Editorial Board of Violence and Gender.

== Early life and education ==
Barton graduated from Arlington Catholic High School in Massachusetts in 1974 and received his AB in Speech and Communications from Boston College in 1978. In 1979, he joined Boston College as adjunct professor of communications. While working at the Boston College, he enrolled for Master of Arts in Law and Diplomacy (M.A.L.D.) in International Business at Tufts University, completing his degree in 1981. In 1983, he received his Ph.D. from Boston University in International Relations and Public Policy. He is a Saint John Paul II Scholar as a result of graduate studies at the University of St. Thomas in Houston, TX which began in 2024.

== Career ==
Barton continued teaching at the Boston College till 1986 and joined the Harvard Business School as lecturer in Management Communication in 1987. While he was teaching at Harvard Business School, he noticed that during the market's crash, many of his students who were Wall Street executives remained stoic. Their response to the market crash, impressed Barton and he decided to study how executive teams responded to crises. Subsequently, he started focusing his research and work on crisis and threat management. He left Harvard in 1989 and joined University of Nevada, Las Vegas as associate professor of Management. He received three First Interstate Bank research grants on crisis management. After leaving UNLV in 1993, he joined Pennsylvania State University in 1994 as associate professor of Management and Organization.

In 1995, Barton joined Motorola as Vice President of Issues Management and later joined the company's semiconductor products sector where he managed regional teams in London, Geneva, Hong Kong and Tokyo. In 1999, he left Motorola to join DeVry University as the president and chief academic and business officer and served there for two years, when in 2001, he joined the Heald College as president and CEO.

Barton joined The American College in 2003 as the president and CEO. He was later endowed the O. Alfred Granum Chair at the institute. He became a frequent, highly ranked guest speaker in workplace violence prevention and crisis leadership at The FBI Academy starting in 2007 and at The US Marshals Service in 2013.

Since 1987, Barton has also worked as threat and workplace violence consultant. As a consultant he was worked with numerous companies, non-profit institutions and law enforcement agencies on issues involving threats by employees and other stakeholders of the organization. He has served on the editorial board of the Journal of Business and Economic Perspectives at the University of Tennessee since 1995 and Gender and Violence since 2013.

In January, 2017, Barton was named Distinguished Professor of Crisis Management and Public Safety at the University of Central Florida (UCF) where he leads academic and public/private partnerships on issues of concerns to corporations, law enforcement agencies and non-profit institutions. today.

In 2011, he received his Chartered Advisor in Philanthropy from The American College.

== Books and writing ==
Barton is the author of five books and has contributed chapters to several others. He wrote his first book, Crisis in Organizations in 1990. The second edition of the book, Crisis in Organizations II was published in 2000. Reviewing the book, Security Management wrote “Crisis in Organizations II covers a lot of ground, from recognizing a problem to exploring the communications aspects of crisis management. The meat of the book--the general principles that Barton covers--is well seasoned with case studies. Alan Friedman of Northwestern University Medical School wrote that "Barton's book is rare, adopted by leading colleges for classroom use, and by American Express, Nabisco, and others in training programs. It is scholarly yet practical...breathtaking in depth." Barton's third book, published in 1995, was Ethics: The Enemy in the Workplace.

In 2008, Barton wrote Crisis Leadership Now, in which he analysed more than 400 cases of violence and scandal that impacted notable companies around the world. The book was named one of the best business books for 2008 by Soundview Executive Books and has been translated in four languages.

In 2020, he authored The Violent Person @ Work, published by Anthem Press of London and New York. The book reveals seven characteristics Barton found in studying more than 3200 cases of physical assault, stalking, suicide, intimate partner violence and murders in workplaces globally. The book received high praise from several reviewers including the retired Director of the United States Secret Service, Mark Sullivan, who called the book: "...distinguished for being both compelling and practical- important for anyone who must make difficult decisions in the midst of a pending threat." In the book, Barton outlined challenges and threats in the post Covid-19 workplace as employees adjust to new standards that can elevate stress and anxiety.

Barton was the subject advisor for Crisis Management: The Essentials from Harvard Business School Books, and Risk Communications and Public Health from Oxford University Press. His articles have appeared in The New York Times, The Boston Globe, USA Today, and numerous academic journals. Barton is the author of numerous articles on work place violence that have appeared in The FBI-LEEDA Magazine.

== Bibliography ==
- Crisis in Organizations: Managing and Communicating in the Heat of Chaos. (1991). ISBN 978-0538818186
- Ethics: The Enemy in the Workplace. (1994). ISBN 978-0538838733
- Crisis in Organizations II. (2000). ISBN 978-0324024296
- Crisis Leadership Now: A Real-World Guide to Preparing for Threats, Disaster, Sabotage, and Scandal. (2008). ISBN 978-0071498821
- The Violent Person @ Work (2020). ISBN 978-1-78527-272-1

== Awards and honors ==
- Fulbright Senior Scholar to Japan, 1994
- Academy of Achievement, 1974. Youth Achievement Award. (achievement.org)
- Ascendant Scholar by the Western Academy of Management, 1993
- Named “One Of The 100 Most Powerful People In the Insurance Industry” by Insurance Newscast, annually 2004-2013.
- Lifetime Achievement Award, The Roundtable of New York, 2011
- Director’s Award for Achievement in Public Safety, Federal Bureau of Investigation, 2010, 2021
- Lifetime Achievement Award in Education, Israel Bonds, 2014
- The Huebner Gold Medal, lifetime achievement from The American College, 2014
- Distinguished Service Award, The International Management Security Association (ISMA), 2018.
- Lifetime Achievement Award/Induction, Security of Fame, OSPAs/ASIS, 2024. https://us.theospas.com/2024/09/22/2024-us-ospa-winners-revealed/
