= Political ReviewNet =

Political ReviewNet is an online database of book reviews from academic journals in the field of international relations and political sciences.

== Academic journals that participate ==
- Australian Journal of Politics & History.
- Australian Journal of Public Administration (IPAA).
- Constellations.
- Diplomatic History (SHAFA).
- International Affairs (RIIA).
- International Studies Review (ISA).
- Journal of Common Market Studies (UACES).
- Journal of Contingencies and Crisis Management.
- Journal of Politics (SPSA).
- Middle East Policy.
- Nations and Nationalism.
- Peace and Change.
- Political Quarterly.
- Political Studies (PSA).
- Public Administration Review (ASPA).
- Governance and Public Administration.
