= Ricoh WG-30 =

Overview
- Maker: Ricoh

Lens
- Lens: 28-140mm equivalent
- F-numbers: f/3.5-f/5.5 at the widest

Sensor/medium
- Sensor type: BSI-CMOS
- Sensor size: 6.17 x 4.55mm (1/2.3 inch type)
- Maximum resolution: 4608 x 3456 (16 megapixels)
- Film speed: 125-6400
- Recording medium: SD, SDHC or SDXC memory card

Focusing
- Focus areas: 9 focus points

Shutter
- Shutter speeds: 1/4000s to 4s

Image processing
- White balance: Yes

General
- LCD screen: 2.7 inches with 230,000 dots
- Dimensions: 123 x 62 x 30mm (4.84 x 2.44 x 1.18 inches)
- Weight: 192g including battery

The Ricoh WG-30 is a rugged, waterproof digital compact camera announced by Ricoh on October 8, 2014. It is the successor of the Ricoh WG-20. The main advance is the backside-illuminated sensor that also increases resolution from 14 to 16 megapixels compared to the previous model. The rugged metrics have also increased, with now 40 feet rather than 33 feet of underwater depth tolerance advertised. As in the previous model, the WG-30 is shockproof to 1.5m (5ft), crushproof to 100kg (220lb) of force, and coldproof to -10 degrees Celsius (14 degrees Fahrenheit).

As of October 2014, the WG-30 is not available in the US, instead the WG-30W variant is sold there. It is expected to start shipping there in mid-December, with the WG-30 released in the UK in November.

The Ricoh WG-30W, in contrast to the WG-30, includes a Wi-Fi chip that allows the camera to be controlled wirelessly through a dedicated smartphone app.
