= Olympus AZ-4 zoom =

35mm SLR camera with fixed lens

The Olympus AZ-4 Zoom is a 35mm fixed-lens SLR camera introduced in 1989.

== Overview ==
The camera is almost identical to the Ricoh Mirai, except it does not have a remote control socket and uses different batteries. It was one of the earliest examples of a superzoom lens, with an ability to zoom from 35 to 135mm. The zoom lens moves slowly compared to modern 35mm cameras, and the autofocus is slower and less reliable. However, the images it can achieve are of a very high standard particularly in terms of sharpness.

It has the following features usually only found on SLR cameras:

- Real image viewfinder
- Manual focusing mode
- Exposure adjustment
- Shutter speed adjustment
- Hotshoe for external flash

It has the following features usually only found on compact cameras:

- Autofocus
- Built in pop up flash
- Self timer (Timer to take photo 10 seconds after shutter is pressed)
- Fill-in flash

It also has the following features

- LCD
- Beeps when autofocus locks
- Tripod socket

Some models use 2 123 size lithium batteries. The version marketed by Ricoh can accept a large lithium battery or four AAA size batteries. There is also a Quartz date model, and the back on a regular model can be removed and replaced with a data back.

== Trivia ==
The camera appeared in the 1989 Batman film.
