= Savin Corporation =

US company

- Type: Subsidiary
- Industry: Electronics, Imaging
- Founded: 1959
- Headquarters: Chūō, Tokyo, Japan
- Area served: Worldwide
- Key people: Masamitsu Sakurai Chairman, Shiro Kondo President & CEO
- Products: Photocopiers, printers, and fax machines
- Revenue: 2,016 billion Yen (Fiscal year ended March 31, 2010)
- Number of employees: 108,525 (on consolidated basis, as of March 31, 2010)
- Parent: Ricoh
- Website: www.ricoh.com

Savin Corporation was an American office equipment manufacturer independently active from 1959 to 1995. The company was founded in the United States in 1959 by Max M. and Robert K. Low, named after Max Low's son-in-law, Robert S. Savin. The firm was run by Low's son, Robert K. Low (finance, management and marketing) and E. Paul Charlap (research and development).

Savin Corporation was once a prominent name in the copier industry, especially known for providing economical copier solutions to educational institutions. Despite competing with major corporations such as Konica, Xerox, IBM, and Kodak, Savin successfully established its market share through focused marketing strategies and affordable products.

During the 1960s and through the 1980s, Savin developed and sold a line of black-and-white liquid-toner copiers that implemented the technology that was based on patents held by the company. These copiers easily competed with Powder based technology with their far superior fine line resolution once the era of early Electrostatic transfer was done and the liquid was charged in the machine. The reservoir, called a Tank, had to be cleaned and fluid changed at the regular maintenance. Savin Developed very deep Tanks and spring mounts for these copiers used on Naval Vessels. One version was the Savin 772. Shore based service and parts was provided by Savin dealers local to many US Ports. In the later 1980's Savin invented a much darker ink called Landa to compete with the improving Powder Copiers. Savin's copiers were manufactured by Ricoh Company and distributed by Savin in the US and Canada through 50 branch offices and 500 dealers, and under licenses from Savin to Nashua for Europe and South America, and through Ricoh for the Far East.

Savin was able to develop its niche of economy-grade copiers through its persistent marketing efforts, which targeted educational institutions. Savin had sales of approximately $500 million (along with royalties from licensees of $10 million), and was listed on the New York Stock Exchange.

In 1982, it was bought by Canadian Development Corporation, and then acquired by another firm which promptly discontinued the marketing. This led to a steep decline in revenue from both sales and royalties. In the early 1990s Savin Phased out liquid copiers and entered the low cost powder copier business. Most of Savin copier business was machines that made under 50 copies per minute, where it held dominant low price points.

In 1995, Ricoh Company acquired Savin Corporation. This resulted in all Savin machines being rebadged Ricoh machines, which use dry toner. From that point onward, all Savin-branded machines were actually Ricoh machines rebadged with the Savin label, using Ricoh’s technology and toner systems. Product design, development, manufacturing, sales, and service have since been fully integrated into Ricoh’s global operations.

As of today, Savin does not exist as an independent brand or company. All operations related to Savin machines—including sales, support, supplies, and service—are fully handled by Ricoh Company and its authorized distributors. Any remaining Savin-branded products in the market are, in fact, Ricoh-manufactured devices, supported and managed by Ricoh’s official distributor network.
