= Nikkorex =

Series of 35mm single-lens reflex cameras

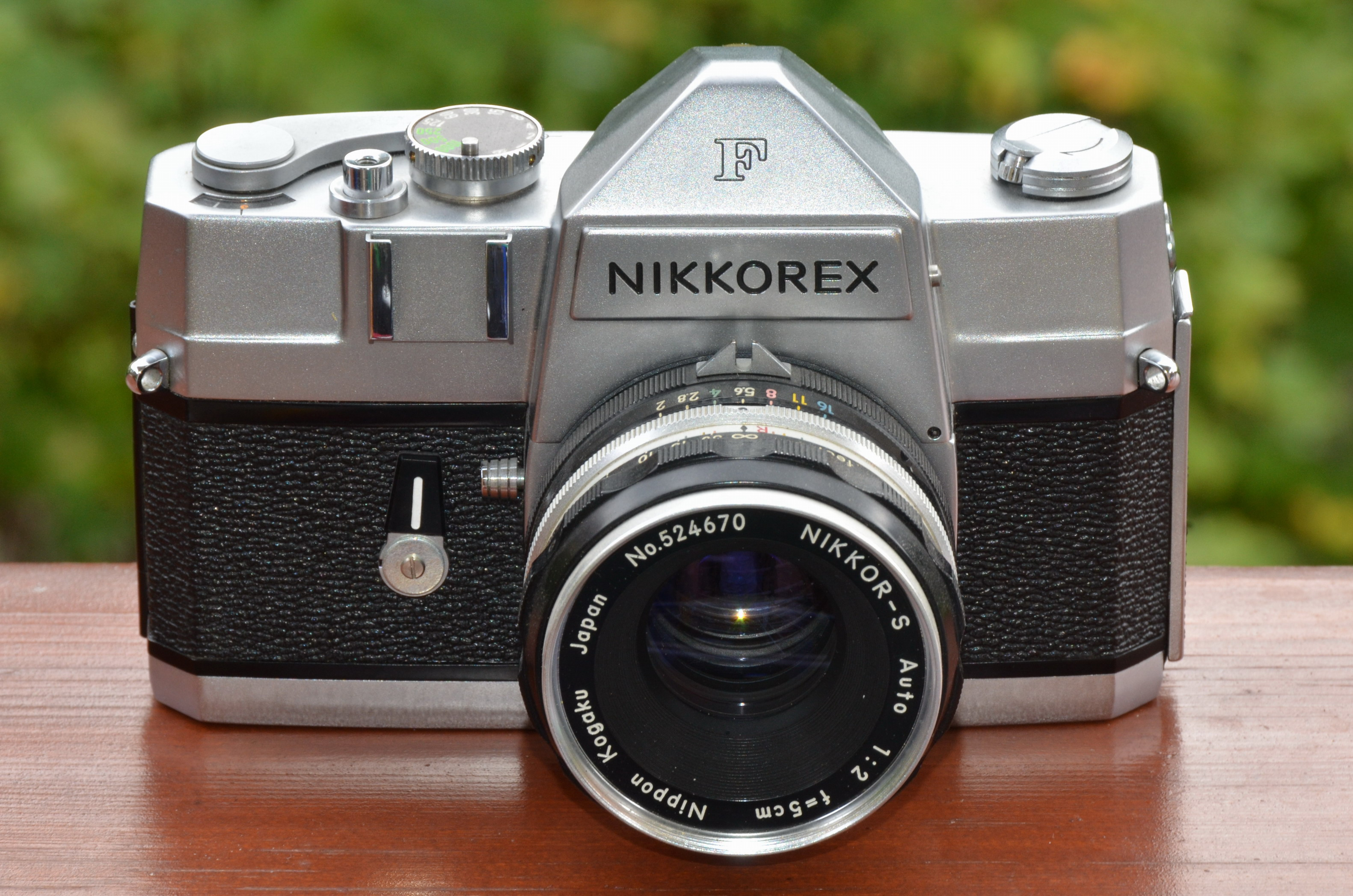
Nikkorex F with NIKKOR-S Auto 1:2 f=5cm lens

The Nikkorex nameplate was used for a series of 35 mm film, single-lens reflex cameras sold by Japanese optical manufacturer Nippon Kogaku K. K. (now Nikon Corporation), as well as a series movie cameras and movie projectors. The models, made by other companies, were designed and marketed as low-cost, feature-reduced equipment for the consumer market.

== Still camera models ==
=== Nikkorex 35 ===
The Nikkorex 35 was the first model of the Nikkorex series, produced in 1960. To keep costs low compared to the flagship Nikon F, the Nikkorex 35 used a fixed four-element Nikkor-Q 5 cm f/2.5 lens instead of an interchangeable F-mount; a Citizen MVL leaf shutter instead of a Leica-inspired focal plane shutter; a fixed, mirror-based viewfinder and fixed focusing screen instead of a glass pentaprism; no instant-return mirror mechanism or mirror lock-up option; no provision for motor drives; and lesser build quality.

Built-in metering — a first for a Nikon camera — used a selenium cell above the lens. Controls for meter-coupled aperture, shutter speed and film speed settings are on rings around the lens.

Optional attachments via the filter ring were available to convert the lens into a 3.5 cm/5.6 or 9 cm/5.6 lens.

=== Nikkorex 35 II ===
The Nikkorex 35 II introduced in 1962, was a revision of the Nikkorex. The Citizen shutter was replaced with a more reliable Seikosha SLV shutter assembly, and the corners of the body were rounded to give a more comfortable grip. The name "NIKKOREX" was also printed on the front of the meter lens.

=== Nikkorex F / Nikkor J ===
The Nikkorex F, introduced in 1962, was the second interchangeable-lens SLR sold by Nikon, but it was manufactured by Mamiya.

Along with dropping the leaf shutter design of the other Nikkorex products, the Nikkorex F was the first production camera to use the Copal Square shutter, a rugged design used in many future cameras by Nikon and other manufacturers. The shutter also offered a faster flash sync speed of 1/125th of a second compared to the Nikon F. Along with a different shutter, the Nikkorex F used a hinged back for more convenient film loading.

In 1965, the first of the Nikkormat series was introduced, a Nikon-built amateur market camera using a Copal Square shutter. The Nikkorex F was discontinued in 1966, and Mamiya sold the design to Ricoh, which produced the related Ricoh Singlex and Sears SL11.

The same camera was also exported, with the name Nikkor J on the body, to Germany.

=== Nikkorex ZOOM 35 ===
The Nikkorex Zoom 35 was a variation on the Nikkorex 35 II. Released in 1963, the Zoom 35 shares the Nikkorex 35 II's distinctive nameplate mounted to a black selenium cell meter. Instead of a 50mm lens, the Nikkorex Zoom 35 has a fixed 43-86mm f/3.5 lens that is a predecessor to the Nikkor F-mount 43-86mm lens released later in 1963. Like the earlier fix-lens Nikkorex models, virtually all control of the camera was done using rings on the lens. Shutter speed, aperture, film ASA (ISO) number, zoom and focus each had a control ring on the lens, while only the shutter release and film wind were on the camera body.

=== Nikkorex Auto 35 ===
The Nikkorex Auto 35 was a new design replacing the Nikkorex 35 II. The camera body was redesigned with curved surfaces, the shutter release button on the front on the body rather than the top and the film advance on the back of the camera. New features included a 48mm f/2.0 Nikkor lens, a new instant return mirror design, improved pentaprism viewfinder and a shutter priority auto-exposure mode.

== Movie cameras and projectors ==
Nikon offered a series of movie cameras and projectors using the Nikkorex name from 1960 to 1965.

| Class | 1950s | | | | | 1960s | | | | | | | | | | 1970s | | | | | | | | | | 1980s | | | | | | | | | | 1990s | | | | | | | | | | 2000s | | | | | | | | | | 2020s | | | |
| Class | 55 | 56 | 57 | 58 | 59 | 60 | 61 | 62 | 63 | 64 | 65 | 66 | 67 | 68 | 69 | 70 | 71 | 72 | 73 | 74 | 75 | 76 | 77 | 78 | 79 | 80 | 81 | 82 | 83 | 84 | 85 | 86 | 87 | 88 | 89 | 90 | 91 | 92 | 93 | 94 | 95 | 96 | 97 | 98 | 99 | 00 | 01 | 02 | 03 | 04 | 05 | 06 | 07 | 08 | 09 | ... | 20 | 21 | 22 |
| Professional | | | | | F | | | | | | | | | | | | | | | | | | | | | F3 | | | | | | | | | | | | | | | | | | | | | | | | | | | | | | | | | |
| Professional | | | | | | | | | | | | | | | | | F2 | | | | | | | | | | | | F3AF | | | | | F4 | | | | | | | | F5 | | | | | | | | F6 | | | | | | | | | |
| High-end | | | | | | | | | | | | | | | | | | | | | | | | | | | | | FA | | | | | F-801 (N8008)/ F-801s (N8008s) | | | | F90 (N90) | | F90X (N90s) | | | | | F100 | | | | | | | | | | | | | | |
| Mid-range | | | | | | | | | | | | | | | | | | | | | | | | | | | | | | | | F-501 (N2020) | | | | F-601 (N6006) | | | | F70 (N70) | | | | | | F80 (N80) | | | | | | | | | | | | | |
| Mid-range | | | | | | | | | | | | | | | | | | EL / EL2 /ELW | | | | | | FE | | | | | FE2 | | | | | | | F-601M (N6000) | | | | F70 (N70) | | | | | | F80 (N80) | | | | | | | | | | | | | |
| Mid-range | | | | | | | | | | | FT | | FTn/ FT2/ FT3 | | | | | | | | | | FM | | | | | FM2/FM2n | | | | | | | | | | | | | | | | | | | FM3A | | | | | | | | | | | | |
| Mid-range | | | | | | | | | | | FS | | | | | | | | | | | | FM | | | | | FM2/FM2n | | | | | | | | | | | | | | | | | | | FM3A | | | | | | | | | | | | |
| Entry-level | | | | | | | | | | | | | | | | | | | | | | | | | | | | | | | | | | | | | | | | | | | | | | | | | | | | | | | | | | | |
| Entry-level | | | | | | | | | | | | | | | | | | | | | | | | | | | | | | | | | | | | | | | | | | Pronea S | | | | | | | | | | | | | | | | | |
| Entry-level | | | | | | | | | | | | | | | | | | | | | | | | | | | | | | | | | | | | | | | | | Pronea 600i/6i | | | | | | | | | | | | | | | | | | |
| Entry-level | | | | | | | | Nikkorex F / Nikkor J | | | | | | | | | | | | | | | | | EM | | | FG | | | F-301 (N2000) | | | | F-401s (N4004s) | | | | | F50 (N50) | | | | | | | F65 (N65 / U) | | F75 (N75 / U2) | | | | | | | | | | |
| Entry-level | | | | | | 35 | | 35 II | | Auto 35 | | | | | | | | | | | | | | | | | | | | FG-20 | | | F-401 (N4004) | | | | F-401x (N5005) | | | | | | | | F60 (N60) | | | F55 (N55) | | | | | | | | | | | |
| Entry-level | | | | | | | | | Zoom 35 | | | | | | | | | | | | | | | | | | | | | | | | | | | | | | | | FM10 / FE10 | | | | | | | | | | | | | | | | | | |
| Class | 55 | 56 | 57 | 58 | 59 | 60 | 61 | 62 | 63 | 64 | 65 | 66 | 67 | 68 | 69 | 70 | 71 | 72 | 73 | 74 | 75 | 76 | 77 | 78 | 79 | 80 | 81 | 82 | 83 | 84 | 85 | 86 | 87 | 88 | 89 | 90 | 91 | 92 | 93 | 94 | 95 | 96 | 97 | 98 | 99 | 00 | 01 | 02 | 03 | 04 | 05 | 06 | 07 | 08 | 09 | ... | 20 | 21 | 22 |
| Class | 1950s | | | | | 1960s | | | | | | | | | | 1970s | | | | | | | | | | 1980s | | | | | | | | | | 1990s | | | | | | | | | | 2000s | | | | | | | | | | 2020s | | | |
