= Ikon Office Solutions =

American company, purchased by Ricoh

IKON Office Solutions, Inc.
- Company type: Subsidiary
- Industry: Copier and Document Services
- Founded: 1952
- Headquarters: Malvern, Pennsylvania, United States
- Services: Document Services
- Revenue: $4.2 bil (2007)
- Number of employees: 20,000
- Parent: Ricoh
- Website: no longer in existence

IKON Office Solutions was a company based in Malvern, Pennsylvania. It was the world's largest independent provider of document management systems, copiers and services until it was purchased by manufacturer Ricoh in 2008. IKON uses copiers, printers and multifunction printer technologies from leading manufacturers and document management software and systems from companies like Captaris, Kofax, and EFI.

On August 27, 2008 IKON agreed to be purchased by copier manufacturer Ricoh for $1.62 billion. The company has been a registered Pennsylvania corporation since 1956.
