= Ricoh XR-P =

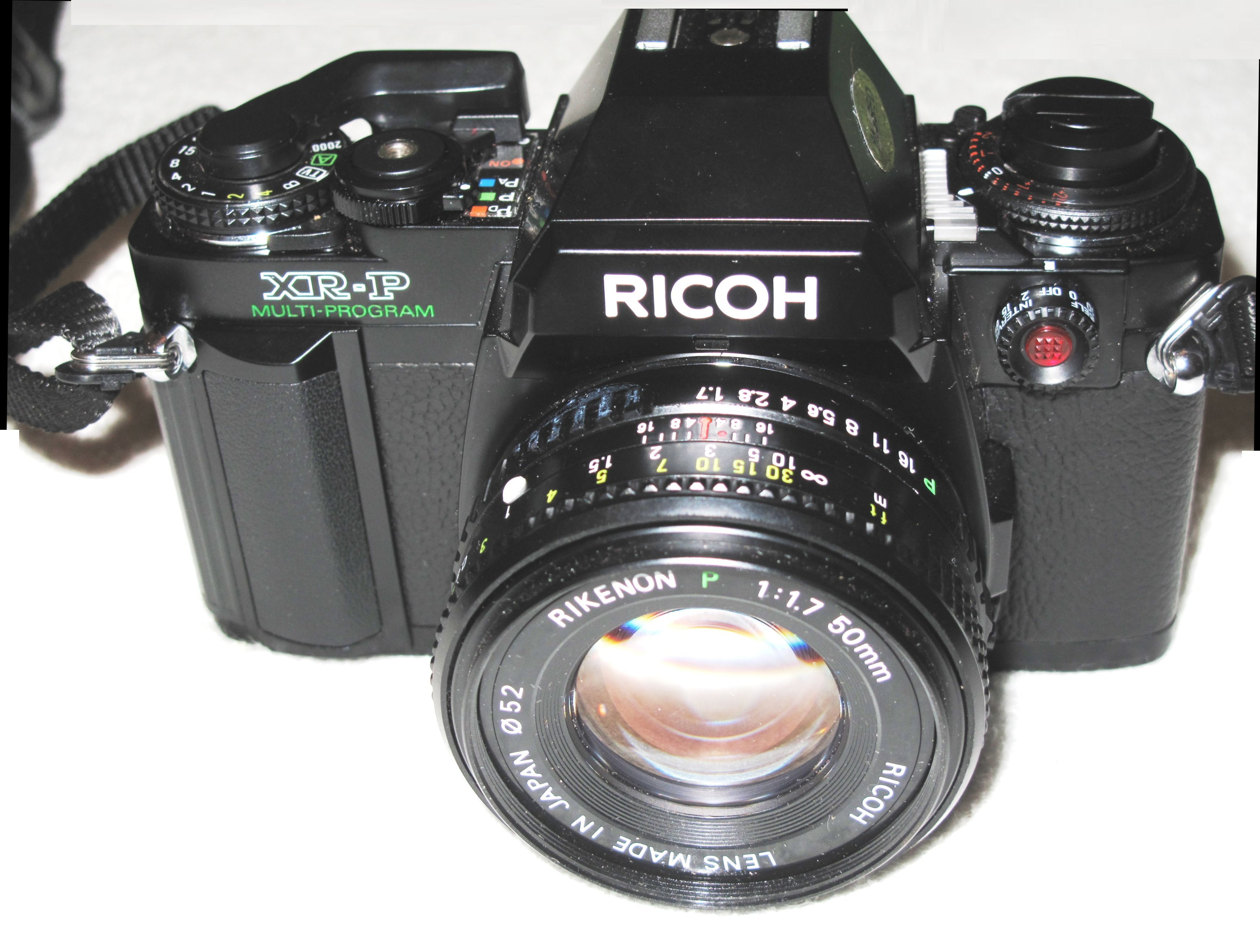
- A chrome Ricoh XR-P

Overview
- Maker: Ricoh
- Type: 35 mm SLR
- Released: July 1984
- Production: 1984-?

Lens
- Lens mount: Ricoh System RK mount

Sensor/medium
- Film format: 35mm
- Film size: 36 mm x 24 mm

Focusing
- Focus: Manual focus

Exposure/metering
- Exposure: Aperture priority; program; manual

Flash
- Flash: Hot shoe and PC terminal

General
- Dimensions: 51×86×136 mm (2.0×3.4×5.4 in), 505g
- Made in: Japan

The Ricoh XR-P (also XR-P Multi-Program) is a 35mm Single Lens Reflex (SLR) camera manufactured by Ricoh from 1984.

== Specifications ==
The XR-P's lens system is the Ricoh System RK mount. Shutter speed ranges from 16 seconds to 1/2000 seconds plus B and TV. It has a self-timer of 10 seconds (zero seconds for left-hand shutter operation), and an interval timer of 2 seconds, 15 seconds, or 60 seconds. The viewfinder's field of view covers 93%, magnification at .88X with 50mm, F1.4 standard lens. Viewfinder display includes Exposure adjustment, AE lock, manual, program mode, TV mode, overexposure and under exposure marks, shutter speed indicator, battery low warning, and programmed F-stop.
