= Ricoh WG-M1 =

Overview
- Maker: Ricoh
- F-numbers: f/2.8 at the widest

Sensor/medium
- Sensor type: CMOS
- Sensor size: 6.17 x 4.55mm (1/2.3 inch type)
- Maximum resolution: 4320 x 3240 (14 megapixels)
- Film speed: 100-800
- Recording medium: microSD or microSDHC memory card

Image processing
- White balance: No

General
- LCD screen: 1.5 inches with 115,000 dots
- Dimensions: 66 x 43 x 89mm (2.6 x 1.69 x 3.5 inches)
- Weight: 190g including battery

The Ricoh WG-M1 is a rugged digital compact camera announced by Ricoh on September 10, 2014. It features 120fps high speed videography as well as full HD capture at 30p with electronic image stabilisation. It is waterproof to a depth of 10 meters and shockproof to drops from up to 2 meters. It includes WiFi and is can be remote-operated using a smart phone. Ricoh claims that underwater sounds can be captured without muffling. In 2015, the WG-M1 won the TIPA Award in the category Best Actioncam.
