= Ricoh Caplio G3 =

Digital camera model

Ricoh Caplio G3 is a digital camera marketed to the public under the Ricoh brand. It has a 1.6in LCD at the back of the camera. According to Ricoh it had the fastest short release reaction time of 0.14 seconds.

It stores up to 3.24 megapixels with three resolutions ranging from 2048 x 1536 to 640 x 480. It can record .avi movies and .wav eight second long voice messages attached to each photo.

It has an internal 8MB memory chip, takes Secure Digital and MultiMediaCard, and can connect to a PC via USB, or a TV using the NTSC/PAL output.
