= Ricoh Caplio 500SE =

Overview
- Maker: Ricoh
- Type: Point-and-shoot

Lens
- Lens: 28(24) - 85mm

Sensor/medium
- Sensor: 1/1.8″ CCD (8.13 Megapixels)
- Maximum resolution: 3264 × 2448
- Film speed: ISO 64 - ISO 1600
- Storage media: SD/MMC card

Flash
- Flash: Internal (Range: 10m)

Viewfinder
- Viewfinder: Internal

General
- LCD screen: 2.5″ TFT LCD, 230,000 pixels
- Battery: Rechargeable battery (DB-43) × 1, AA battery × 2, AC adaptor (AC-4d)
- Weight: 430 g (15 oz) (with batteries and strap)

The Ricoh 500SE digital compact camera is suitable for outdoor photography and networkability. Capability includes external information such as GPS position or barcode numbers within the image headers. External vendors sell hardware and software for workflows involving GPS positioning or barcode scanning. Most NMEA compliant Bluetooth GPS receivers can be used with this camera through its built in Bluetooth communication capability. The body is resistant to dust and water, making it robust for many environments.

== Features ==
- 8.1 Megapixel CCD
- 28(24) - 85 mm
- USB 2.0, Bluetooth and W-Lan connection
- Shock-/Water-/Dust-resistant
- Text memos

== Specifications ==
- Camera-Type digital compact camera
- Resolution 8.1 Megapixel
- Sensor CCD
- GPS (optional)
- Compass (optional)
- Waterproof
- Text-Memos
- Sensor size 1/1,8"
- Display 2.5"
- ISO ISO 64 - ISO 1600
- Image format JPEG
- Focal length 28(24) - 85 mm
- Memory SD, MMC
- Connectivity USB 2.0, WLAN (optional), Bluetooth (optional)
- Video yes
- Weight 430g

== Models ==
=== Ricoh Caplio 500SE — GPS and compass ===
The 500SE GPS-Camera is available with integrated GPS device and integrated digital compass. Besides the coordinates, the camera can capture the direction from which the photo is taken. External software can place the photos on digital maps, Geographical Information Systems or Google Earth.

The camera can store all relevant information of the capture in one file, producing a geocoded photograph. Adding text-memos allows organizing the pictures not only by location and time, but also by name, before uploading.

==== Special features ====
- GPS (accuracy of 6–30 ft)
- Compass

==== Google Earth integration ====
As with other geocoded photographs, Google Earth can read the GPS-Information from the Exif header of the images and display pictures at the position they were taken. Even GPS-Tracks can be displayed, showing the route on which the pictures were taken.

==== GIS integration ====
The pictures can also be used in combination with GIS users. This might be the most common use of the Ricoh Caplio 500SE with GPS and Compass. Application include fields of object and status quo documentation. Geotagged photos including the direction in which the photo was taken can be useful:

- Tourism (Touristic Sights, Landscapes & Impressions, Hotels & Restaurants, Route Documentation, Signs, Touristic Offers...)
- Real Estate (Outside Views, Location, Surrounding, Highway Connection...)
- Traffic (Signs, Road Construction Site Inventory, Hazards, Accidents, Road Damages...)
- Environment Management (Environmental Inventories, Biodiversity Mapping, Tree Register, Status Quo Documentation...)
- Regulatory Agency(Graffiti, Vandalism...)
- Disaster Management (Status Quo, Road Ways to approach, Resources, Potential Threat...)

=== Ricoh Caplio 500SE — Barcode scanner ===
Since 2008, the RICOH Caplio 500SE is available with an integrated barcode scanner. It is commonly used in transport and logistic industries to identify and capture condition and integrity of goods and containers through their barcodes. The camera automatically writes the scanned barcode information into the Exif header of the photo. If you wish you can show the barcode information as an imprint in the photo. The Ricoh 500SE-W can connect your camera through its W-LAN connection directly with servers and so sent the photos from where you are.

==== Supported barcode ====
Barcode type	Example image
Code 39	
Code 128	
Interleaved 2 of 5	
ITF-14	
JAN13	–
JAN8	–
UPC-A	
UPC-E	

== External devices ==
The camera is Bluetooth enabled and able to communicate with diverse Bluetooth GPS-devices.

=== External GPS receiver ===
Several GPS receivers are compatible with the RICOH Caplio 500SE. These devices deliver different accuracies, belong to various price levels and are available from different distributors.

==== Non-differential GPS devices ====
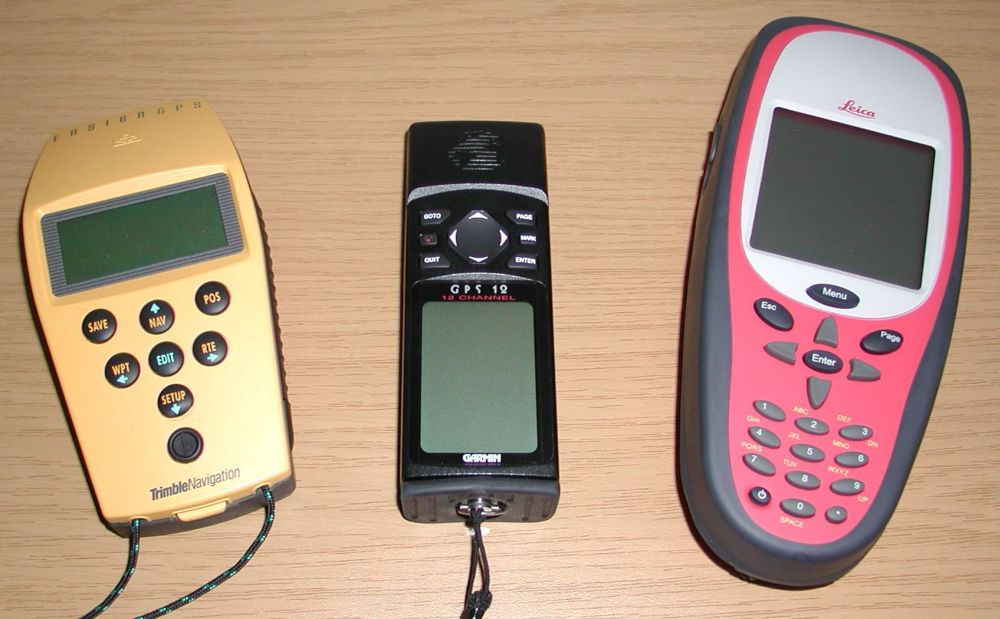
External GPS-Receivers

Non-differential GPS devices have a significantly lower price than differential ones and deliver an accuracy of 2 to 10 m. They are used in car navigation devices and outdoor GPS receivers like the Garmin eTrex or the Fortuna Slim GPS. The precondition for any connection to the GPS device is that the GPS device is capable of sending NMEA data via Bluetooth and that it takes the slave role in the communication process with the camera. The camera will always take the master role.

Recommended is the Fortuna Slim GPS. It uses a SiRFIII chip and therefore provides a reception quality. It is also very small (1/3 the size of a cigarette box) and fits in any pocket.

==== Professional GPS devices ====
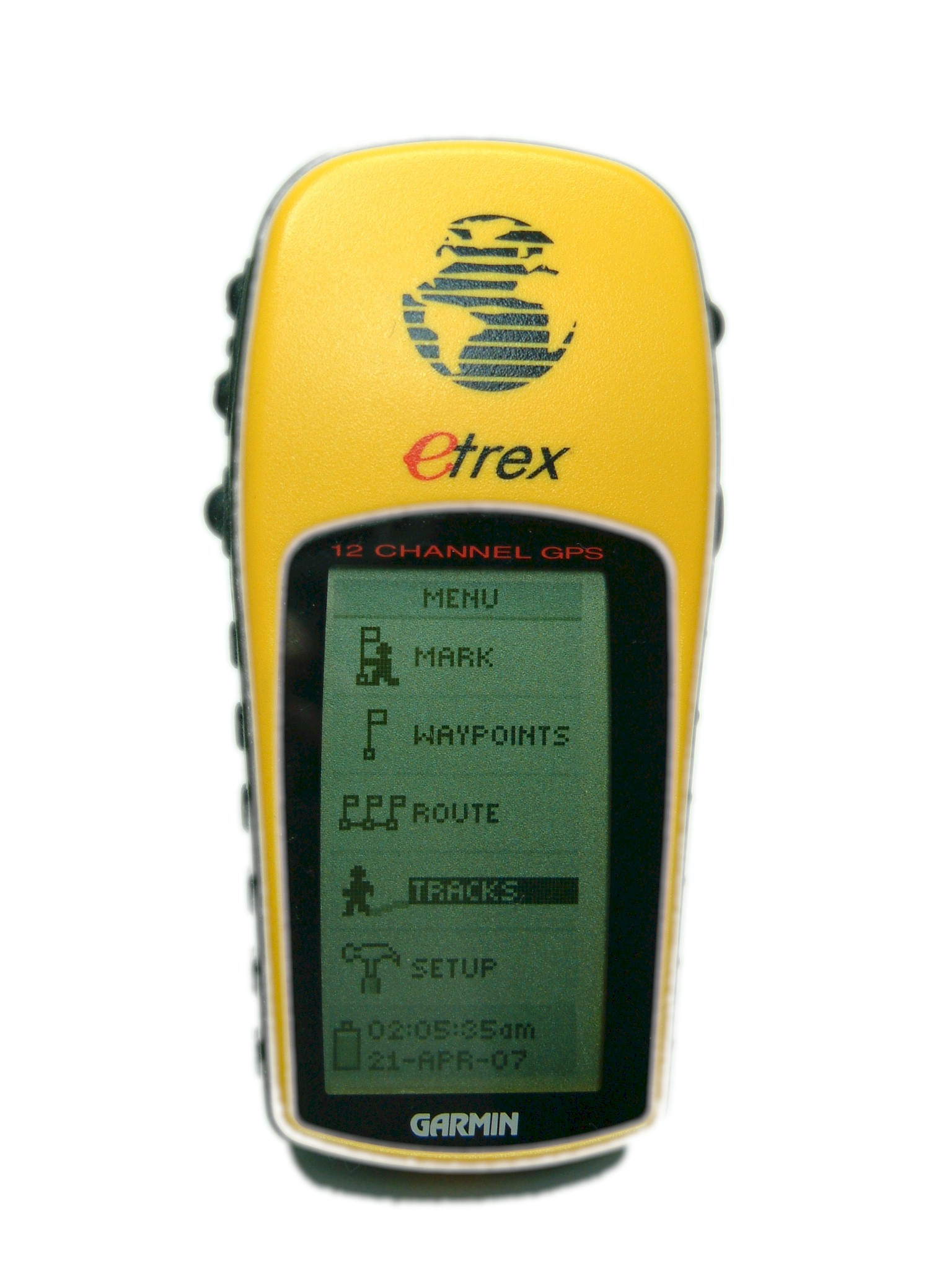
Professional External GPS-Receivers

Professional, differential GPS devices come from the surveying sector and are significantly more expensive than non-differential ones. Due to additional correction signals they can reach accuracies in the range of centimeters. The same Bluetooth preconditions apply as with non differential receivers.

The mobile, Bluetooth enabled GPS device MobileMapper CE from Thales provides submeter GPS positions. Because of the open platform of MicrosoftWindows CE.NET MobileMapper CE supports any standard GIS application on CE basis. Equally successfully tested were Bluetooth enabled devices from Trimble Navigation. The handheld Trimble GeoXH and the GPS receiver GPS Pathfinder ProXH deliver GPS coordinates in submeter range.

== See also ==
- Ricoh
- Geographic information system (GIS)
- GPS Timing
- GIS applications
- Geocoded photograph
- Geocoding on Commons
- Geotagging
