= Ricoh CX1 =

2009 digital compact camera

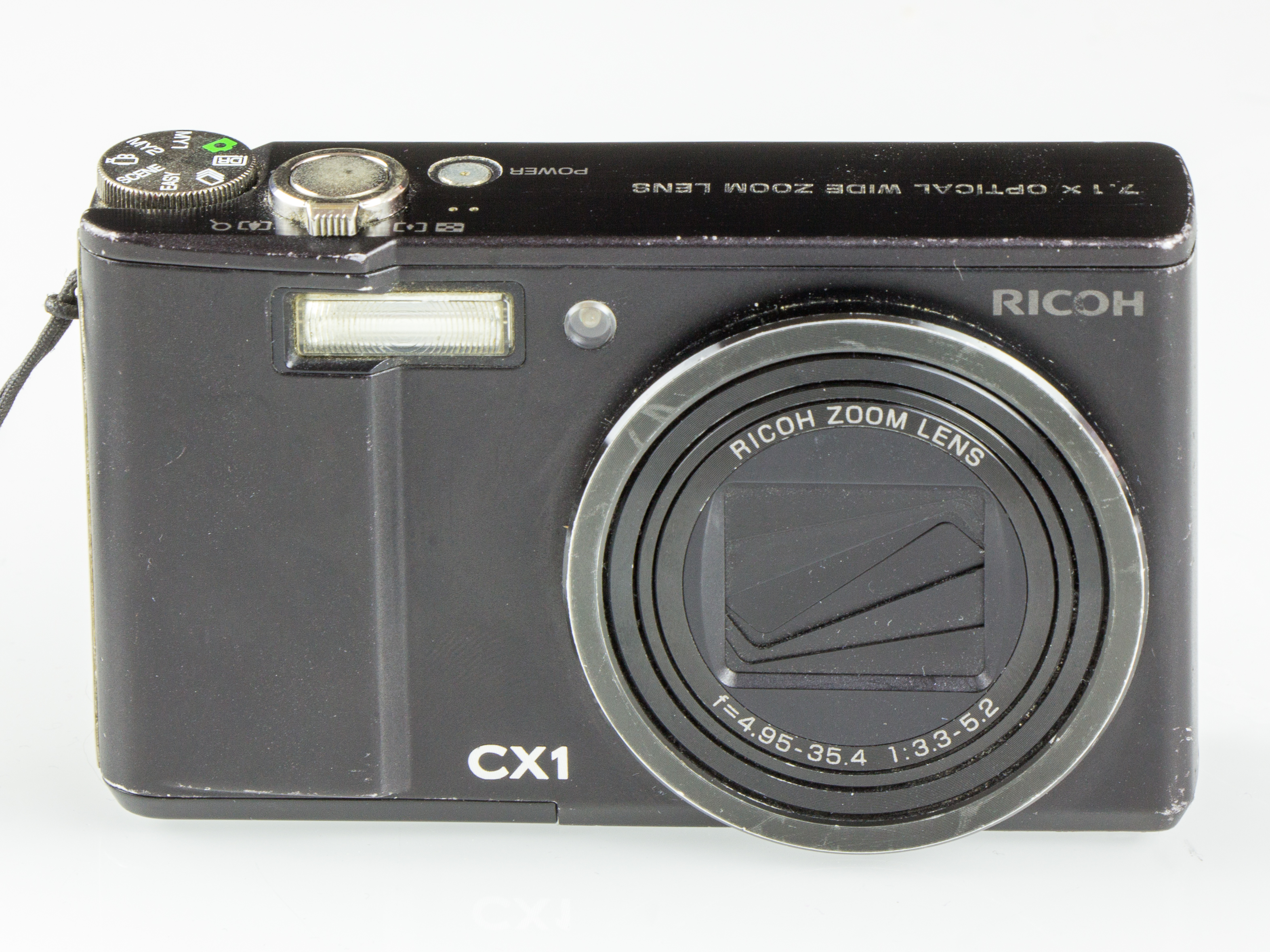
Ricoh CX1

The Ricoh CX1 has been introduced by Ricoh in 2009. This is the first Ricoh camera to use a CMOS sensor. It allows it to operate at four frames/sec and perform hi-speed continuous shooting.

== Major specifications ==
- Type: Digital compact camera
- Sensor: 1/2.3-inch CMOS (total pixels: approx. 10.29 million pixels).
  - Effective pixels: approximately 9.29 million pixels.
  - Light sensitivity: up to ISO 1600
- Lens: 7.1x zoom f=4.95-35.4 mm (like 28-200mm for 35mm film)
  - Macro: 1 cm
  - Lens Construction: 10 elements in 7 groups (aspheric lens: 4 elements and 5 surfaces)
  - Aperture: F3.3 (Wide) - F5.2 (Telephoto)
- Shooting aid: Image sensor shift method image stabilizer
- Shutter Speed: 8, 4, 2, 1 - 1/2000 sec.
- Interval timer Shooting interval: 5 seconds to 2 hours (no limit to the number of pictures you can take or their resolution)
- Display: 3.0-inch Transparent LCD (approx. 920,000 dots)
- Flash: built-in automatic electronic flash
- Dimensions: 101.5 mm (W) x 58.3 mm (H) x 27.9 mm (D) (excluding projecting parts)
- Weight: Approx. 180 g (excluding battery, SD memory card, strap), Accessories approx. 23 g (battery, strap)

== Reception ==
The Ricoh CX1 received a mainly favourable reception from independent reviewers.

Best4Reviews.com said that the CX1 was

"a highly specified, well crafted camera with a host of very clever features that really work. The Ricoh CX1 is however a machine for the more advanced user and offers image quality to match, for those that know what they’re doing."

IT Reviews concluded that:

"Ricoh has managed to pack a lot under the stylish hood of the CX1, including some welcome new features like very high-speed continuous shooting and increased dynamic range, plus multi-targeting AF and WB."
