= Ricoh Theta =

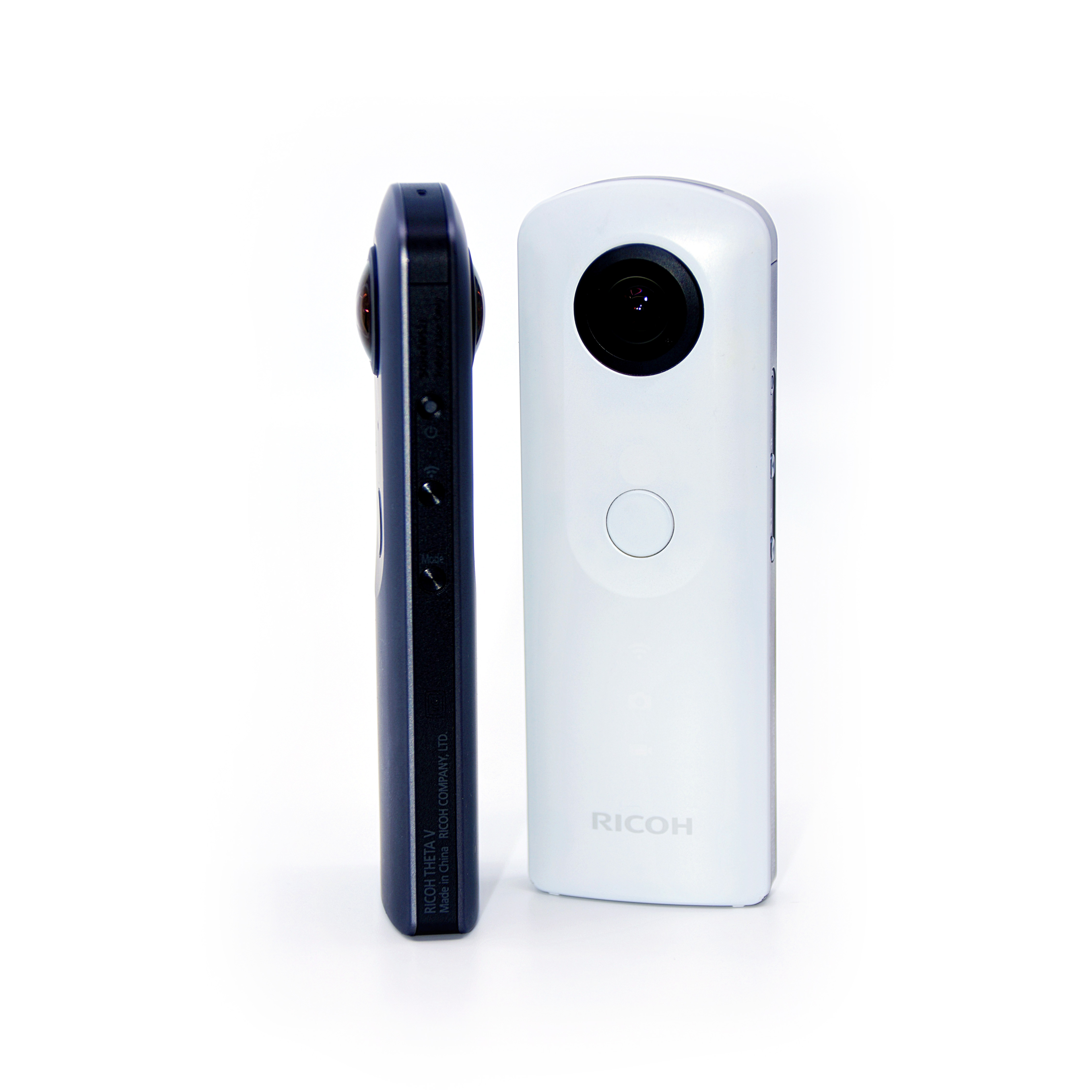
Ricoh Theta V (left) and Ricoh Theta SC (right)

Ricoh Theta is a line of 360-degree cameras by Japanese manufacturer Ricoh.

All of the cameras are capable of 360-degree video and photos, with the exception of the original Ricoh Theta which can only take photos. Also, they all feature Bluetooth, Wi-Fi and USB connectivity, and are designed to work alongside a smartphone, enabling for live preview and uploading of the captured media.

== Cameras ==
The lineup includes the following cameras:

- Ricoh Theta M15: 4 GB memory. Capable of full HD video at 15 FPS, with a maximum clip duration of 5 minutes. Available in 4 colors.
- Ricoh Theta S: 8 GB memory. Capable of full-HD video at 30 FPS, with a maximum duration of 25 minutes. Maximum exposure time of 60 seconds.
- Ricoh Theta SC: 8 GB internal memory. Capable of full-HD video at 30 FPS, with a maximum clip duration of 5 minutes. Available in 4 colors.
- Ricoh Theta SC2: 14 GB internal memory. Capable of 4K video at 30 FPS, with a maximum clip duration of 3 minutes. Available in 4 colors.
- Ricoh Theta V: 19 GB internal memory. Capable of 4K video at 30 FPS. HDR shooting capability. Four-channel microphone.
- Ricoh Theta Z1: The top-of-the-line model as of September 2019, (and remains so as-of July 2024). 19 GB internal memory. Capable of 4K video at 30 FPS. HDR and RAW shooting capability. Four-channel microphone.
- Ricoh Theta X: This is a second-line model equipped with a large touch panel on the camera body. 46 GB internal memory. Capable of 4K video at 60 FPS, and 8K and 11K still image and 8K and 5.7K low fps video modes. No RAW shooting capability. Mono microphone. Replaceable battery, and MicroSDXC Memory Card support.

Comparison of Ricoh Theta 360° cameras
			Theta & m15	S	SC	SC2	V	Z1	X
Image
Current			No	No	No	Yes	No	Yes	Yes
Released			October 2013 m15: October 2014	September 2015	October 2016	December 2019	September 2017	February 2019	X March 2022
Exposure modes (P, (Note: Program automatic) A, (Note: Aperture-priority automatic) S, (Note: Shutter-priority automatic) I, (Note: ISO-priority automatic) M (Note: Manual))	Still		P, S, I	P, S, I, M				P, A, S, I, M	
Exposure modes (P, A, S, I, M)	Video		P (m15 only) | P					P, A, S, I, M	
Resolution	Still (Note: Equirectangular projection, stitching output from both lenses together. Field of view approx. 360°H×160°V)		3584×1792	L: 5376×2688; M: 2048×1024		5376×2688 (Note: Dual fisheye output also available for Theta V with firmware 3.00.1 or later, 5792×2896)		Raw: 7296×3648; JPEG: 6720×3360 (Note: Dual fisheye output also available, 7296×3648 as Raw or JPEG.)	11K: 11008 × 5504 5.5K: 5504 × 2752
Resolution	Video (Note: Dual-Fisheye view unless otherwise noted.)	8K	—	—	—	–	—	—	8K 10 fps: 120, 96 or 40 Mbps. 8K 2 fps: 64, 32 or 16 Mbps (Note: From FW version 1.40.0)
Resolution	Video	5.7K 5760x2880	—	—	—	—	—	?	/30fps 120, 64 or 32Mbps /10fps & /2fps (Note: Added in FW version 2.50.2)
Resolution	Video	4K 3840×1920	—	—	—	4Kp30 @ 54 or 32 Mbps (Note: Equirectangular video available)	4Kp30 @ 56 or 32 Mbps (Note: H264 for higher bitrate; H265 for lower bitrate)	4Kp30 @ 56 Mbps	60fps: 120, 64 or 32 Mbps (*) 30fps: 100, 54 or 32Mbps
Resolution	Video	2K 1920×1080	1080p15 (m15 only)	1080p	1080p30 @ 16Mbps	–	—	—	—
Resolution	Video	960p 1920×960	–	–	–	960p30 @ 16 or 8Mbps	960p30 @ 16 or 8Mbps	960p30 @ 16Mbps	2K: 30fps 32,16 or 8Mbps
Resolution	Video	720p 1280×720	—	720p	720p15 @ 6Mbps	—	—	—	—
ISO	Still		100–1600			64–1600 (Note: Up to 3200 in ISO-priority and manual exposure modes)		80–6400	50–3200
ISO	Video		100–400	100–1600		64–6400		80–6400	50–3200
Sensor size			?	1/2.3"				1"	1/2" (×2)
Lenses	Construction		?	7e/6g				14e/10g	?
Lenses	Focus Range		10 cm (3.9 in)—∞					40 cm (16 in)—∞	40 cm (16 in)—∞
Lenses	Aperture		?	f/2.0				f/2.1, 3.5, 5.6	f2.4
Shutter speed	Still		1/8000–1/7.5	1/6400–1/8 (Note: Up to 60sec in manual mode)	1/8000–1/8	1/25000–1/8			
Shutter speed	Video		1/8000–1/15	1/8000–1/30 (Note: Up to 1/15 in medium bitrate mode)		1/25000–1/30			
Memory			4GB	8GB	8GB	14GB	19GB		~46GB
Battery life	Still images (Note: Tested by taking one photograph every 30 seconds and transferring it to a smartphone.)		200	260			300		~220
Battery life	Video, min	8K	—	—	—	–	—	—	2fps: 60
Battery life	Video, min	5.7K	—	—	—	–	80	60	30fps: 30
Battery life	Video, min	4K	—	—	—	70	80	60	30fps: 30
Battery life	Video, min	2K	?	?	?	70	80	60	?
Ports			μ-USB	μ-USB, HDMI-D	μ-USB	μ-USB, microphone		USB-C	USB-C
Dimensions (W×H×D)			42 mm × 129 mm × 22.8 mm 1.65 in × 5.08 in × 0.90 in (Note: 17.4 mm (0.69 in) depth excluding lens section.)	44 mm × 130 mm × 22.9 mm 1.73 in × 5.12 in × 0.90 in (Note: 17.9 mm (0.70 in) depth excluding lens section.)	45.2 mm × 130.6 mm × 22.9 mm 1.78 in × 5.14 in × 0.90 in			48 mm × 132.5 mm × 29.7 mm 1.89 in × 5.22 in × 1.17 in (Note: 24 mm (0.94 in) depth excluding lens section.)	51.7mm (W) × 136.2mm (H) × 29.0mm (21.5mm *1) (D)
Weight			95 g 3.4 oz	125 g 4.4 oz	102 g 3.6 oz	104 g 3.7 oz	121 g 4.3 oz	182 g 6.4 oz	~170g
