= Journal of Contingencies and Crisis Management =

- Discipline: International Relations; Peace and conflict studies
- Language: English

Publication details
- History: 1993–present
- Publisher: Wiley-Blackwell
- Frequency: quarterly

Standard abbreviations
- ISO 4: J. Contingencies Crisis Manag.

Indexing
- ISSN: 0966-0879

Links
- Journal homepage

The Journal of Contingencies and Crisis Management (JCCM) is a multi-disciplinary, peer-reviewed academic journal that covers all theoretical and practical aspects relating to crisis management.

JCCM was founded in 1993 by Prof. Uriel Rosenthal and Prof. Alexander Kouzmin (University of Plymouth). As of September 2026, the current editor is Dr. W. Timothy Coombs.

Subject areas include: emergency management, risk management, contingency plans, foreign policies, ecological crisis, financial crisis, international relations, security policies, and conflict resolution.

JCCM is published by Wiley-Blackwell. Reviews from older issues are regularly re-published in the Political ReviewNet database.
