= Ricoh Caplio RX =

Digital camera model

The Caplio RX is a digital camera marketed to the public under the Ricoh brand. According to a Ricoh news release (as cited in the Digital Photography Review web page listed in the "References" section), the Caplio RX features the fastest shutter response time of any comparable camera in the world as of 4 March 2004, at 0.12 seconds.

== See also ==
- List of Ricoh products
