= Ricoh Synchrofax =

Ricoh Synchrofax is a Japanese dictating machine from 1959, reissued in 1974 as the 3M Sound Page (model 627AA and 627AG) as official teaching material in the US-state of Oklahoma. It is also known as sound paper. Inventor Sakae Fujimoto filed the patents US3074724A and US3046357A in 1959.

== Technology ==
The device produced by Ricoh uses bottom side magnetic coated paper, positioned by three perforations on three pins on device. A tape head on a rotating disc is spirally moved from outside to inside while the recording material (paper) stays still. Up to four minutes can be recorded per sheet. Microphone, headphones and monitor jacks are 3.5mm plugs.

The device is 12 lb 9 oz or 5.7 kg, has 11 transistors and dimensions of 10.6×5.5×14.8 inch, which equal 270×140×375 mm.

In 1973, the 3M device for schools cost US$299, which would be around $2100 today.

This technology dates back to 1959 but the idea of coating paper in magnetic materials like ferric oxide and recording on them wasn't new at the time. Some of the first open reel recorders used paper reels of tape with special coating.
