= Ricoh WG-4 =

Overview
- Maker: Ricoh

Lens
- Lens: 25-100mm equivalent
- F-numbers: f/2.0-f/4.9 at the widest

Sensor/medium
- Sensor type: BSI-CMOS
- Sensor size: 6.17 x 4.55mm (1/2.3 inch type)
- Maximum resolution: 4608 x 3456 (16 megapixels)
- Film speed: 125-6400
- Recording medium: SD, SDHC or SDXC memory card

Focusing
- Focus areas: 9 focus points

Shutter
- Shutter speeds: 1/4000s to 4s
- Continuous shooting: 2 frames per second

Image processing
- White balance: Yes

General
- LCD screen: 3 inches with 460,000 dots
- Dimensions: 124 x 64 x 33mm (4.88 x 2.52 x 1.3 inches)
- Weight: 230g including battery

The Ricoh WG-4 is a digital compact camera announced by Ricoh on 5 February 2014, successor to the Pentax WG-3. It is advertised as water-proof to 14m, shock-proof to drops from up to a 2m height, crush-proof to 220 pounds of force and freeze-proof to −10 degrees Celsius.

== Notes and references ==
- "Ricoh WG-4: Digital Photography Review".
