= Ricoh =

Japanese imaging and electronics company

Ricoh Company, Ltd.

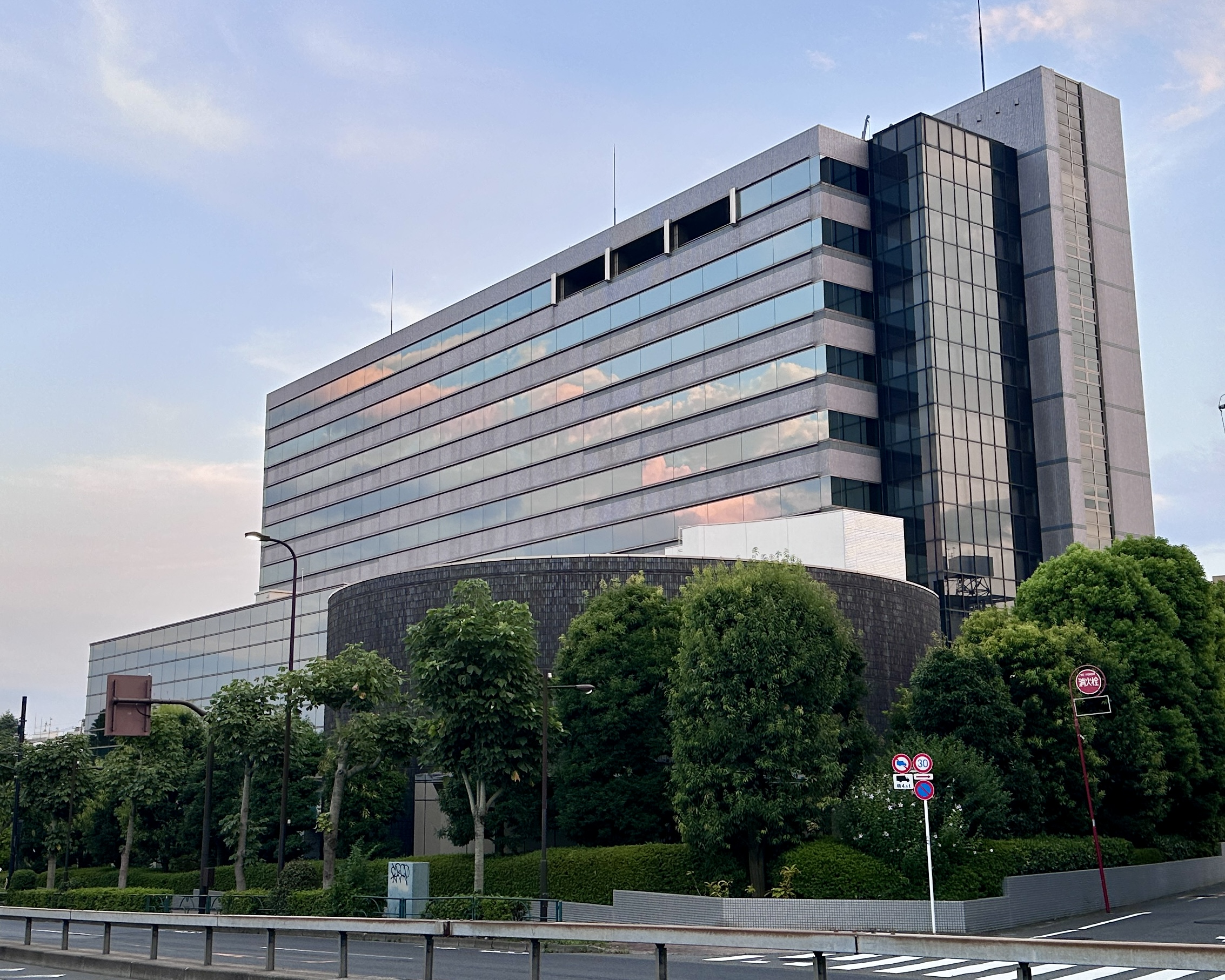
- Ricoh's headquarters in Ōta, Tokyo
- Native name: 株式会社リコー
- Romanized name: Kabushiki gaisha Rikō
- Type: Public
- Traded as: TYO: 7752
- Industry: Electronics, imaging
- Founded: February 6, 1936; 90 years ago
- Founder: Kiyoshi Ichimura
- Headquarters: Nakamagome, Ōta, Tokyo, Japan
- Area served: Worldwide
- Key people: Yoshinori Yamashita (chairman); Akira Oyama (president & CEO)
- Products: Copiers (such as plain paper copiers (PPCs)), printers (multi-functional printers (MFPs), laser printers), production printing products, facsimile machines, digital cameras, and film cameras
- Brands: Ricoh, Pentax
- Revenue: ¥2.06 trillion (US$13.03 billion) (Year ended March 31, 2018)
- Net income: ¥2.01 trillion (US$12.69 billion) (Year ended March 31, 2020)
- Number of employees: 90,141 (on consolidated basis, as of March 31, 2020)
- Subsidiaries: Pentax
- Website: www.ricoh.com

Ricoh Company, Ltd. (/ˈriːkoʊ/) (株式会社リコー, Kabushiki-gaisha Rikō) is a Japanese multinational imaging and electronics company. It was founded by the now-defunct commercial division of the Institute of Physical and Chemical Research (Riken) known as the Riken Concern, on 6 February 1936 as Riken Sensitized Paper (理研感光紙, Riken Kankōshi). Ricoh's headquarters is located in Ōta, Tokyo.

Ricoh produces electronic products, primarily cameras and office equipment such as printers, photocopiers, fax machines, and projectors, and also offers Software as a Service (SaaS) document management applications such as DocumentMall, RicohDocs, GlobalScan, Print&Share, and MakeLeaps. From the late 1990s through the early 2000s, the company grew to become the largest copier manufacturer in the world. During this time, Ricoh acquired Savin, Gestetner, Lanier, Rex-Rotary, Monroe, Nashuatec, IKON and most recently IBM Printing Systems Division / Infoprint Solutions Company. Although the Monroe brand was discontinued, products continue to be marketed worldwide under the remaining brand names. In 2006, Ricoh acquired the European operations of Danka for $210 million. These operations continue as a stand-alone business unit, under the Infotec brand.

== History ==
- 1936: The company was founded. Before it relocated to Chūō, Ricoh was established in Minato, Tokyo.
- 1955: Ricoh made its first diazo copier. Ricopy 101 was a diazo wet copier for desktop blueprint duplication. The model received certification of Mechanical Engineering Heritage #54 by the Japan Society of Mechanical Engineers (JSME) in 2012.
- 1960s and 1970s: Ricoh made wristwatches for both the Japanese domestic market and international markets, briefly entering into a partnership with Hamilton Watch Company, for the creation of the Ricoh Hamilton Electric watch.
- 1980s and 1990s: Ricoh was the primary manufacturer of Pitney-Bowes copiers. They have also manufactured copiers for Toshiba, fax machines for AT&T Corporation and Omnifax, as well as a wide variety of equipment for numerous other companies including duplicators for AB Dick. Ricoh manufactured several electronic components for video game consoles – the Ricoh 2A03 8-bit CPU with built-in PSG sound as well as the Ricoh 2C02 (PPU) used in the Nintendo Entertainment System (2A07 CPU in the PAL NES and the 6538 PPU in PAL famiclones), and the Ricoh 5A22 16-bit CPU and the Ricoh 5C77 and Ricoh 5C78 PPUs used in the Super Nintendo Entertainment System. It also supplied its RF5C68 and RF5C164 PCM sound chips to Fujitsu and Sega for the FM Towns computer, System 18 and System 32 arcade platforms and Sega CD add-on for the Genesis console.
- January 2001: Ricoh acquired Lanier Worldwide.
- 2003: Ricoh bought naming rights to the CNE Coliseum (now known as Coca-Cola Coliseum) in Toronto.
- 2004: Ricoh acquired Hitachi Printing Solutions, Ltd creating a new company, Ricoh Printing Systems, Ltd.
- 2005: Ricoh bought the naming rights to the stadium/entertainment complex, home to Coventry City Football Club, called the Ricoh Arena until 2021.
- September 2005: Ricoh launched its newly-designed logo for the Ricoh brand, designed by Landor Associates. The prior logo designed by PAOS had been introduced in 1986.
- November 2006: Ricoh announced the integration of the head office of Ricoh Europe B.V. (REBV) in Amstelveen, Netherlands, with NRG's European headquarters in London. This was completed on April 1, with the former NRG HQ in London becoming the Strategic HQ and the former REBV HQ in Amstelveen becoming the Operational HQ. This mirrors a similar process which took place in the US with Lanier and Ricoh USA. This integration was the first step within each country in Europe.
- July 1, 2007: A single country organization was created in Austria, with integration also taking place in Belgium, France, Germany, Italy, the Netherlands and Spain.
- January 25, 2007: Ricoh announced purchase of IBM Printing Systems Division for $725 million and investment in a 3-year joint venture to form the new Ricoh subsidiary, InfoPrint Solutions Company, with a 51% share.
- February 2008: Ricoh partnered with PrinterOn to set up two new HotSpot printers: The SP C410DN-KP color printer and the SP 4100N-KP monochrome printer which allows Wi-Fi enabled users to print documents from any location.
- August 27, 2008: Ricoh announced its intentions of acquiring IKON Office Solutions for $1.6 billion; on November 1, Ricoh completed the acquisition.
- May 2011: Ricoh announced a cut of 10,000 jobs worldwide up to March 2014 from the 40,000 workers in Japan and 68,900 others overseas. The company would also shift 15,000 workers to areas with more growth potential.
- July 2010: a confidentiality agreement involving Ricoh was found to be unenforceable by the High Court of England and Wales, as it breached Article 101 of the Treaty on the Functioning of the European Union, which prohibits agreements which had the object or effect of distorting competition. Judgement was made in favour of Ricoh.
- July 1, 2011: Japanese optical glass-maker Hoya Corporation said it would sell its Pentax camera business to Ricoh, in a deal the Nikkei business daily said was worth about 10 billion yen ($124.2 million). On July 29, 2011, Hoya transferred its Pentax imaging systems business to a newly established subsidiary called Pentax Imaging Corporation. On October 1, 2011, Ricoh acquired all shares of Pentax Imaging Corp. and renamed the new subsidiary Pentax Ricoh Imaging Company, Ltd.
- October 1, 2011: Ricoh announced the establishment of Pentax Ricoh Imaging Company, LTD. On August 1, 2013, the company name was changed to Ricoh Imaging Company Ltd.
- January 8, 2016: Ricoh India stated it partnered with Siemens to offer digital lifecycle management software.
- July 19, 2016: Ricoh India admitted to an estimated ₹1,123 crore accounting fraud. CEO and Managing Director Manoj Kumar, and Chairman Tetsuya Takano resigned from Ricoh India as a result.
- January 18, 2017: Ricoh Limited announced the acquisition of Avanti Computer Systems, headquartered in Toronto, Ontario, a leading provider of Print MIS (Management Information System) targeted for the production print market. In 2025, Ricoh sold Avanti to eProductivity Software.
- 2019: Ricoh announced a partnership with Cisco Systems.
- April 2022: Ricoh announced the acquisition of 80% of the shares in PFU Limited from Fujitsu Limited.
- 2024: Ricoh was entered into the MSCI KLD 400 Social Index.

== Operations ==
The Ricoh Group has sales and support, production, and research and development operations in nearly 180 countries. It has its world headquarters in Tokyo, Japan and regional headquarters in Japan, the Americas, Europe, China, and the Asia-Pacific.

=== Regional headquarters ===
- Americas Regional Headquarters
  Ricoh USA, Inc., located in Exton, PA, USA, covers the United States and Canada while Ricoh Latin America, located in South Florida, covers the Latin American countries
- Europe Regional Headquarters
  Ricoh International B.V., located in Amstelveen, the Netherlands and London, U.K. covers Europe, Africa and Middle East
- Asia/Pacific Regional Headquarters
  Ricoh Asia Pacific Pte. Ltd., located in Singapore, covers South-East Asia, Australia, New Zealand and China

=== Research groups ===
Ricoh has 272 subsidiaries (72 national and 200 overseas) which specialize in technology- and customer-research groups around the world. For example, Ricoh Innovations, a research subsidiary of Ricoh Company, operates in Silicon Valley, California, focusing on technology, cloud, mobile solutions, and customer research.

== Products ==
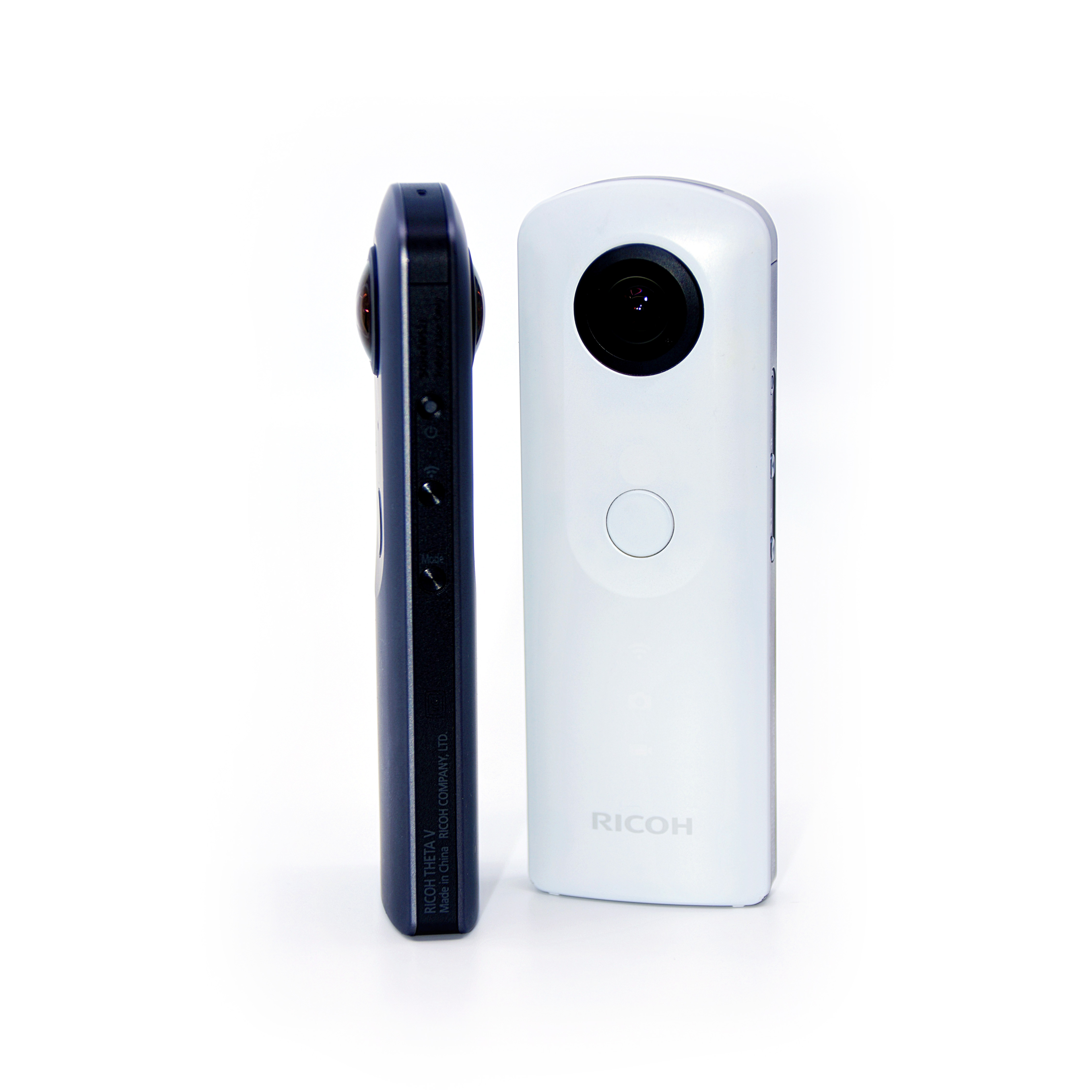
Ricoh Theta V and SC 360-degree omnidirectional camera

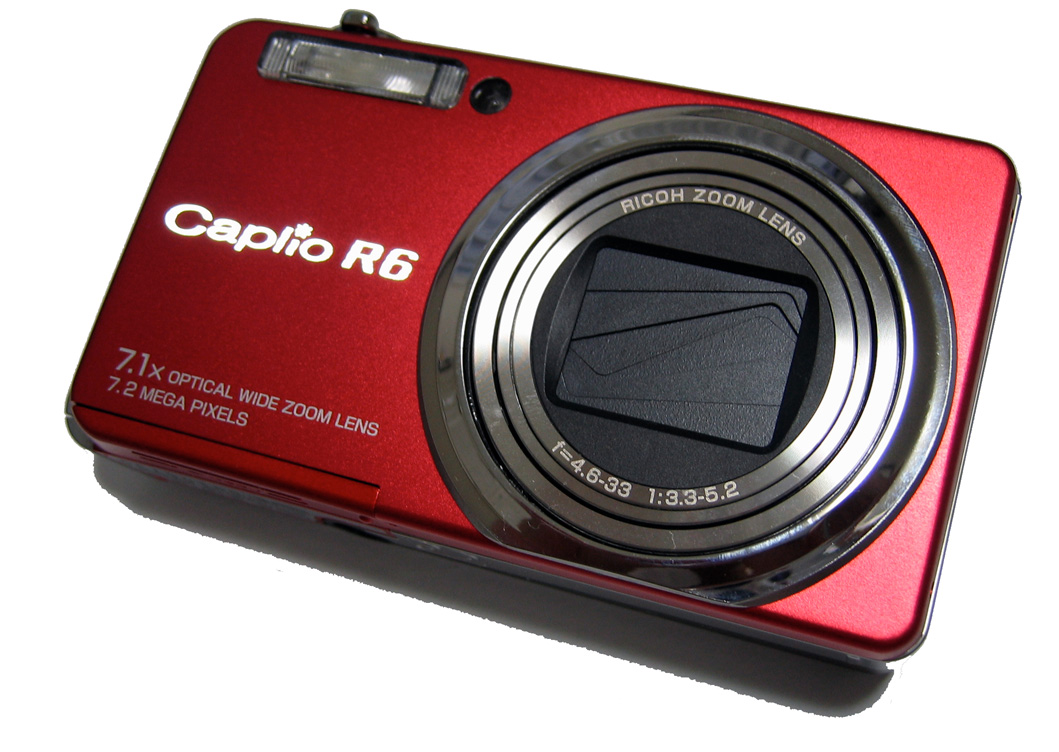
Caplio R6

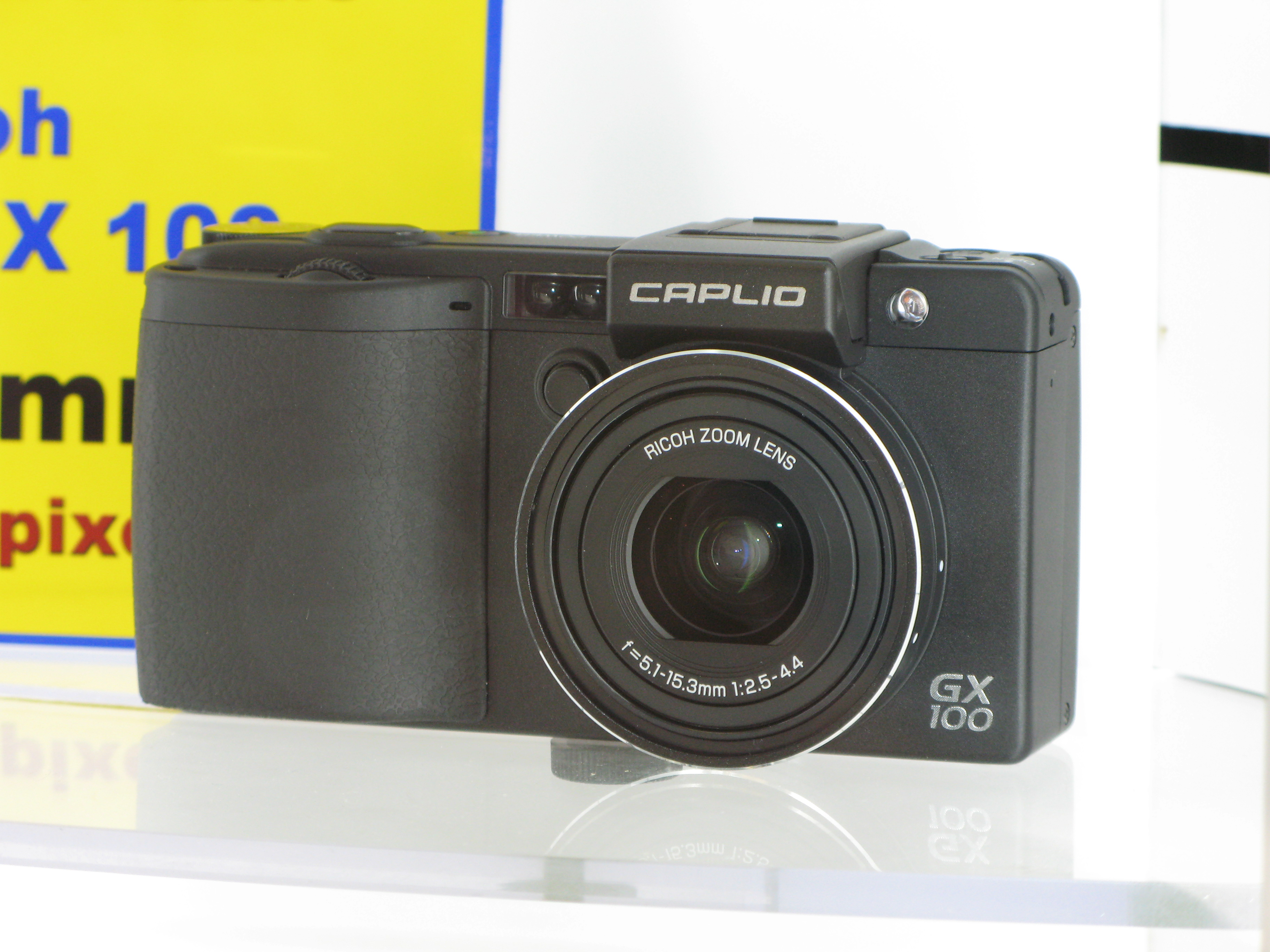
Caplio GX100

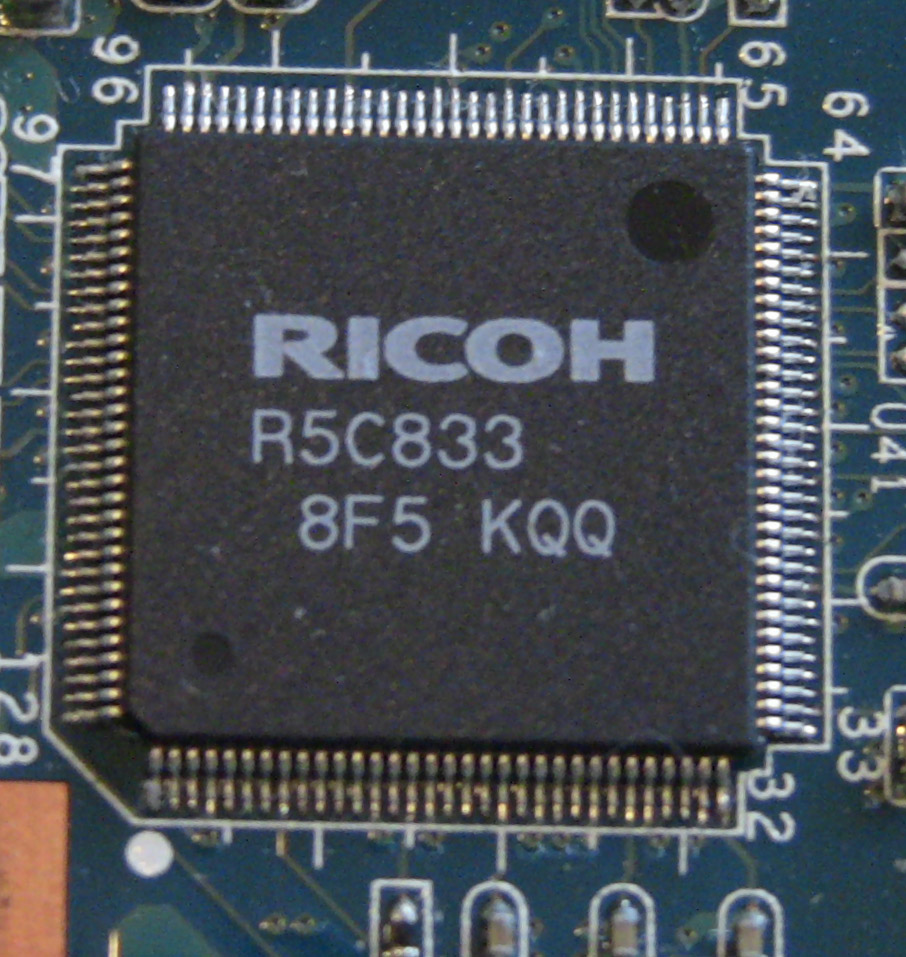
Ricoh SD/MMC card reader controller found in a Sony Vaio FW series laptop

A partial list of products marketed to the public under the Ricoh brand includes:

- Digital cameras
  - Compact
    - Ricoh RDC-1 (1995, 0.41 mexapixel)
    - Ricoh RDC-2 (1996, 0.41 megapixel)
    - Ricoh Theta (360-degree compact - 14.5 megapixel)
    - Ricoh Caplio G3 (3.24-megapixel)
    - Ricoh Caplio G4 (3.24-megapixel)
    - Ricoh RDC-5300 (2.30-megapixel)
    - Ricoh Caplio Pro G3 GPS Camera, Network ready (3.24-megapixel)
    - Ricoh Caplio RX (3-megapixel)
    - Ricoh Caplio R1 (4-megapixel, also available as Rollei DR4)
    - Ricoh Caplio R1v (5-megapixel, also available as Rollei DR5)
    - Ricoh Caplio R2 (5-megapixel, larger screen, no viewfinder)
    - Ricoh Caplio R3 (5-megapixel, 28–200 equivalent zoom)
    - Ricoh Caplio R4 (6-megapixel, 28–200 equivalent zoom)
    - Ricoh Caplio R5 (7-megapixel, 28–200 equivalent zoom)
    - Ricoh Caplio R6 (7-megapixel, 28–200 equivalent zoom, larger screen, super slim)
    - Ricoh Caplio R7 (8-megapixel, 28–200 equivalent zoom)
    - Ricoh R8 (10-megapixel, 28–200 equivalent zoom)
    - Ricoh R10 (10-megapixel, 28-200 equivalent zoom)
    - Ricoh CX1 (9-megapixel, 28-200 equivalent zoom)
    - Ricoh CX2 (9-megapixel, 28-300 equivalent zoom)
    - Ricoh CX3 (10-megapixel, 28-300 equivalent zoom)
    - Ricoh CX4 (10-megapixel, 28-300 equivalent zoom)
    - Ricoh Caplio GX (5.1-megapixel, also available as Rollei DR5100)
    - Ricoh Caplio GX8 (8-megapixel) 28-85mm equivalent zoom with 22 mm optional adaptor
    - Ricoh Caplio GX100 (10-megapixel) 24-72mm equivalent wide zoom with 19 mm optional adaptor
    - Ricoh GX200 (12-megapixel) 24-72mm equivalent wide zoom with 19mm and 135mm optional converter lenses. Replaced the GX100.
    - Ricoh Caplio 400G Wide (3.2-megapixel)
    - Ricoh Caplio 500SE (8-megapixel, 28-85mm equivalent zoom with 22 mm optional adaptor, GPS-ready)
    - Ricoh WG-M1
    - Ricoh G700
    - Ricoh WG-4
    - Ricoh WG-20
    - Ricoh WG-30
    - Ricoh WG-30W
  - GR Digital
    - Ricoh GR Digital (8-megapixel) 28 mm equivalent prime lens with 21 mm optional adaptor
    - Ricoh GR Digital II (10-megapixel) 28 mm equivalent prime lens with 21 mm optional adaptor
    - Ricoh GR Digital III (10-megapixel) 28 mm equivalent prime lens with f/1.9 aperture
    - Ricoh GR Digital IV (10-megapixel) 28 mm equivalent prime lens with f/1.9 aperture
    - Ricoh GR (16-megapixel) 28 mm equivalent prime lens with f/2.8 aperture
    - Ricoh GR II
    - Ricoh GR III
    - Ricoh GR IIIX
    - Ricoh GR IV (2025)
  - GXR interchangeable sensor system
- GPS and camera All-in-one
- Film cameras
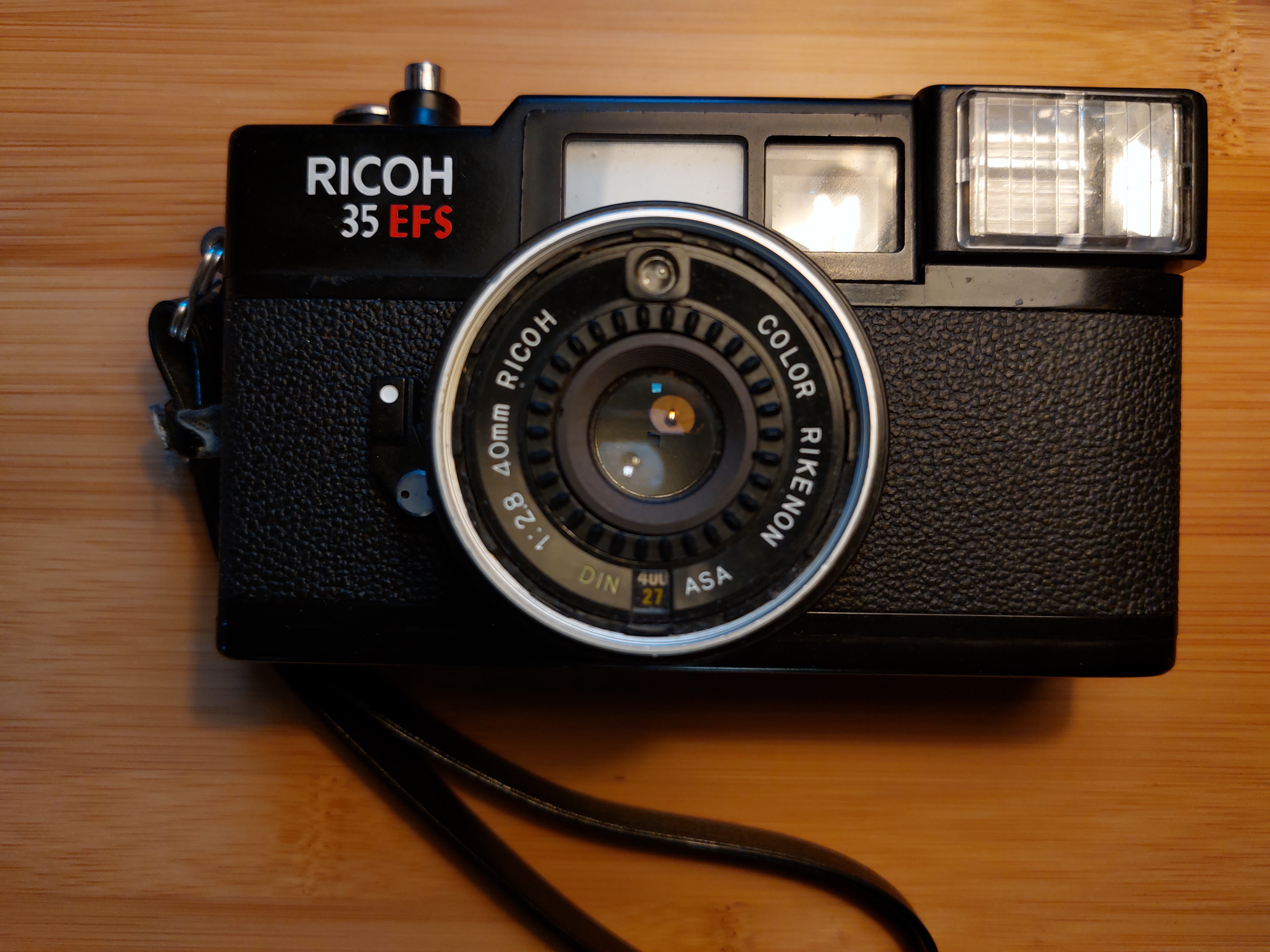
  Ricoh 35 EFS
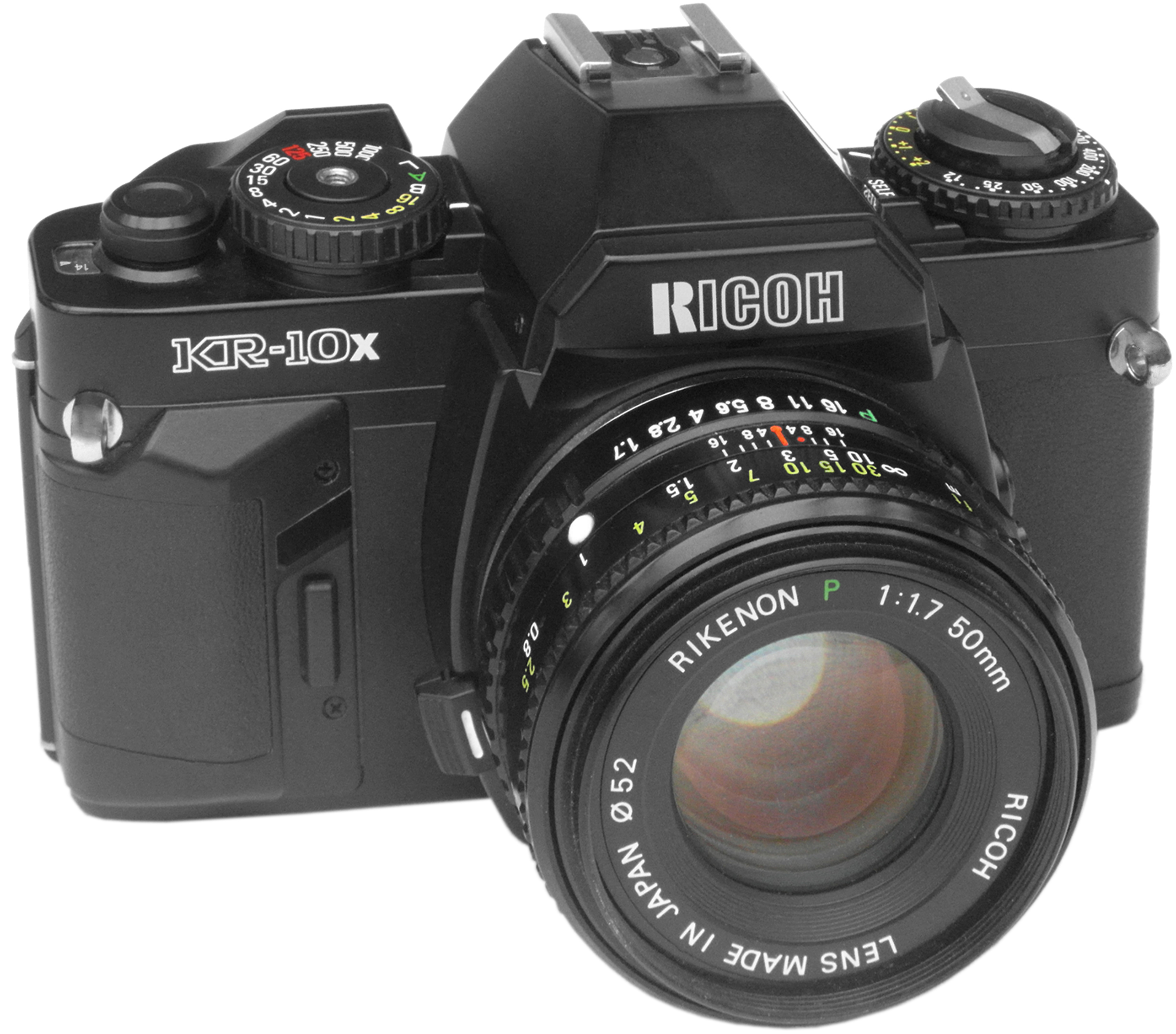
  Ricoh KR-10x SLR camera
  - Ricoh 35 EFS
  - Ricoh 500 35mm rangefinder with rapid film advance and fast focusing
  - Ricoh 500G 35mm compact rangefinder
  - Ricoh Mirai (similar to the Olympus AZ-4 Zoom)
  - Ricoh Ricoh Singlex (Nikon F mount, made by Mamiya - same body as Nikkorex F, and Sears SLII)
  - Ricoh Ricoh Singlex TLS (M42 lens mount, same as Sears TLS)
  - Ricoh Ricoh Singlex II (M42 lens mount)
  - Golden Ricoh 16 subminiature camera.

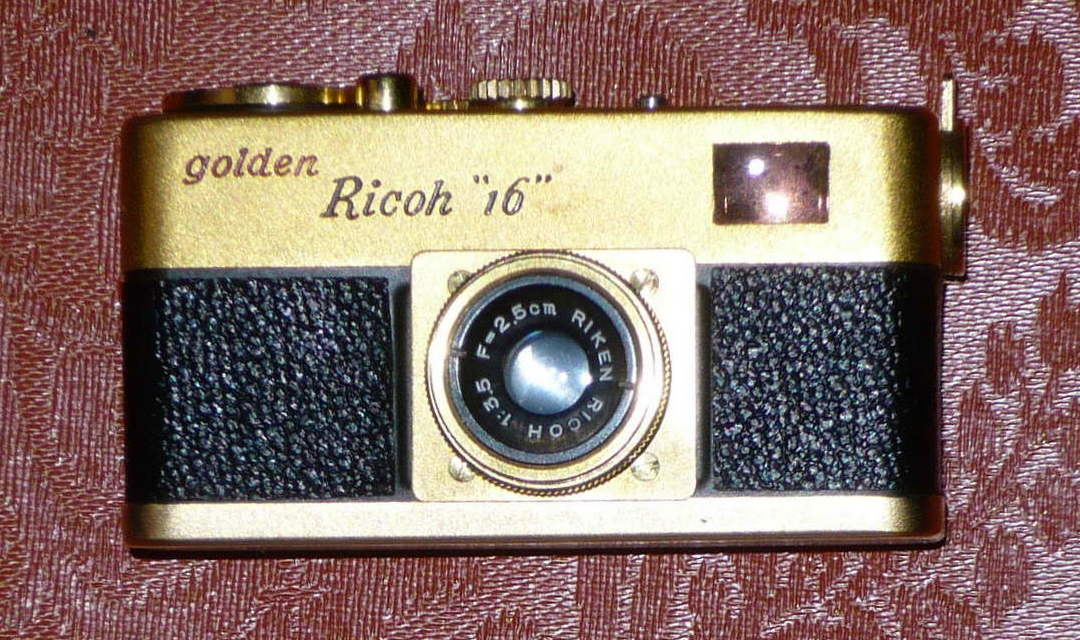
Golden Ricoh 16mm camera

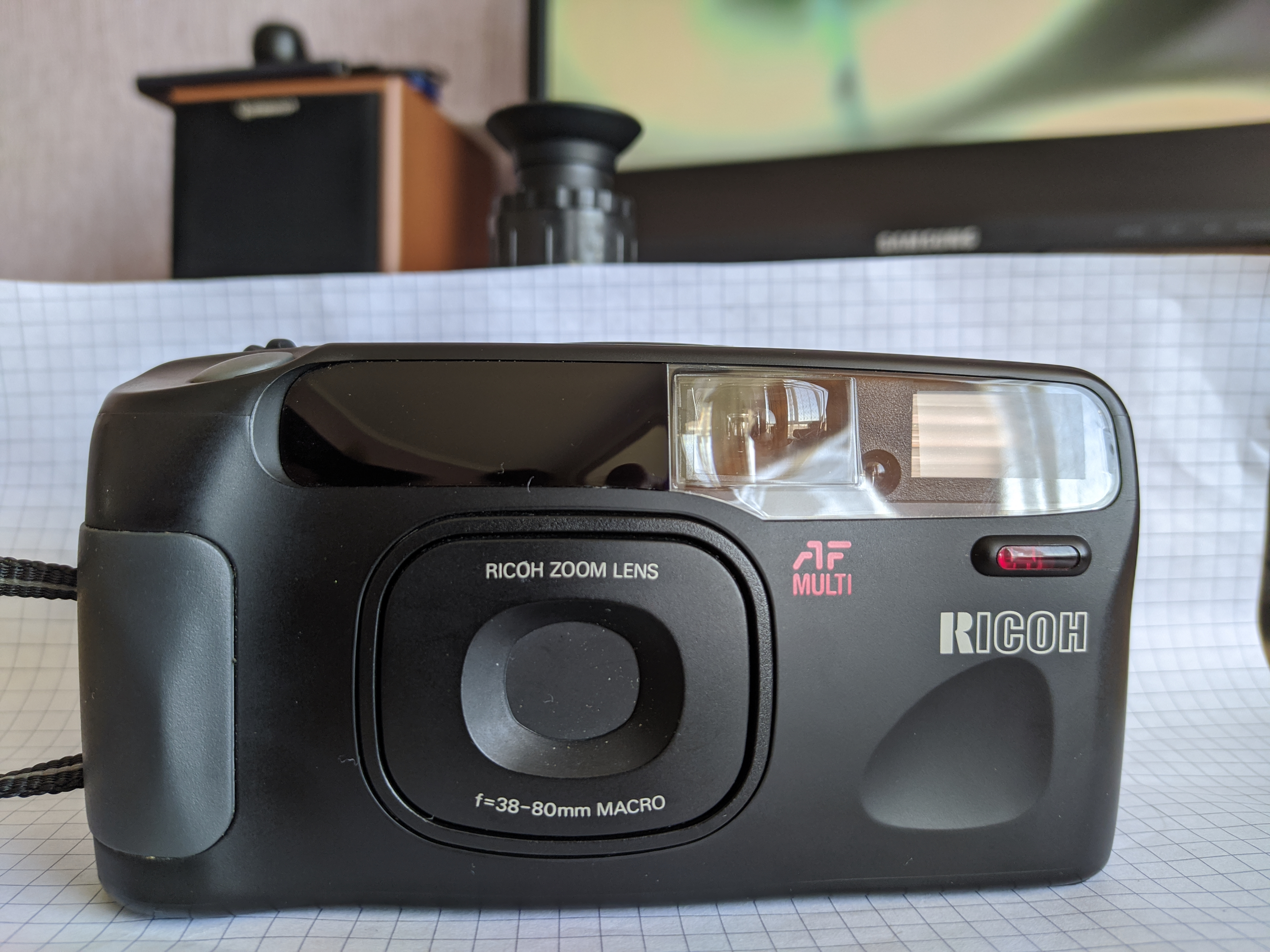
Ricoh RZ-800

  - Ricoh KR-5 (R-K mount)
  - Ricoh KR-5 Super (R-K mount)
  - Ricoh KR-5 Super II (R-K mount)
  - Ricoh KR-10 (R-K mount)
  - Ricoh KR-10 Super (R-K mount)
  - Ricoh KR-30SP (R-K mount)
  - Ricoh GR film cameras (GR1, GR1s and GR1V, GR10, GR21)
  - Ricoh XR-1 (Pentax K mount)
  - Ricoh XR-2 (Pentax K mount)
  - Ricoh XR-2s (Pentax K mount)
  - Ricoh XR7 (Pentax K mount)
  - Ricoh XR-500 (R-K mount)
  - Ricoh XR-10/KR-10X (R-K mount)
  - Ricoh XR-10M (R-K mount)
  - Ricoh XR-M (R-K mount)
  - Ricoh XR-P (R-K mount)
  - Ricoh XR-S (R-K mount)
  - Ricoh XR-X (R-K mount)
  - Ricoh FF-9D
  - Ricoh RZ-800
- Multifunction Products/Printers
  - Ricoh Aficio (Ricoh has used Aficio as a global brand since 1996.)
    - Ricoh Aficio MP C 2500
  - Ricoh Pro
- DocumentMall (SaaS document-management)
  - Software as a Service (SaaS) Defined
  - Secure Storage—HIPAA and Sarbanes-Oxley (SOX) Compliant
  - Document Management
  - Industry Solutions
  - Accounts Payable Solution
- Software Solutions
  - Print&Share (output management and security)
  - Streamline NX (Print Management and document-capture)
  - GlobalScan (document-capture and distribution software)
- Projectors
  - Mobile
    - PJ X2130
    - PJ WX2130
  - Desk-Edge and Short Throw
    - PJ X3340
    - PJ WX3340
    - PJ WX3340N
    - PJ X4240N
    - PJ WX4240N
    - PJ X3241
  - Ultra-short-throw Projectors
    - PJ WX4141
    - PJ WX4141N
    - PJ WX4141NI
  - Standard Installation
    - PJ WX5361N
    - PJ X537N
  - Conference Room
    - PJ WX6170N
    - PJ X6180N
- Unified Communication Systems
  - P1000
  - P3000
  - P3500
  - Ricoh UCS App for tablet and smartphones
- Interactive WhiteBoard
  - Ricoh InteractiveWhiteboard D5500
- Ricoh Data Center Services
- Optical Disc Storage
  - EncryptEase

== Sponsorships ==
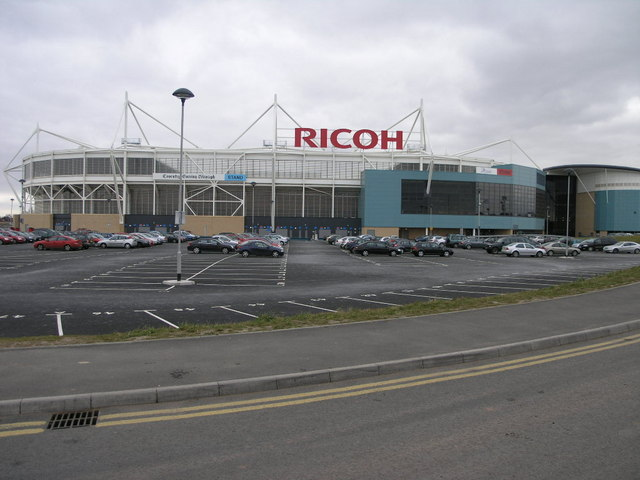
Ricoh Arena, Coventry, England

- Ricoh were shirt sponsors of Stoke City from 1981 to 1985.
- Ricoh Arena, a football and rugby stadium complete with a concert hall and conference facilities, opened in Coventry, England in 2005, bearing the company's name due to a naming rights agreement. Renamed City of Coventry Stadium for the duration of the 2012 Summer Olympics due to strict sponsorship rules.
- Ricoh Black Rams, a Japanese rugby union team owned by Ricoh.
- In 2007, Ricoh acquired title sponsorship of the Women's British Open, one of then four major championships recognized by the world's dominant women's golf tour, the U.S. LPGA Tour.
- In November 2008, Ricoh unveiled the first eco-friendly billboard in Times Square, NY—entirely powered by the sun and the wind.

== See also ==
- Ricoh Theta a lineup of 360-degree cameras by Ricoh
