= Ricoh WG-20 =

Overview
- Maker: Ricoh
- Intro price: US $199.95

Lens
- Lens: 28-140mm equivalent
- F-numbers: f/3.5-f/5.5 at the widest

Sensor/medium
- Sensor type: CCD
- Sensor size: 6.17 x 4.55 mm (1/2.3 inch type)
- Maximum resolution: 4288 x 3216 (14 megapixels)
- Film speed: 80-6400
- Recording medium: SD, SDHC, or SDXC memory card

Focusing
- Focus areas: 9 focus points

Shutter
- Shutter speeds: 1/1500s to 4s
- Continuous shooting: 1 frame per second

Image processing
- White balance: Yes

General
- LCD screen: 2.7 inches with 230,000 dots
- Dimensions: 114 x 58 x 28 mm (4.49 x 2.28 x 1.1 inches)
- Weight: 164g including battery

The Ricoh WG-20 is a digital compact camera announced by Ricoh on February 5, 2014. It replaces the Pentax WG-10 and is rated as "waterproof to 33 feet, shockproof from drops of up to five feet, coldproof to 14 degrees Fahrenheit and crushproof, withstanding up to 220 foot-pounds of force" by its manufacturer.
