= Security Management (magazine) =

Security Management is the monthly magazine of ASIS International (formerly the American Society for Industrial Security). It was launched in 1972. The publication combines featured articles on topics such as terrorism and corporate espionage, with staff-written departments covering news and trends, homeland security, IT security, and legal developments. The magazine is based in Alexandria, Virginia.
