= Ricoh 500 =

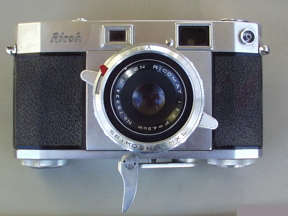
Fast film advance lever is deployed at the bottom.

The Ricoh 500 was one of the early relatively inexpensive 35 mm rangefinder cameras to enter the U.S. market in 1957. It had an unusually large (for that time) f/2.8 lens, and shutter speeds from 1 second to 1/500 second. Film was advanced by a rapid-throw "trigger" mechanism on the bottom, and focus was controlled by two buttons, at the 3 o'clock and 9 o'clock positions that permitted very rapid shifts of focus when needed for basketball and other such sporting events. Flash could be fired from a "hot shoe" on the top and from a regular socket connection.

The photograph above shows the external flash connection socket in the upper right corner. The red lever selects among M, F, and X flash synchronizations. The shutter button is barely visible over the letter "h" of "Ricoh." The two large knobs are designed to let the user's two index fingers rapidly focus the camera while following basketball players or other rapidly moving subjects. The wired mount for an external flash unit is shown in the center of the top view of the camera. The rapid film advance lever shown in the bottom view pivots on its right end and is pulled by the extension (shown folded out of the way) near the lens barrel. The bottom view also shows a reminder ring for noting the speed of the film currently in use.

The Riken Ricomat lens had a focal length of 4.5 cm. The Seikosha shutter had provision for "m," "x," and "l" synchronization.

The rings controlling the effective lens diameter (from f/2.8 to f/22) and the shutter speed are mechanically linked so that once one combination has been matched to the ambient lighting conditions, a faster shutter speed can be selected and a larger effective lens diameter will automatically be set when possible. For instance, one might start with a setting of f/11 and 1/250 second, but decide that the moving target demanded the higher shutter speed of 1/500. Simply setting that shutter speed without changing the effective lens aperture would result in an underexposure, but the Ricoh 500 will automatically change the aperture setting to f/8.

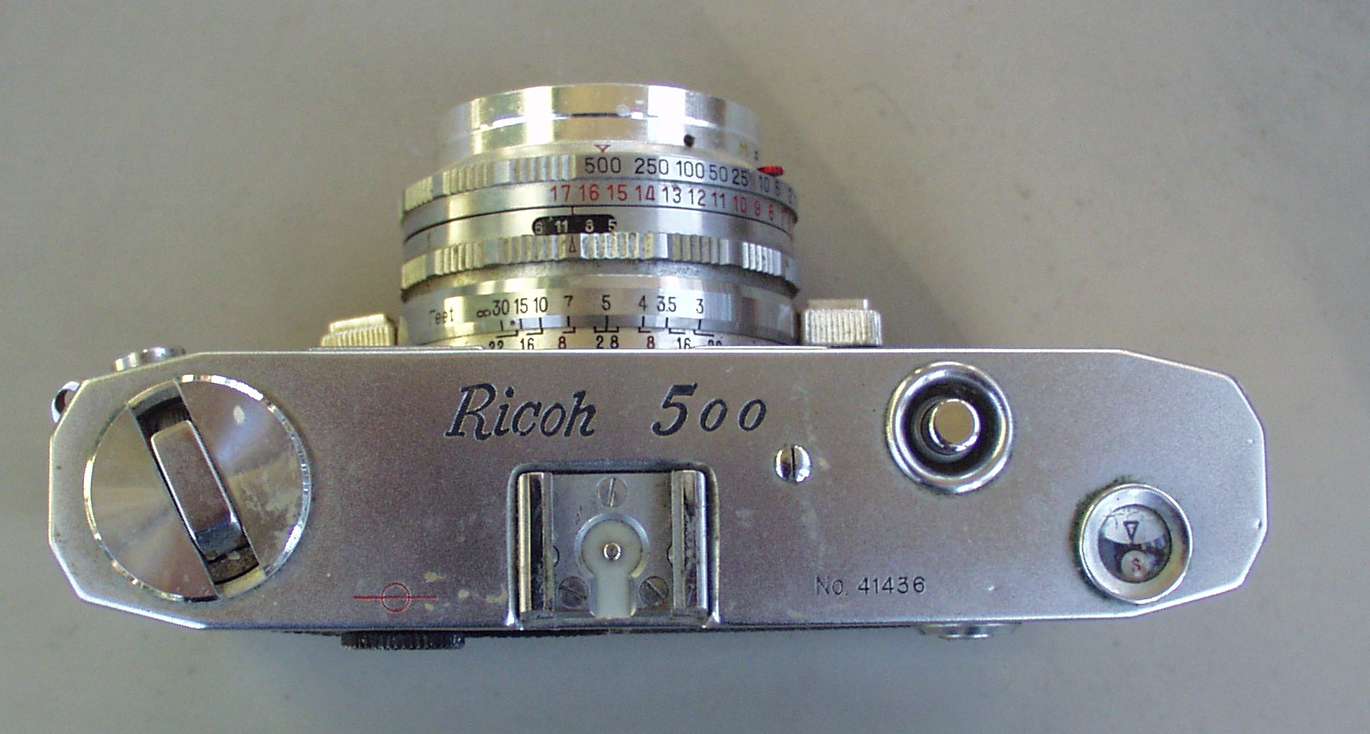
Top view

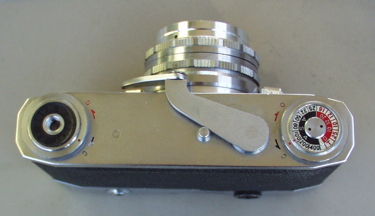
Bottom view
