= Ricoh G700 =

Ricoh G700SE
Overview
- Maker: Ricoh

Lens
- Lens: 28-140 mm equivalent
- F-numbers: f/3.5-f/5.5 at the widest

Sensor/medium
- Sensor type: CCD
- Sensor size: 6.17 x 4.55 mm (1/2.3 inch type)
- Maximum resolution: 4000 x 3000 (12 megapixels)
- Film speed: 64-3200
- Recording medium: SD or SDHC memory card

Shutter
- Shutter speeds: 1/1500s to 8s

Image processing
- White balance: Yes

General
- LCD screen: 3 inches with 920,000 dots
- Dimensions: 117 x 68 x 32 mm (4.61 x 2.68 x 1.26 inches)
- Weight: 307g including battery

The Ricoh G700 and Ricoh G700SE are tough digital compact cameras made by Ricoh. They are marked out by meeting high industrial standards for protection against ingress of dust, water, and for its toughness against drops. They can be cleaned with ethanol and hypochlorous acid-based disinfectants, making them suitable for medical environments requiring high standards of hygiene. Their large buttons are designed for use with gloved hands.

The camera can be password-protected at several different levels, and has a facility in conjunction with a desktop software to allow image tampering to be detected. The camera can also read barcodes and store the obtained information as a "memo" in image EXIF headers.

== G700SE ==
The Ricoh G700SE was announced on September 21, 2010. This model adds wireless LAN and Bluetooth connectivity, and allows for attachment and connectivity with a specific laser barcode reading or GPS accessory.

== Ruggedness ==
Both cameras, when used without accessories, withstand drops from 2 meters even while switched on, and immersion in water to a depth of 5 meters for up to two hours.

With the laser barcode reader or GPS accessory attached, the G700SE is only certified as splashproof. With either the optional wide angle adapter or laser barcode reader (G700SE only) attached, shock protection declines to 1.5 meters, and with the GPS unit to 1.2 meters.
