= Rollei Prego =

Rollei compact film and digital cameras

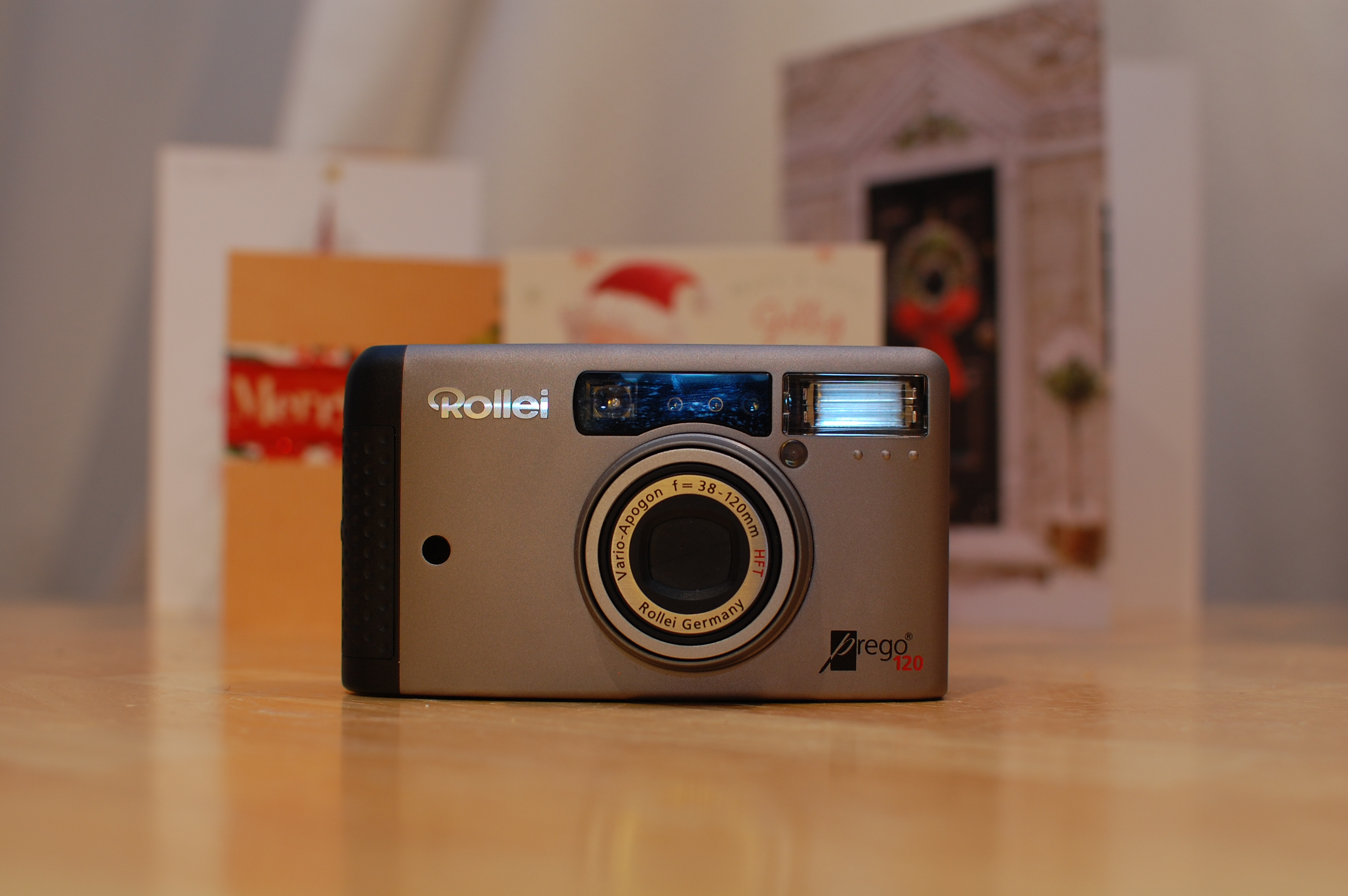
Rollei Prego 120

Most of the point-and-shoot film and digital cameras marketed by Rollei starting in the early 1990s are branded Rollei Prego, after the Rollei brand had been acquired by Samsung Techwin. In addition, point-and-shoot cameras from Rollei were sold with other branding, including Rollei Giro (Advanced Photo System film cartridges). The cameras generally were rebadged from models manufactured by other makers, including Ricoh, Samsung and Fujifilm.

== List of cameras ==
Rollei Prego 135 film cameras
Name	Lens				Modes	Year	OEM	Notes / Refs.
Name	F.L.	Ap.	Brand	Constr.	Modes	Year	OEM	Notes / Refs.
Prego AF	35	f/3.5	Rolleinar / Xenar	?		1992	Samsung AF-Slim	
Prego Zoom AF	35-70	f/3.9–7.1	Variogon	7e		?	Samsung AF-Slim Zoom	Also sold as X70 Zoom
Prego 145 AF	38-145	f/3.7–10.9	Vario Apogon	?		?	Samsung Maxima Zoom 145	
Prego 90 AF	28-90	f/3.6–9.8	Vario Apogon	11e/8g		?	Samsung Maxima Zoom 90i	
Prego Micron AF	30/24	f/3.5	Curtagon	?		?	Ricoh R1	
Prego 100WA	28-100	f/5.8–10.5	Vario Apogon	6e/6g		?	Samsung Maxima Zoom 100GLM	
Prego 115	38-115	f/3.9–10.7	Vario Apogon	?		?	Samsung Maxima Zoom Evoca / Evoca Zoom 115	
Prego 120	38-120	?	Vario-Apogon	?		?		
Prego 125	38-125	f/4.6–11.1	Vario-Apogon	?		?		
Prego 140	38-140	?	Vario Apogon	?		?	Samsung Evoca 140S / Vega 140S	
Prego 30	30	f/3.5	Apogon	3e		?		
Prego 70	35-70	?	Vario Apogon	?		?	Samsung Evoca 70S	
Prego 160	38-160	?	Vario Apogon	?		?		

Other Rollei 135 film point-and-shoot cameras
Name	Lens				Modes	Year	OEM	Notes / Refs.
Name	F.L.	Ap.	Brand	Constr.	Modes	Year	OEM	Notes / Refs.
AFM35	38	f/2.6	S-Apogon	4e/3g		?	Fujifilm Klasse	
QZ 35T	38-90	f/2.8–5.6	S-Vario Apogon	10e/8g	P/ A/ S/ M	1997	—	
QZ 35W	28-60	f/2.8–5.6	S-Vario Apogon	10e/8g	P/ A/ S/ M	1997	—	
