= Ricoh GR film cameras =

Ricoh GRx (film camera series)
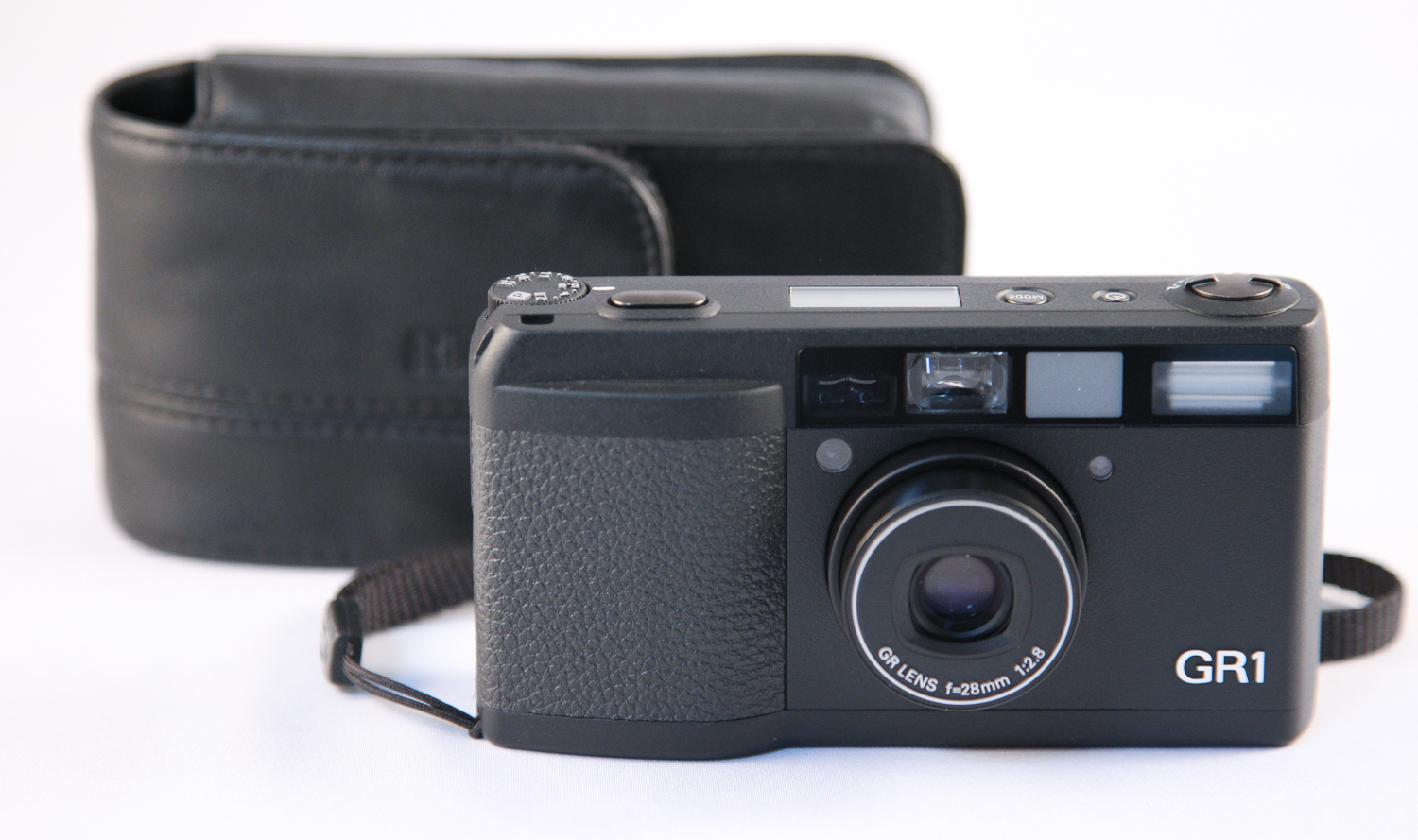
- Ricoh GR1, with case

Overview
- Maker: Ricoh
- Type: 35mm compact
- Released: October 1996

Lens
- Lens mount: fixed
- Lens: 28mm f/2.8 or 21mm f/3.5

Sensor/medium
- Sensor type: film
- Sensor size: 36×24 mm
- Film format: 35mm

General
- Body features: magnesium or aluminum alloy
- Made in: Japan

Chronology
- Successor: Ricoh GR Digital

The Ricoh GR was a series of point-and-shoot, or compact, 35 mm film cameras made by Ricoh and introduced between 1996 and 2001. Specific camera models include the GR1, GR10, GR1s, GR1v, and GR21. The GR name was later used for Ricoh's GR series of digital cameras, which began production in 2005.

The cameras had a very high quality 1:2.8 28 mm lens. Exposure control could be program automatic or aperture priority semi-automatic. They had a built-in flash and date imprinting versions were also available.

== Overview ==
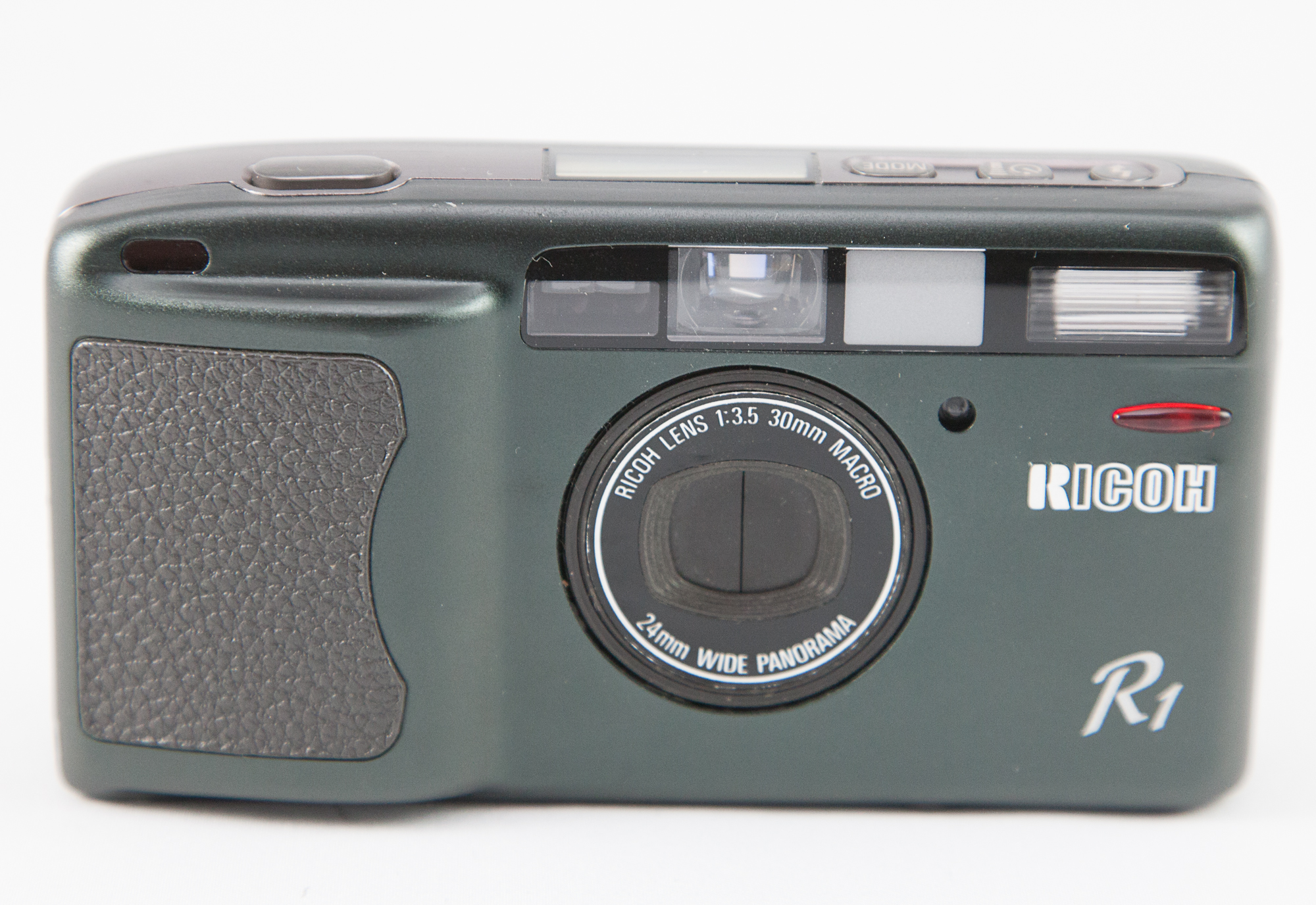
Ricoh R1 (1994), automated predecessor with similar form factor

Because the diameter of a 135 film cartridge is 25 mm (0.98 in), most cameras were limited to a minimum thickness of 30 mm (1.2 in). Ricoh released the R1 in 1994, claiming it to be the world's thinnest camera; the camera has a distinctive grip section for the photographer's right hand which accommodates the film cartridge, but the remainder of the body is thinned down to improve portability. The R1 has a 30 mm f/3.5 lens with four elements in four groups and a panorama crop function; the body is made of aluminum, with a plastic rear door.

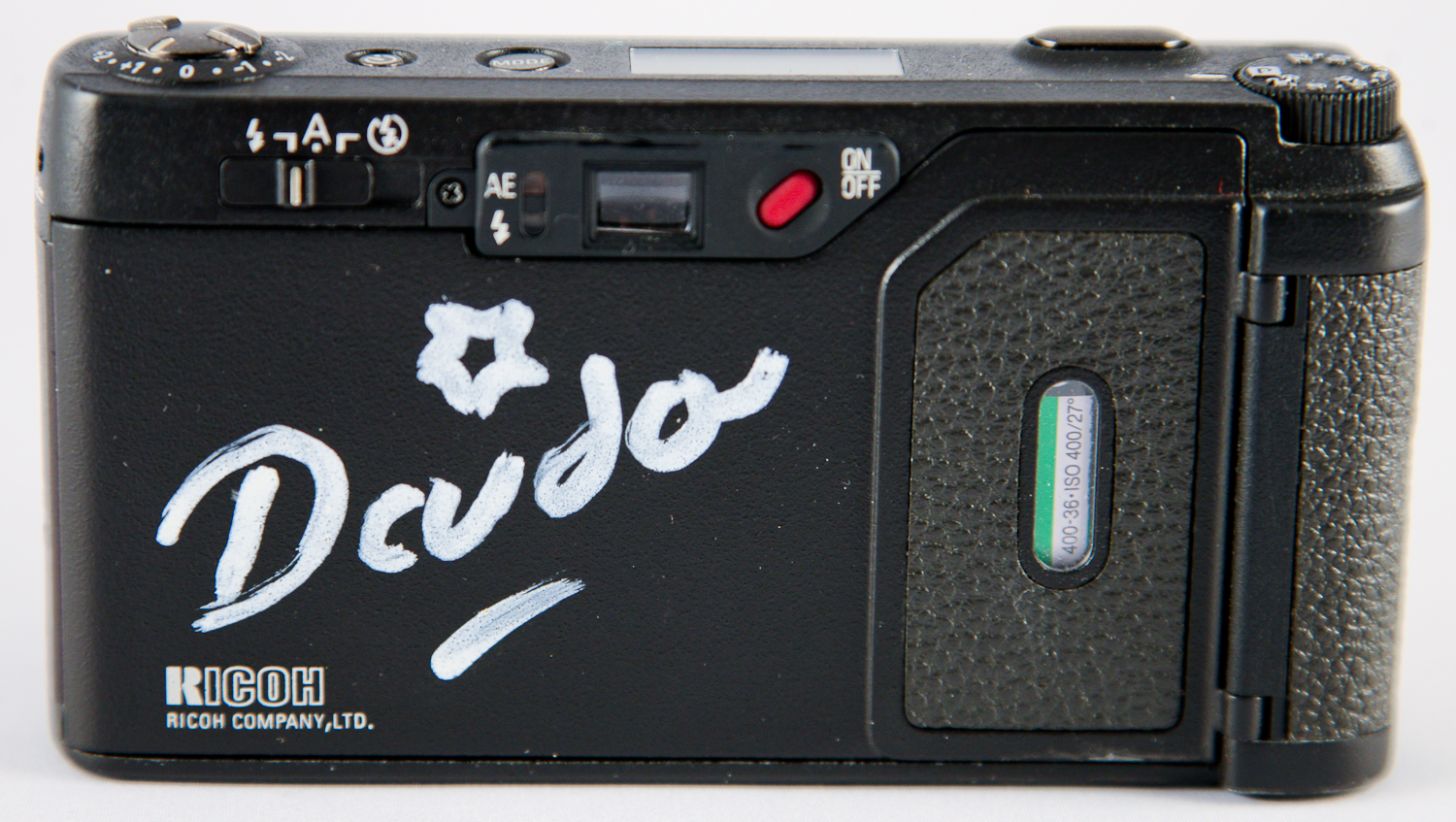
Ricoh GR1 (rear), signed by Daido Moriyama

Although the R1 was commercially successful, professional photographers requested a camera with more manual controls, and Ricoh responded with the GR1. Compared to the R1, the GR1 uses a similar viewfinder but is fitted with a magnesium alloy body and a 28 mm f/2.8 lens which Ricoh claimed to perform better than equivalent lenses for single lens reflex cameras. The GR1 first was released in late 1996 and received the 1997 TIPA award for best 35 mm Compact Camera. As an operational quirk, the GR1 shoots backwards: when the cartridge is loaded initially, the camera winds the film all the way out, which takes approximately 30 seconds; as exposures are taken, the film is wound back into the cartridge. With its lightweight body, the GR1 had a weight and volume smaller than many 28 mm lenses for SLRs. British conflict photographer Philip Jones Griffiths owned and used a GR1.

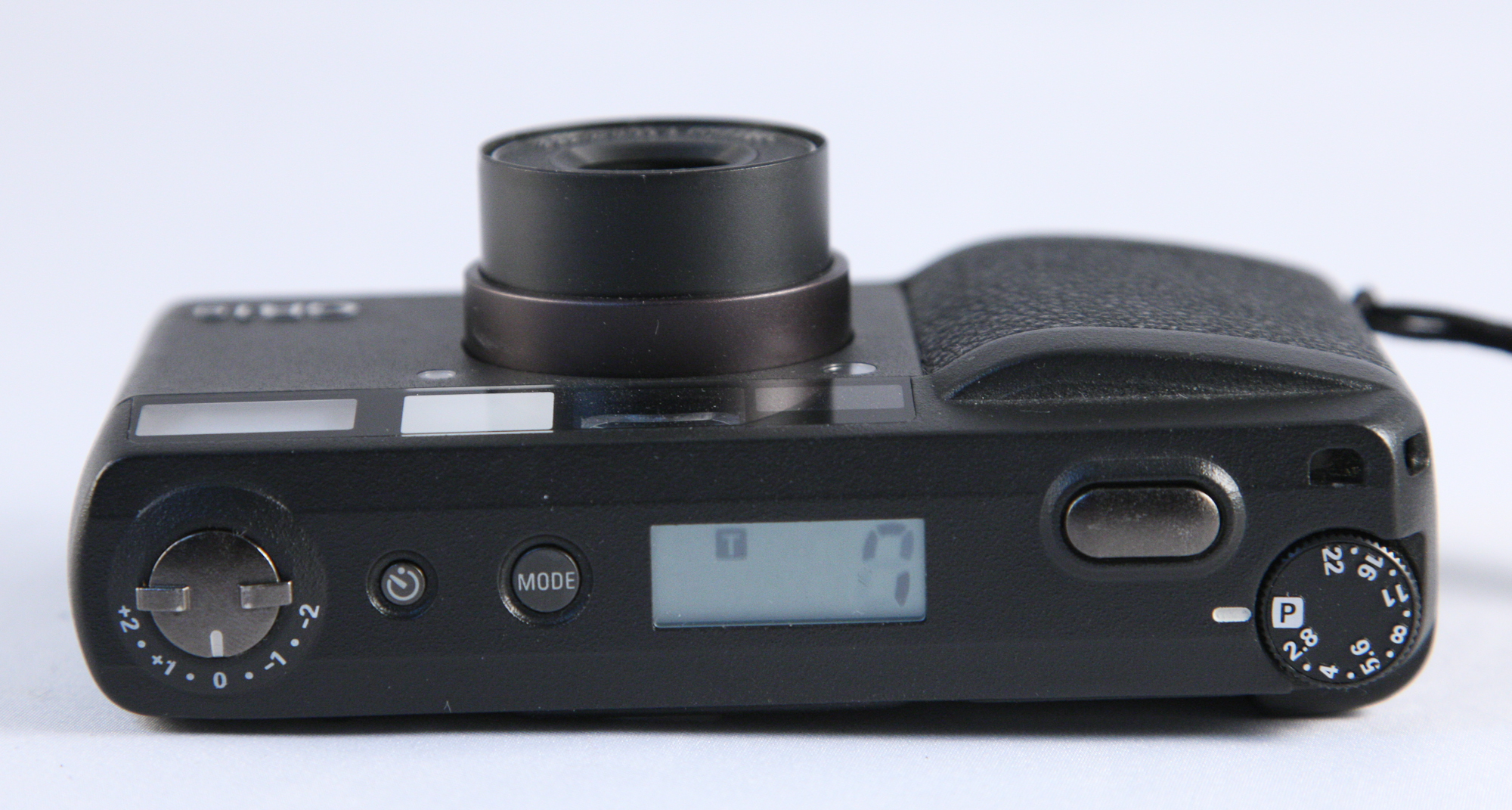
Ricoh GR1s, top deck

Ricoh released a limited production run of the 28 mm GR lens in 1997, limited to 3000 copies, as a manually-focused lens with a M39 lens mount; the GR lens is nearly symmetric, featuring a concave front surface and seven-element, four-group construction. In 1998, a simplified version (GR10) and update (GR1s) were added to the line. Both shared the same 28 mm lens as GR1. The GR10 was fitted with an aluminum body and the aperture-priority autoexposure mode was removed. The GR1s had improved lens coatings for better flare resistance and other minor feature updates. Ricoh also released a 21 mm GR lens in 1999 as another limited production optic (1700 in total) with M39 mount; this was a nine-element, six-group lens which also had a nearly-symmetric design, and was almost as compact as the 28 mm lens.

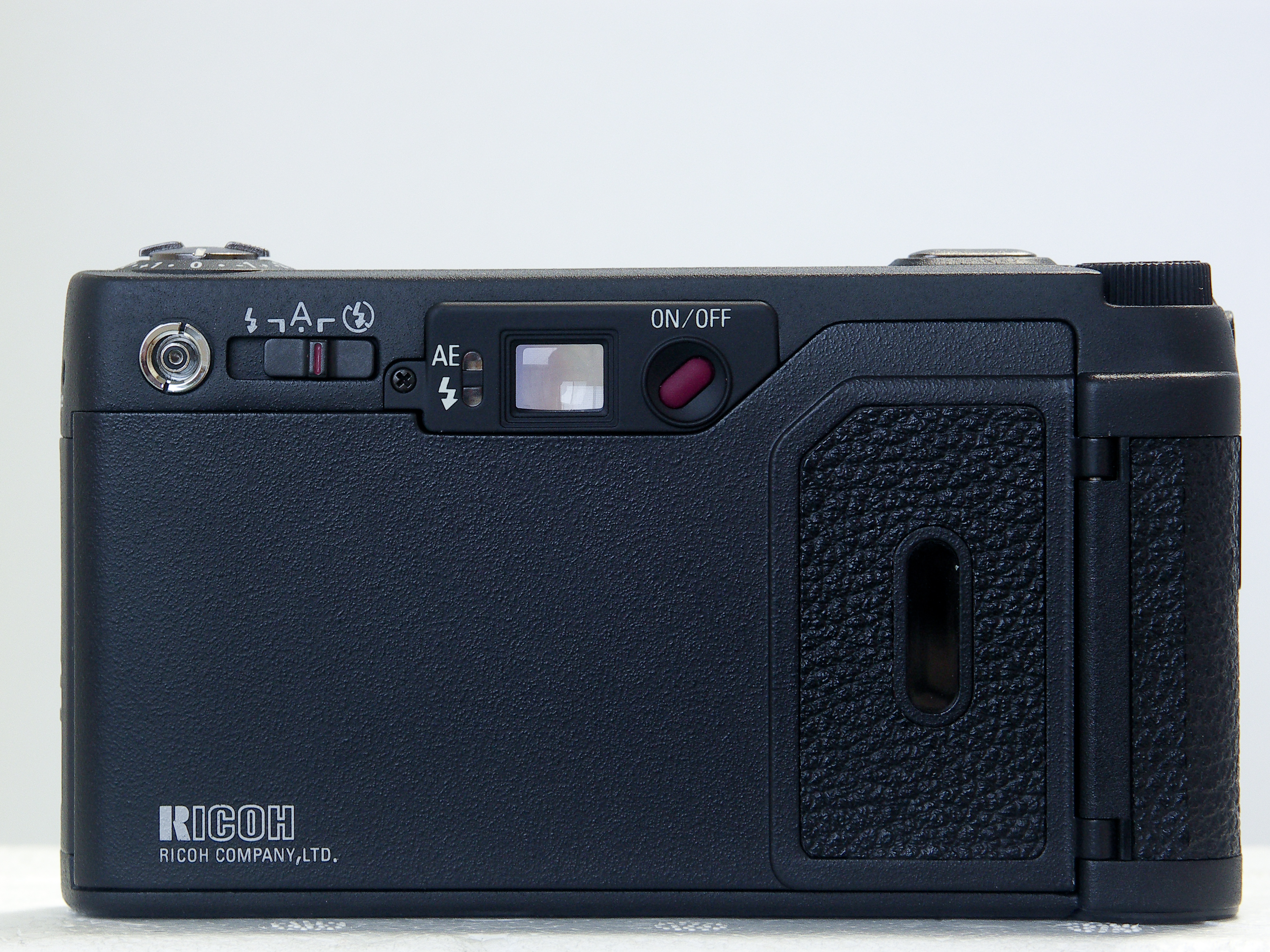
Ricoh GR21 (rear), with date imprinting function

The final two models came out in 2001: the GR21, with the wide 21 mm lens, and the GR1v, another incremental improvement on the GR1s. The GR21 won the 2001 TIPA Award for Best 35MM Prestige Camera. The GR1v adds fixed-focus distance settings (branded SNAP focus) and manual ISO selection. Japanese street photographer Daido Moriyama is known to have used the GR1v.

The film GR cameras were discontinued after the introduction of the Ricoh GR Digital in 2005; over time, the most common faults that have developed have affected the status LCD on the top deck, the motor, and the light seals, particularly around the film information window on the rear door. In 2014, Ricoh discontinued service for the film GR cameras. The GR21 was made in limited numbers and tends to be more expensive than the others.

Ricoh GR film cameras
Name	Image	Rel.	Lens			Dimensions					Shutter speed (sec.)	Exposure modes
Name	Image	Rel.	F.L.	Max. aperture	Constr.	W	H	D	D (grip)	Wgt.	Shutter speed (sec.)	Exposure modes
GR1	Ricoh GR1 with case	Oct 1996	28 mm	f/2.8	7e/4g	117 mm (4.6 in)	61 mm (2.4 in)	26.5 mm (1.0 in)	34 mm (1.3 in)	175–177 g (6.2–6.2 oz)	2–1/500	P,A (ISO 25–3200)
GR10		Apr 1998	28 mm	f/2.8	7e/4g	118 mm (4.6 in)	61 mm (2.4 in)	26.5 mm (1.0 in)	35 mm (1.4 in)	170 g (6.0 oz)	2–1/500	P (ISO 50–3200)
GR1s		Apr 1998	28 mm	f/2.8	7e/4g	117 mm (4.6 in)	61 mm (2.4 in)	26.5 mm (1.0 in)	34 mm (1.3 in)	178–180 g (6.3–6.3 oz)	2–1/500	P,A (ISO 25–3200)
GR21		Apr 2001	21 mm	f/3.5	9e/6g	117 mm (4.6 in)	64 mm (2.5 in)	26.5 mm (1.0 in)	38.5 mm (1.5 in)	200 g (7.1 oz)	2–1/500	P,A (ISO 25–3200)
GR1v		Sep 2001	28 mm	f/2.8	7e/4g	117 mm (4.6 in)	61 mm (2.4 in)	26.5 mm (1.0 in)	34 mm (1.3 in)	178–180 g (6.3–6.3 oz)	2–1/500	P,A (ISO 25–3200)

== See also ==
- Contax T – premium compact AF 35 mm and APS film and digital cameras
- Konica Hexar – premium compact AF 35 mm film cameras
- Leica minilux – premium compact AF 35 mm film cameras
- Minolta TC-1 – premium compact AF 35 mm film camera
- Nikon 35Ti/28Ti – premium compact AF 35 mm film cameras
- Olympus XA – small rangefinder 35 mm film cameras
- Rollei QZ 35W/35T – premium compact AF 35 mm film cameras
