= Contax T =

Japanese line of cameras

The Contax T is a line of compact film cameras made by Kyocera for their Contax brand from 1984 through 2002. The T, T2, and T3 models use 35 mm film and have a fixed 35 mm wide-angle lens. The T-VS, T-VS II, and T-VS III also use 35 mm film but have a 28–56 mm lens. The Tix uses APS film and has a fixed 28 mm wide-angle lens. The TVS Digital is a 5 MP digital camera with a 35–105 mm (equivalent) lens.

In 2005, Kyocera sold its camera business to Cosina and announced it would cease all activity related to the manufacture of Contax cameras at the end of the year.

== Contax T-series cameras ==
A 35 mm film, compact rangefinder camera with a titanium body and Carl Zeiss Sonnar T* 38 mm f/2.8 wide-angle lens.

- Contax T – with 5-element Carl Zeiss Sonnar T* 38 mm manual focus lens (made by Yashica, which was owned by Kyocera, in partnership with Carl Zeiss). Introduced in 1984. Includes a dedicated separate clip-on auto flash (A14).
- Contax T2 – with a retracting 5-element Carl Zeiss Sonnar T* 38 mm active autofocus and manual focus lens, made in silver titanium, in black and gold plated finish; 1/500 s max shutter speed. Introduced in 1991. Includes a built-in auto flash.
- Contax T3 – smaller than the T2 and with recomputed 6-element (sharper) Carl Zeiss Sonnar T* 35 mm passive autofocus and manual focus lens; 1/1200 s max shutter speed; autofocus lock. Includes a built-in auto flash.
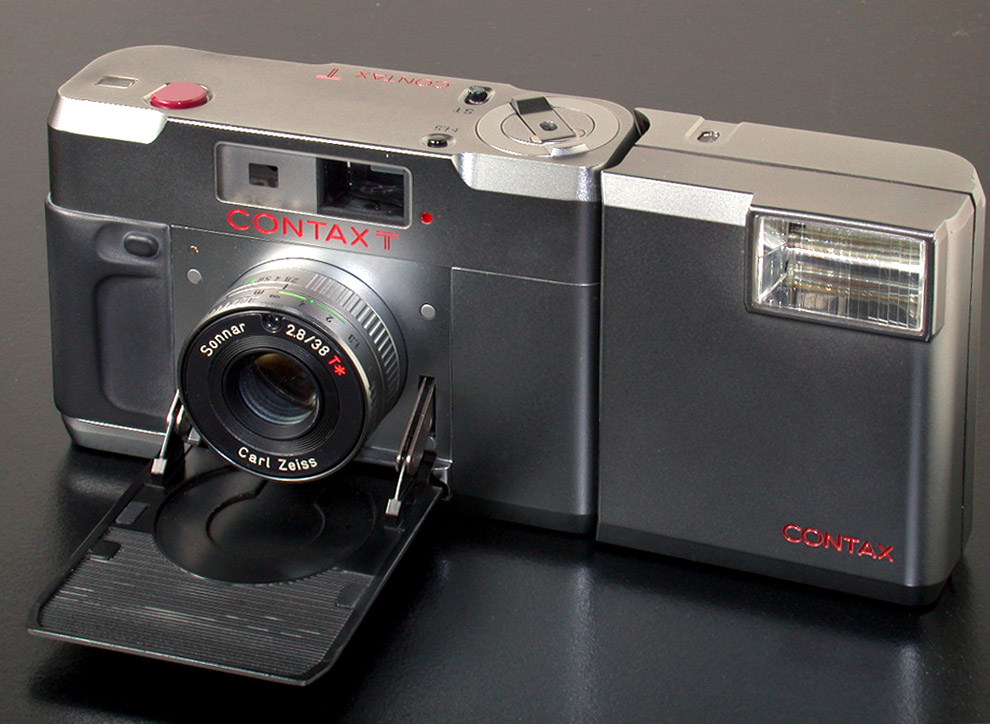
Contax T with A14 flash

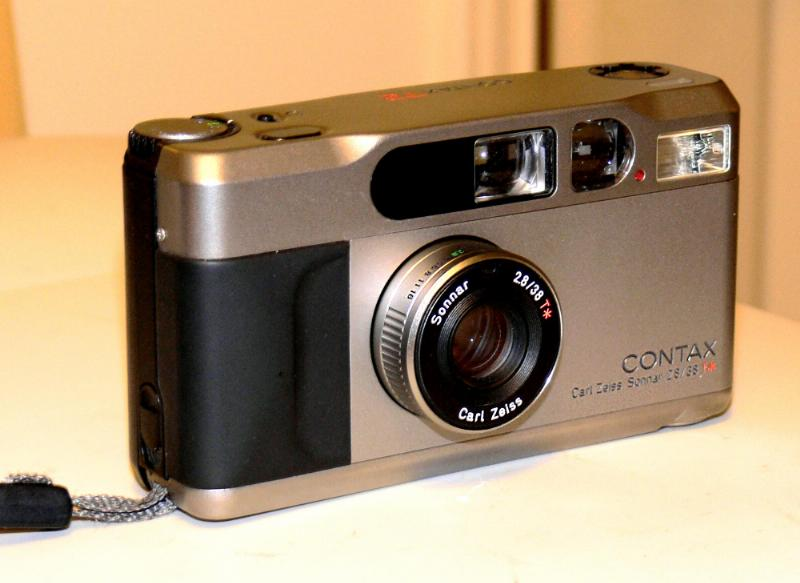
Contax T2, silver titanium finish

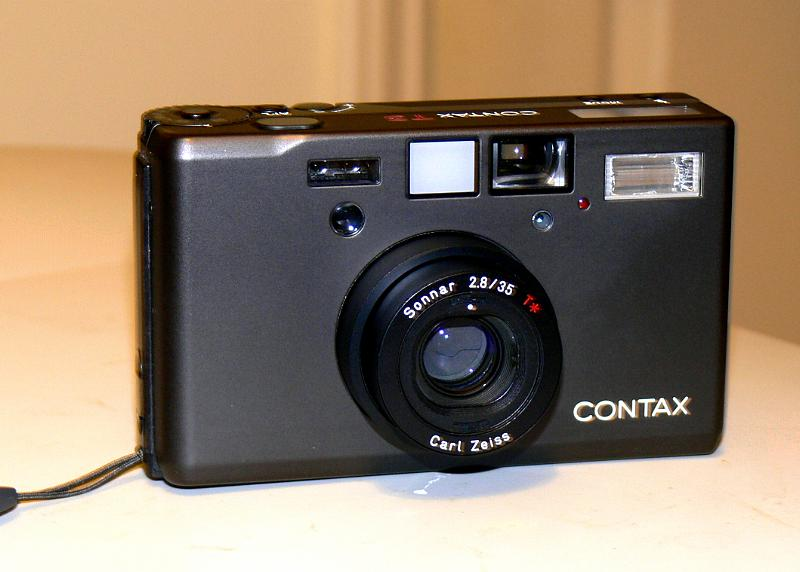
Contax T3, black titanium finish

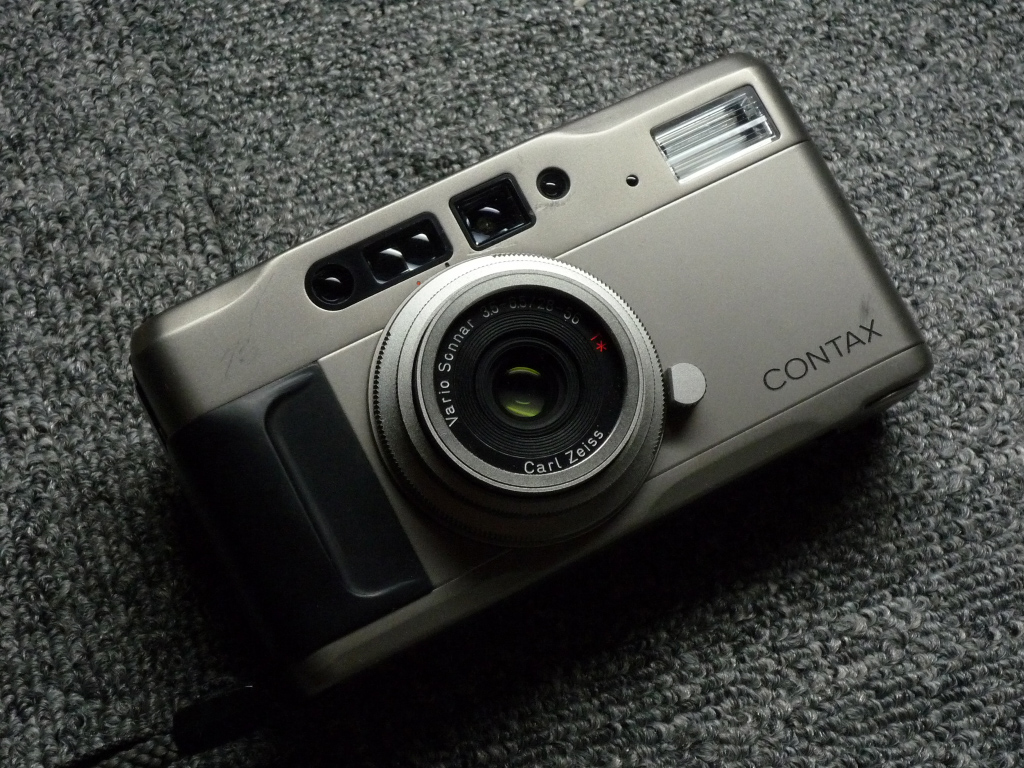
Contax T-VS

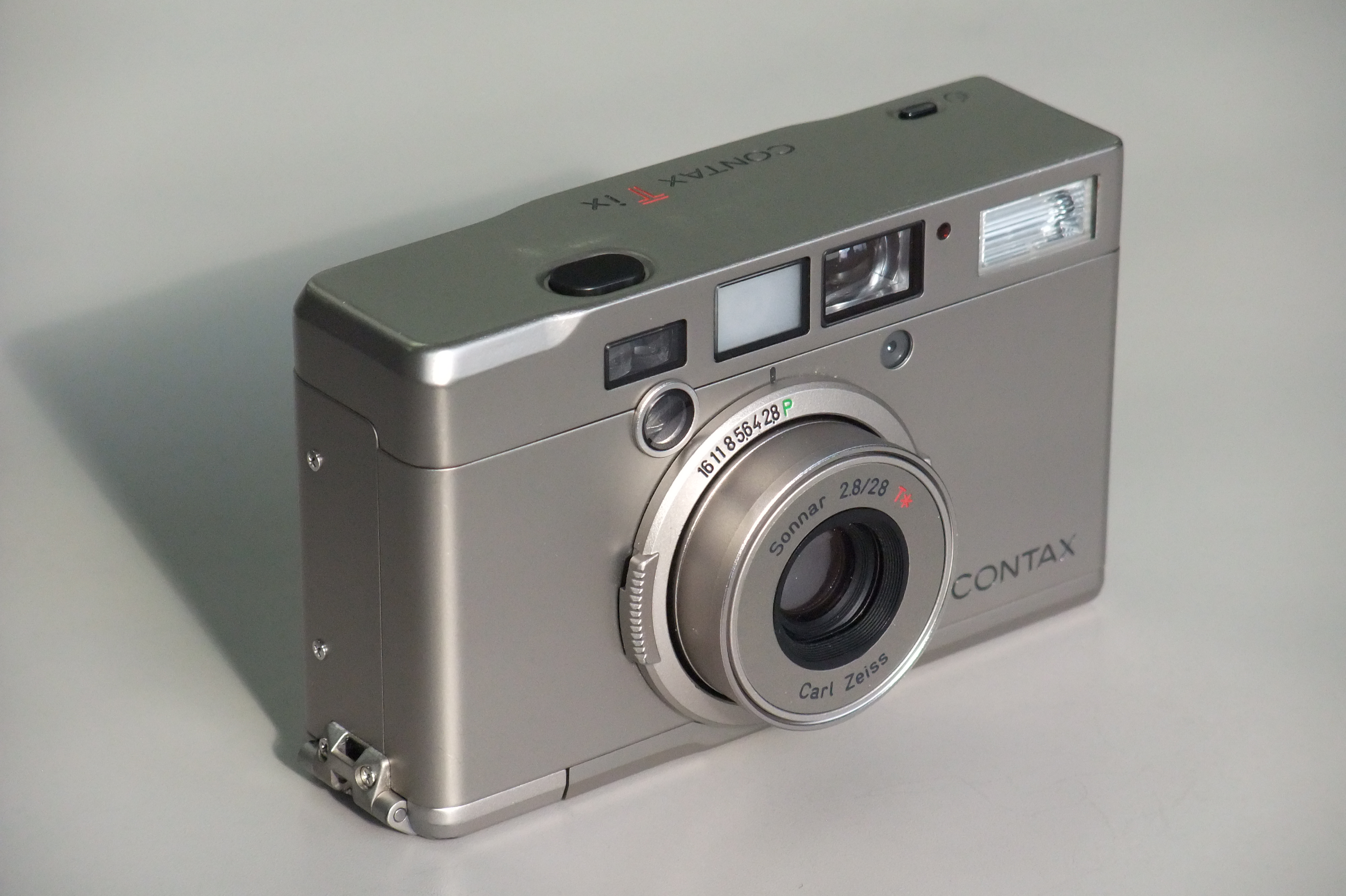
Contax Tix

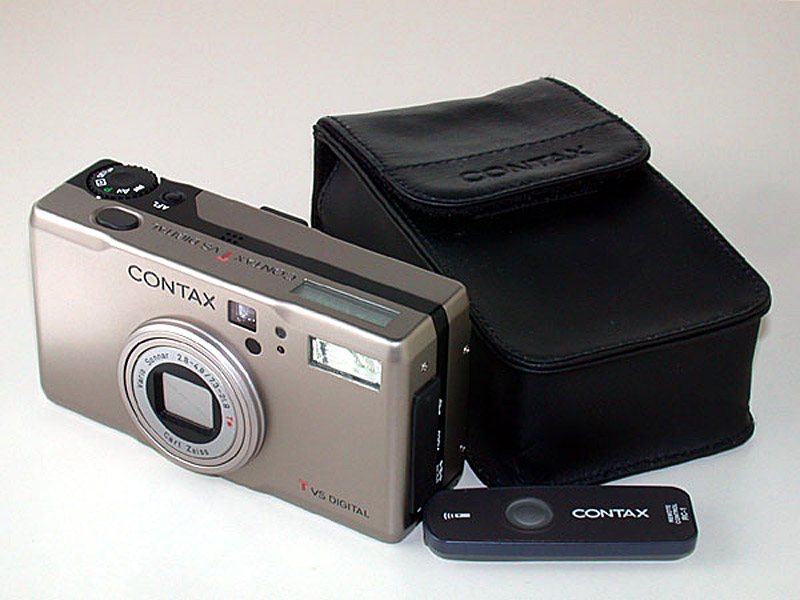
Contax T-VS Digital

== Contax TVS-series cameras ==
A 35 mm film, compact rangefinder camera with a titanium body. TVS stands for T* Vario-Sonnar for its Carl Zeiss T* Vario-Sonnar lens.

- Contax T-VS – 28–56 mm lens with variable stops f/3.5–f/6.5; passive phase detection autofocus
- Contax T-VS II – 28–56 mm lens with variable stops f/3.5–f/6.5
- Contax T-VS III – lens has 5 variable stops (30 mm, 37.5 mm, 45 mm, 52.5 mm and 60 mm) f/3.7–f/6.7; has a Contax T-style front door cover

== Contax Tix camera ==
- Contax Tix (i.e. T4) – an APS film camera with a Carl Zeiss Sonnar T* 28 mm f/2.8 autofocus lens. Introduced in 1997.

== Contax TVS Digital ==
- Contax TVS Digital – 5 MP digital compact camera with a Carl Zeiss T* Vario-Sonnar 35–105 mm f/2.8–f/4.8 (35 mm equivalent) lens. Introduced in 2002.

== See also ==
- Konica Hexar – premium compact AF 35 mm film cameras
- Leica minilux – premium compact AF 35 mm film cameras
- Minolta TC-1 – premium compact AF 35 mm film camera
- Nikon 35Ti/28Ti – premium compact AF 35 mm film cameras
- Olympus XA – another small rangefinder 35 mm film camera
- Ricoh GR series – premium compact AF 35 mm film cameras
- Rollei QZ 35W/35T – premium compact AF 35 mm film cameras
