= Tc-1 =

TC-1 might refer to:

- Minolta TC-1, a 35 mm camera
- TC-1, the equatorial satellite used in the Double Star mission
- TC-1, Tien Chien 1, a Taiwanese anti-aircraft missile Sky Sword
