= Leica minilux =

35mm point and shoot camera line

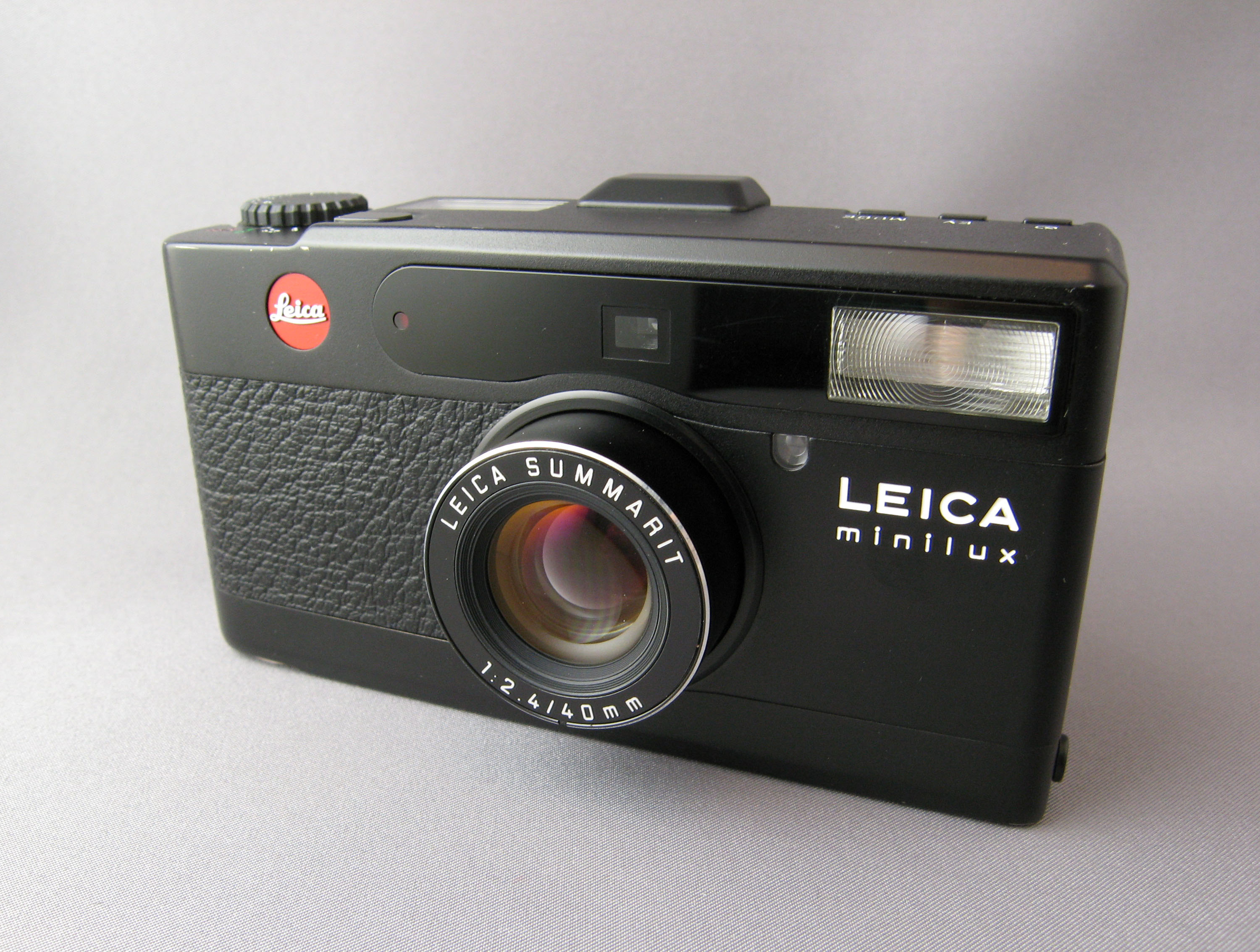
- Leica minilux (black finish)

Overview
- Type: 35mm point and shoot

Lens
- Lens mount: fixed
- Lens: f=40 mm (minilux & CM) or 35~70 mm (minilux zoom)
- F-numbers: f/2.4–22 (minilux & CM) or f/3.5~6.5–22 (zoom)

Sensor/medium
- Film format: 35mm
- Film speed detection: ISO 25–5000, 1/3 steps

Focusing
- Focus: 2 ft 4 in (0.71 m) min.
- Focus modes: automatic, 180 steps; manual (scale)

Exposure/metering
- Exposure modes: Program or Aperture-priority, ±2 EV in 1/2 steps
- Metering modes: center-weighted

Flash
- Flash: Built-in, GN 24 (ft, ISO 100)

Shutter
- Shutter speed range: 1–1/400 sec + B

General
- Battery: 1×CR123A
- Dimensions: 4 7/8 in × 2 5/8 in × 1 1/2 in (124 mm × 67 mm × 38 mm) [minilux]
- Weight: 12 1/4 oz (350 g) with battery

The Leica minilux is the first in a series of four luxury titanium-clad point and shoot cameras that were produced by Leica Camera starting from 1995; it is equipped with a high-quality lens and body to compete with similar premium compact cameras produced during the Japanese bubble-economy era, including the Contax T line, Konica Hexar, Nikon 28Ti/35Ti, Minolta TC-1, Ricoh GR series, and Rollei QZ 35W/35T. All of the cameras in the minilux series, including the original minilux (released in 1995), Leica minilux zoom (1998), Leica CM (2004), and Leica CM ZOOM (also 2004) used 35 mm film; the minilux and CM were equipped with the same Leica Summarit lens (f=40 mm f/2.4), while the minilux zoom and CM Zoom were equipped with a Vario-Elmar lens (f=35~70 mm f/3.5~6.5).

== Models ==
=== minilux ===
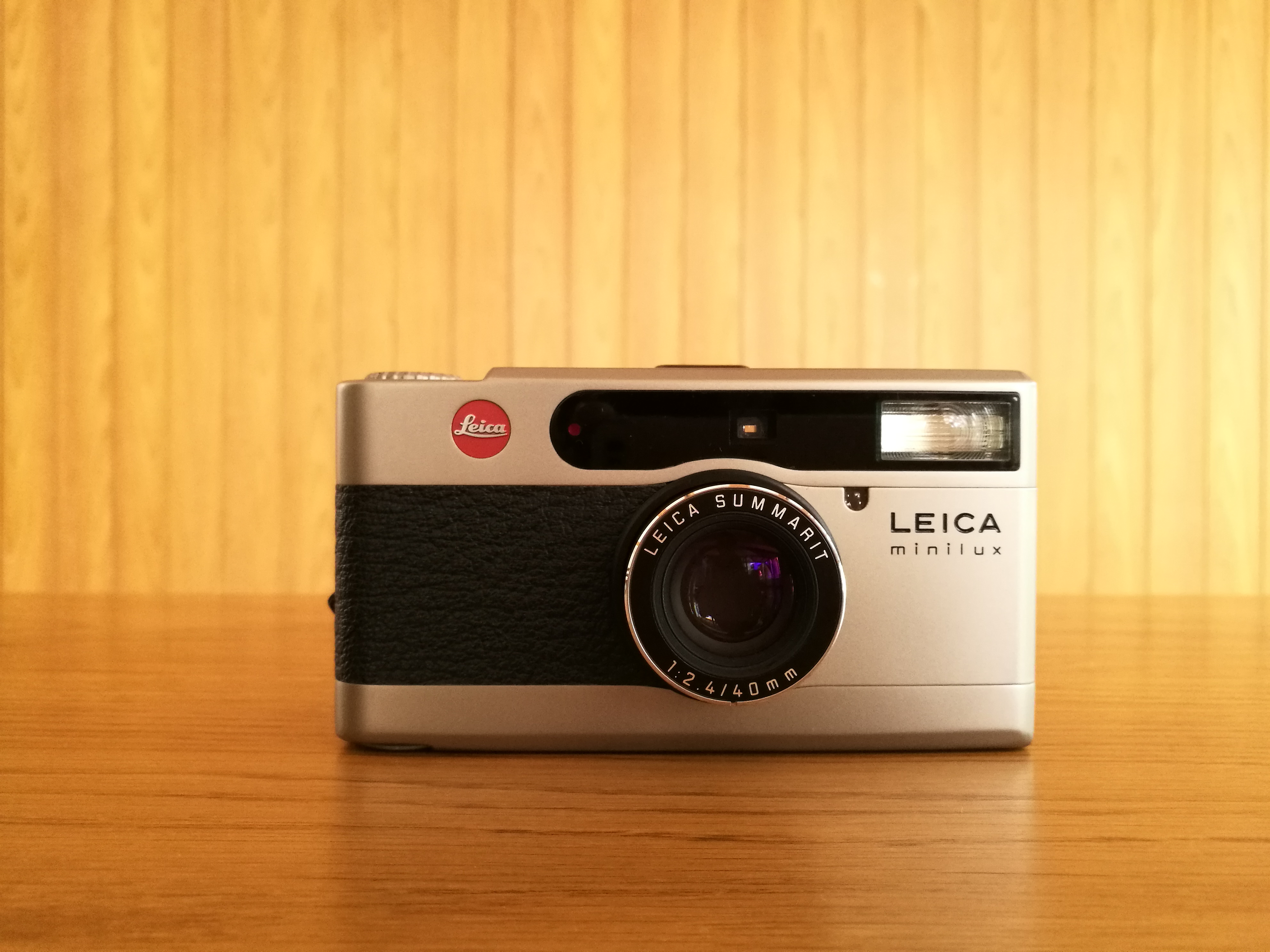
Leica minilux (natural chrome/silver finish)

When the Leica minilux was released in 1995, it was compared to the earlier Contax T2 and Nikon 35Ti; all three were autofocus, titanium-clad point and shoot cameras marketed at a premium price point and made in Japan. Previously, Leica had released rebadged Minolta compact cameras for the point and shoot market, including the AF-C1 (a rebadged AF-Tele Super) in 1989. The minilux was developed in partnership with Panasonic Corporation. A remote-release socket is provided on the front of the camera, an unusual feature for a compact.

The minilux has been criticized for its small viewfinder size; the magnification of the minilux is 0.35× and the viewfinder covers approximately 85% of the frame; the minilux zoom has similar magnification and coverage.

A quartz date/time imprinting function is optional.

Leica released several limited production variants, including a Tintin-themed version (1997), a version finished in black lacquer (1998), and a "DB exclusive" (2002) version in silver/chrome titanium finish with snakeskin leather.

As the camera ages, the flexible printed circuit connecting the lens aperture control can break, rendering the camera unusable. This is indicated by an "E02" error message displayed on the top-deck LCD. Replacement of this flex cable is possible, but requires extensive disassembly.

=== minilux zoom ===
The minilux zoom drops the aperture-priority autoexposure mode, offering program autoexposure with shift instead. The lower coaxial control dial, which selects the autoexposure mode and aperture for the minilux, controls the zoom function instead for the minilux zoom.

In addition to the zoom lens, the major added feature of the minilux zoom was an ISO hot shoe. Leica marketed the optional CF flash unit for the minilux zoom, which has a guide number of 20 (m, ISO 100), nearly doubling the camera's internal flash output. The camera suppresses the internal flash and assumes a guide number of 20 m, setting the aperture automatically based on the distance to the subject, which requires some workarounds when using an external flash from other manufacturers.

Pope John Paul II was presented with a minilux zoom in 1999. Also that year, a minilux zoom with black lacquer finish was available as part of a limited "Bogner" set.

=== CM and CM Zoom ===
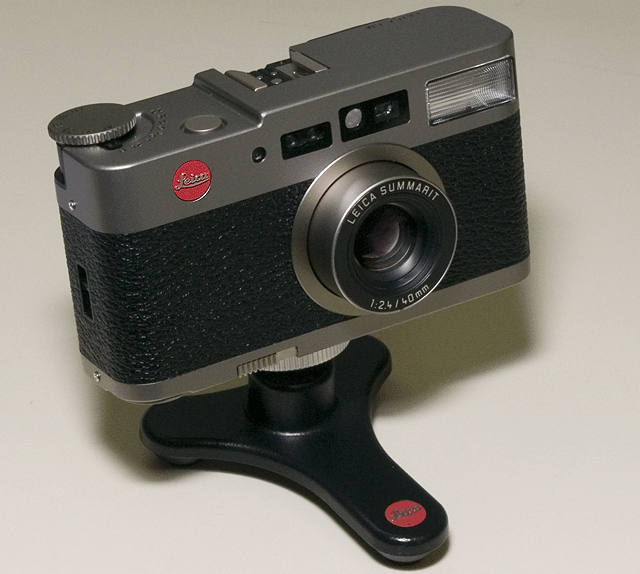
Leica CM

The Leica minilux was restyled to resemble a Leica M-series rangefinder and released as the CM in 2004; production was moved to Germany. The fastest shutter speed was extended to 1/1000 sec. Compared to the minilux, the CM moves the LCD status display to the back of the camera; the hot shoe was retained from the minilux zoom and was made compatible with the Metz Mecablitz SCA 3000 system. The matching flash is now the Leica SF 24D, shared with contemporary Leica M- and R-series cameras.

The CM Zoom similarly is derived from the minilux zoom; the CM Zoom also drops the aperture-priority autoexposure mode compared to the minilux and standard CM.

=== Catalog numbers ===
- 18 006: minilux (titanium)
- 18 009: minilux (black lacquer)
- 18 036: minilux zoom

== Lenses ==
The Summarit lens fitted to the minilux and CM is a symmetric lens with six elements in four groups. According to Leica, the CM version of the Summarit has "improved coatings".

Erwin Puts describes "the overall fingerprint of the [minilux/CM] Summarit [as] close to that of the seminal Summicron 2/35 ASPH and I suspect that the Summarit is the best of its kind given current knowledge ... the Summarit ... would be worth of being fitted to the M-body." The main fault found was vignetting of two stops when wide-open. Summarit lenses have been removed from unusable minilux cameras and remounted for use with Leica M rangefinders.

The minilux zoom and CM Zoom have a seven-element, six-group Vario-Elmar lens with a 2:1 zoom ratio.

== Operation ==
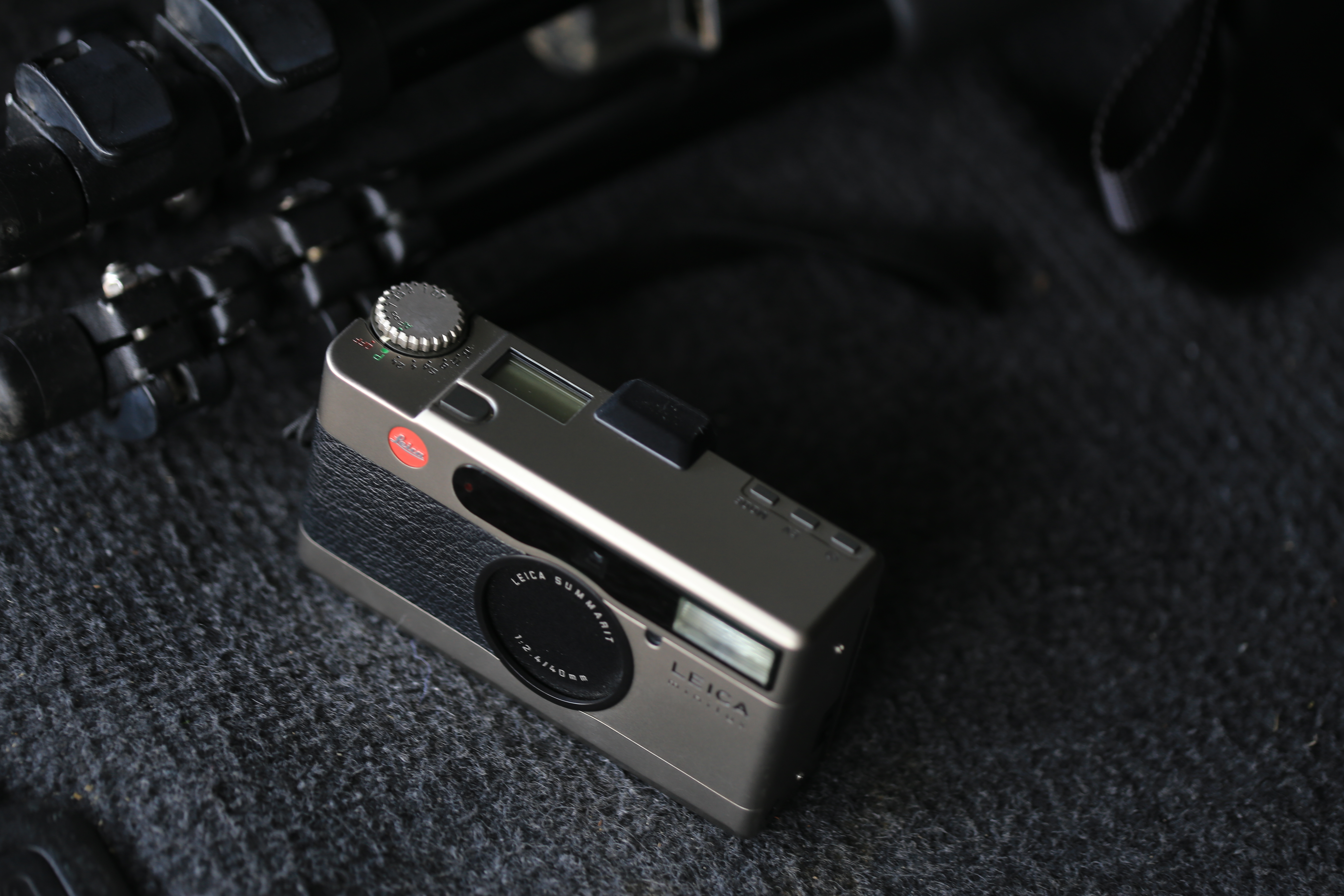
minilux top deck

Most of the camera's controls are on the top deck, including coaxial knurled knobs for the right thumb, which control focus distance and autoexposure mode (or aperture selection). The shutter release and a small LCD status display are next to these knobs. On the left side are buttons that control the self-timer, EV compensation, and operating mode.

Dan Richards, writing for Popular Photography in 1995, noted the mode button cycles through eight different combinations of flash operation and (B)ulb shutter operation and said "a separate button for redeye reduction would have reduced button pokes nearly by half". When the camera is turned off, the flash mode resets to default.
