= Nikon Ti cameras =

35mm point and shoot camera

Nikon 35Ti / 28Ti
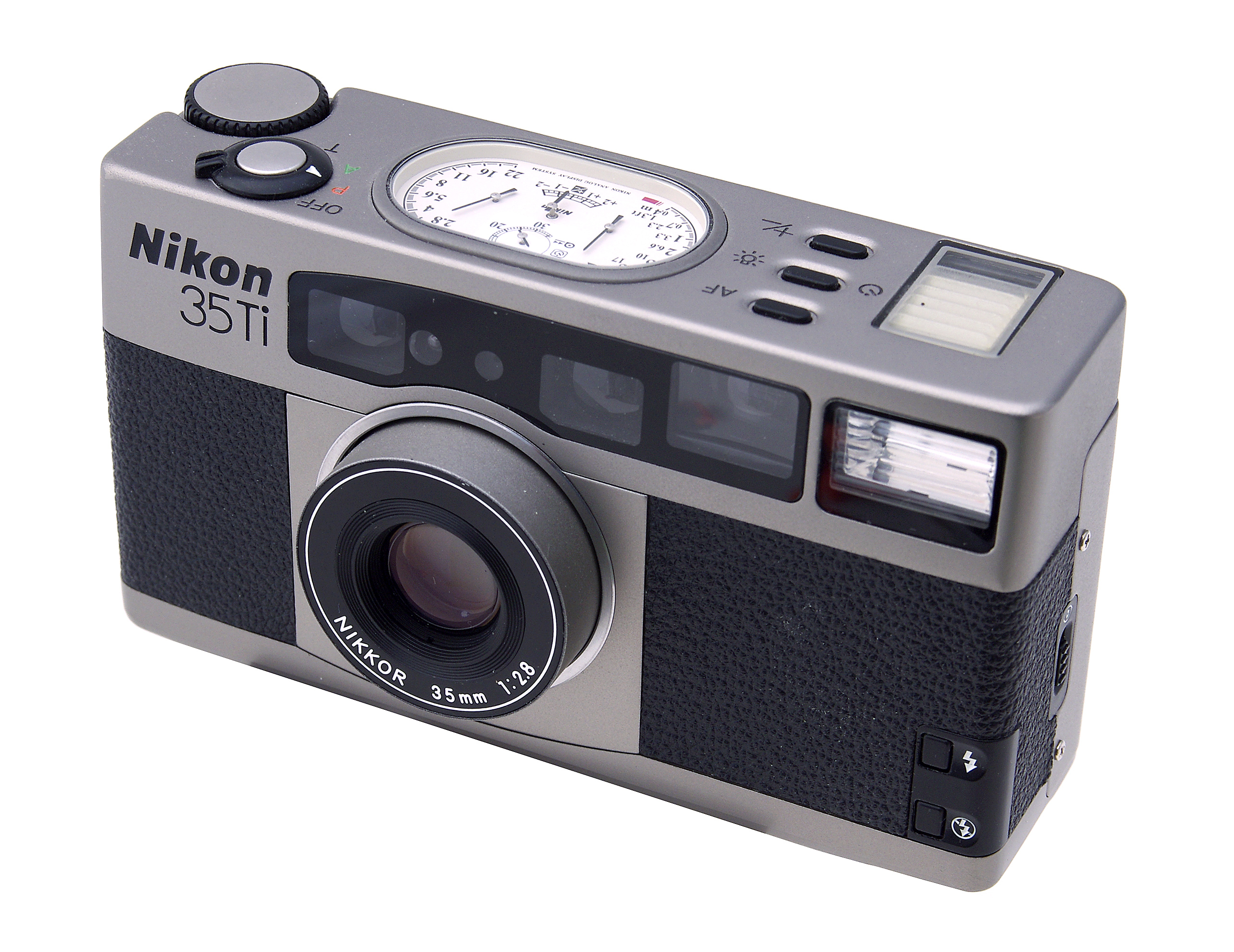
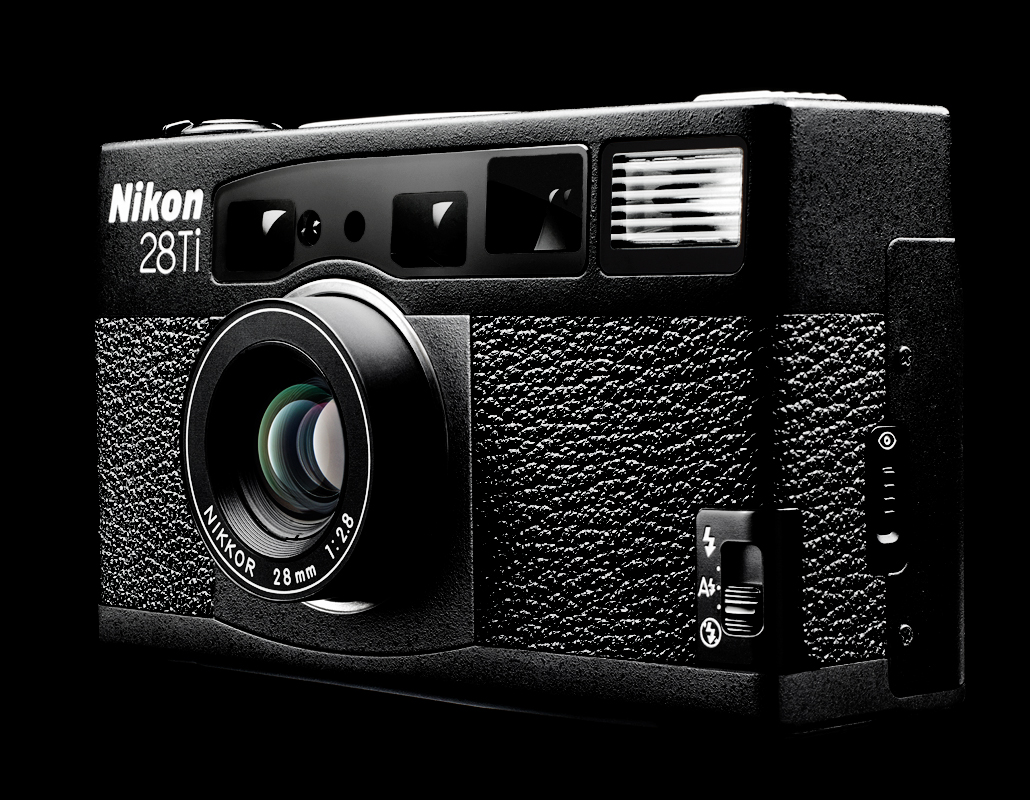
- 35Ti (top) and 28Ti (bottom)

Overview
- Type: 35mm point and shoot

Lens
- Lens mount: fixed
- Lens: f=35 mm (35Ti) or 28 mm (28Ti)
- F-numbers: f/2.8–22

Sensor/medium
- Film format: 35mm
- Film speed detection: ISO 25–5000, 1/3 steps

Focusing
- Focus: 1 ft 4 in (0.41 m) min.
- Focus modes: automatic, 833 steps; manual

Exposure/metering
- Exposure modes: Program or Aperture-priority, ±2 EV in 1/2 steps
- Metering modes: 6-segment matrix or 75/25 center-weighted

Flash
- Flash: Built-in, GN 11 (ft, ISO 100)

Shutter
- Shutter speed range: 2–1/500 sec + T (up to 10 min.)

General
- Battery: 1×CR123A
- Dimensions: 4 5/8 in × 2 5/8 in × 1 7/16 in (117 mm × 67 mm × 37 mm)
- Weight: 11 3/4 oz (330 g) with battery

The Nikon 35Ti (1993) and Nikon 28Ti (1994) are luxury titanium-clad point and shoot cameras that were produced by Nikon, equipped with a high-quality lens and body, competing with similar luxury compact cameras produced during the Japanese bubble-economy era, including the Contax T line, Konica Hexar, Leica minilux, Minolta TC-1, Ricoh GR series, and Rollei QZ 35W/35T. Both the 35Ti and 28Ti are 35 mm cameras with nearly identical operation; as the name implies, the 35Ti is equipped with a 35 mm focal length lens, while the 28Ti is equipped with a 28 mm lens. Externally, they may be distinguished by their color: the 35Ti is finished in chrome/silver, and the 28Ti is finished in black.

== Design ==
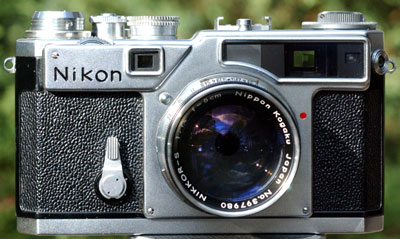
Nikon SP rangefinder

The camera chassis is reinforced polycarbonate fitted in a titanium shell; the lens barrel, focusing helicoid, and film guide rails are made of aluminum. When it was noted the design bore similarities to the Nikon S-series rangefinder cameras released in the 1950s, a Nikon spokesman commented "The designers of [the 35Ti] are somewhat younger than the designers of the S2."

The viewfinder incorporates an aspheric lens to minimize distortion and the illuminated framelines are displayed via a projected LCD. Illumination for the framelines is provided by a translucent window above the flash on the camera's top deck, or by bulb when there is insufficient light. A crop-frame panorama function is provided for the 35Ti and the 28Ti, although the custom function to suppress the panorama frame has been removed from the 28Ti.

Both cameras are equipped with quartz date/time imprinting functions. Data can be imprinted on either each frame, on the frame just before exposures begin, or on the first frame of the day.

=== Lens ===
The 35Ti is fitted with a symmetric lens with six elements in four groups, using "low-dispersion glass". The 28Ti also uses "low-dispersion glass" for its seven-element lens. Nikon state the lens designs are derived from the "symmetrical wideangle lens" designed by Zenji Wakimoto in the 1950s.

In a comparison published in Popular Photography with the Konica Hexar and Contax T2, Dan Richards wrote "the nod for optical quality has to go to the Nikon 35Ti. As we've noted before, it isn't just that the lens is sharp, but that it has very well-balanced performance—unnoticeable distortion, very little light falloff, exceptional control of flare." He also praised the lens as "an SLR-quality optic, and a good SLR optic at that"; when the 28Ti was released, he noted it was equipped with "another killer compact optic ... this would rank with a very good single-focal-length SLR lens."

== Operation ==
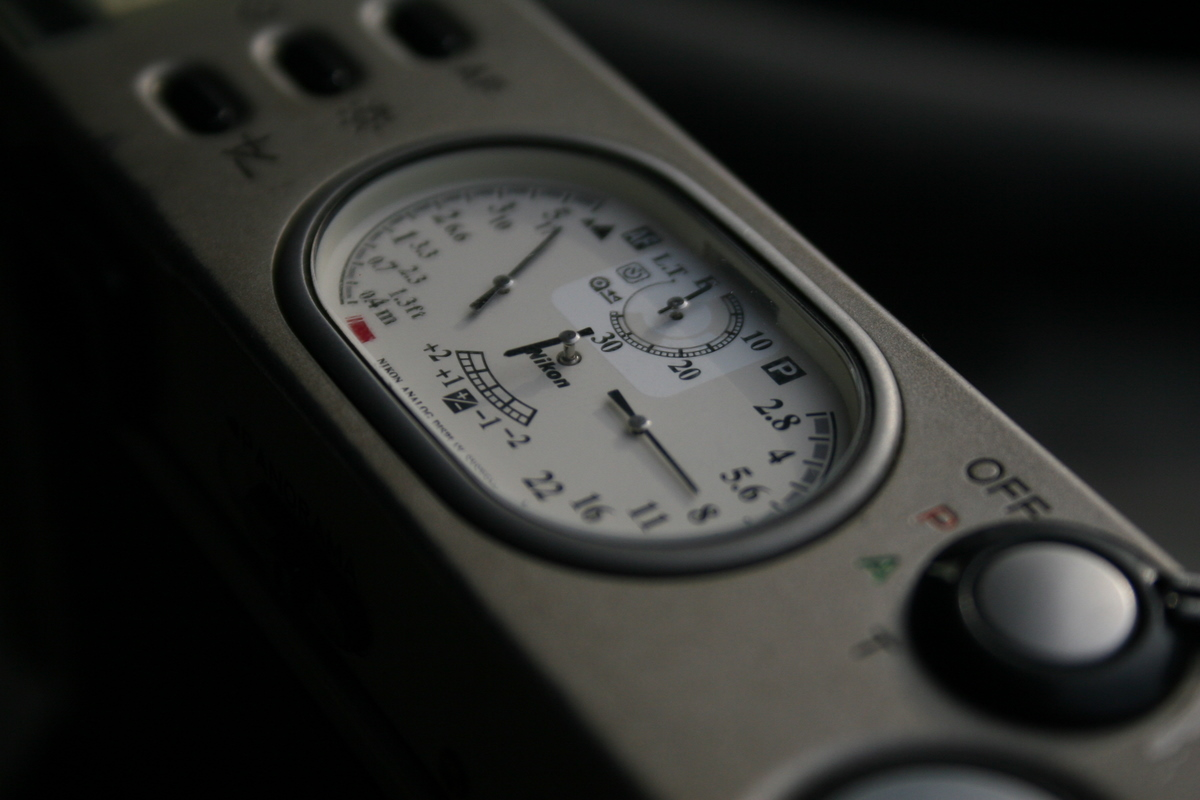
Analog display gauge on 35Ti

Nikon 35Ti/28Ti custom function settings
Code	Setting
00 0 00	Set custom functions
00 0 01	All custom functions off
01 1 00	Normal mode: Autoflash
01 1 01	Normal mode: Flash off
01 2 00	Matrix metering
01 2 01	Centerweighted metering
01 3 00	Display shutter speeds in viewfinder
01 3 01	Display apertures in viewfinder
01 4 00	Data imprints all frames
01 4 01	Data imprints selected frames
02 0 00	Allows re-zeroing of misaligned gauge needles
02 0 01	Allows re-zeroing of misaligned gauge needles
03 0 00	Display panorama frame
03 0 01	Suppress panorama frame

The top panel has a combination analog gauge display that indicates the focusing distance (left), aperture (right), frame number (top), and exposure compensation (bottom). A collar around the shutter release switches the metering mode from (P)rogram to (A)perture-priority and manual (T)ime exposure. A thumbwheel for the right hand, located behind the shutter release on the top deck, allows selection of focus distance in manual focus mode, aperture in aperture-priority autoexposure, or program shift.

The primary control change with the 28Ti was moving to a slider switch to select flash mode, instead of the pushbuttons of the 35Ti, which were noted as being "more characteristic of low-end point-and-shoots".
