= Minolta TC-1 =

35mm point and shoot camera

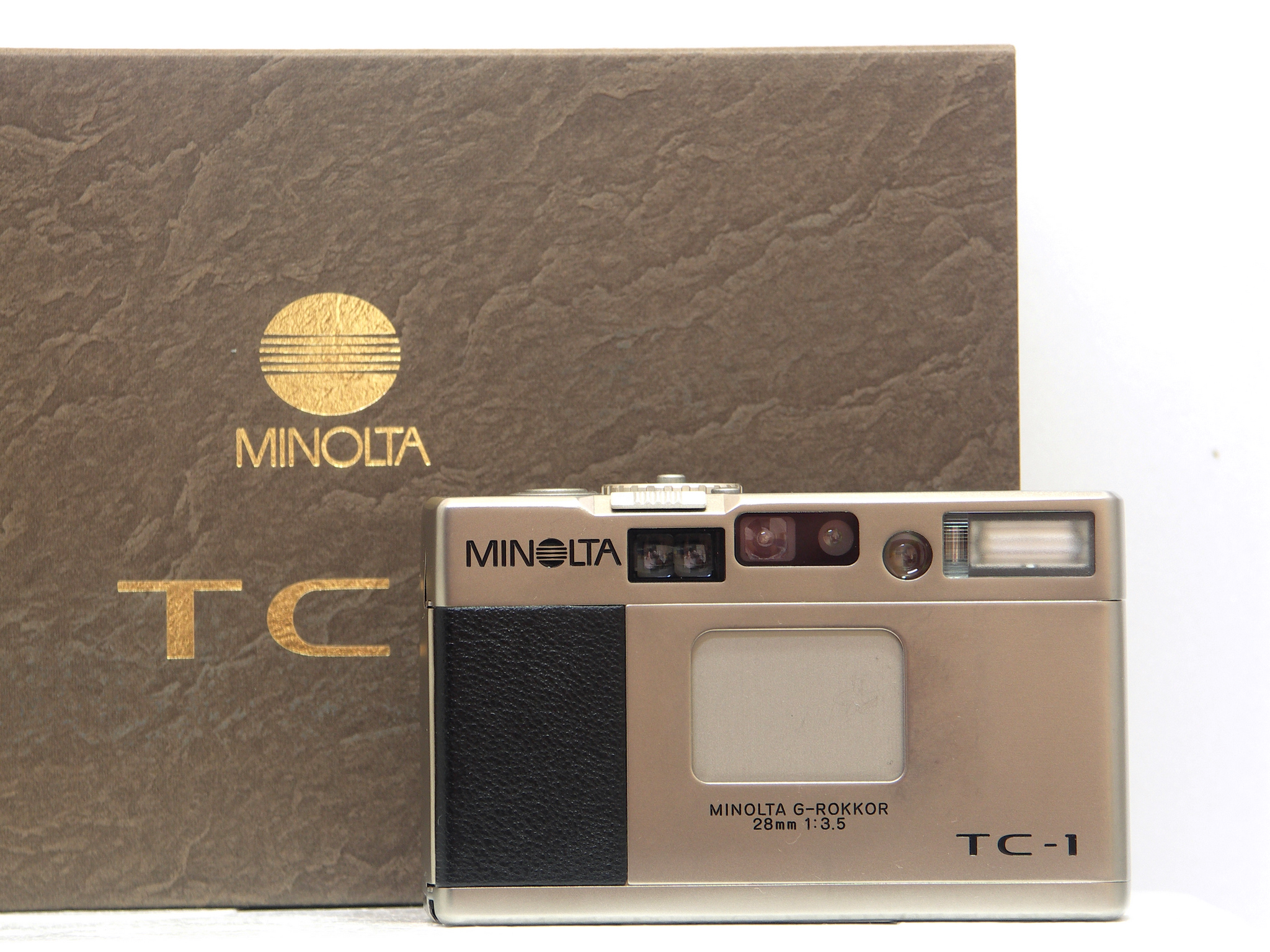

Overview
- Maker: Minolta
- Type: 35mm point and shoot

Lens
- Lens mount: fixed
- Lens: f=28 mm · 5 glass elements in 5 groups · 2 elements with 3 aspheric surfaces
- F-numbers: f/3.5–16, whole stops

Sensor/medium
- Film format: 35mm
- Film speed: ISO 6–6400, 1/3 steps
- Film speed detection: ISO 25–3200

Focusing
- Focus: 1 1/2 ft (0.46 m) min.
- Focus modes: automatic, 455 steps; manual, 22 steps

Exposure/metering
- Exposure modes: Aperture-priority, ±4 EV in 1/2 steps
- Metering modes: center-weighted, spot

Flash
- Flash: Built-in, GN 7 (m, ISO 100)

Shutter
- Shutter speed range: 8–1/750 sec (1/500 at f/16)

General
- Battery: 1×CR123A
- Dimensions: 3 7/8 in × 2 3/8 in × 1 1/8 in (98 mm × 60 mm × 29 mm)
- Weight: 7 1/8 oz (200 g) with battery

TC-1 is a luxury point and shoot camera that was produced by Minolta. It is a compact 35 mm clad in titanium, equipped with a G-Rokkor 28mm f/3.5 lens. The TC-1 was equipped with a high quality lens and body, similar to other luxury compacts produced during the Japanese bubble economy era, including the Contax T line, Konica Hexar, Leica minilux, Nikon 28/35Ti, Ricoh GR series, and Rollei QZ 35W/35T. Expensive when initially released in 1996 with a suggested retail price of ¥148,000 (equivalent to ¥167,304 in 2024), it was produced in small numbers and since then has become collectible.

== Design ==
According to Minolta, development of the TC-1 began when an engineer questioned why SLRs were too bulky to carry day-to-day, but compact cameras sacrificed image quality. It took experienced technicians 45 minutes to assemble a single camera by hand, as the 150+ delicate, miniaturized parts used were not suited for a high-volume assembly line. The outer shell is made of titanium, which gave the camera its name ("Titanium Clad"). It is approximately the same volume as three 35mm film cartridges.

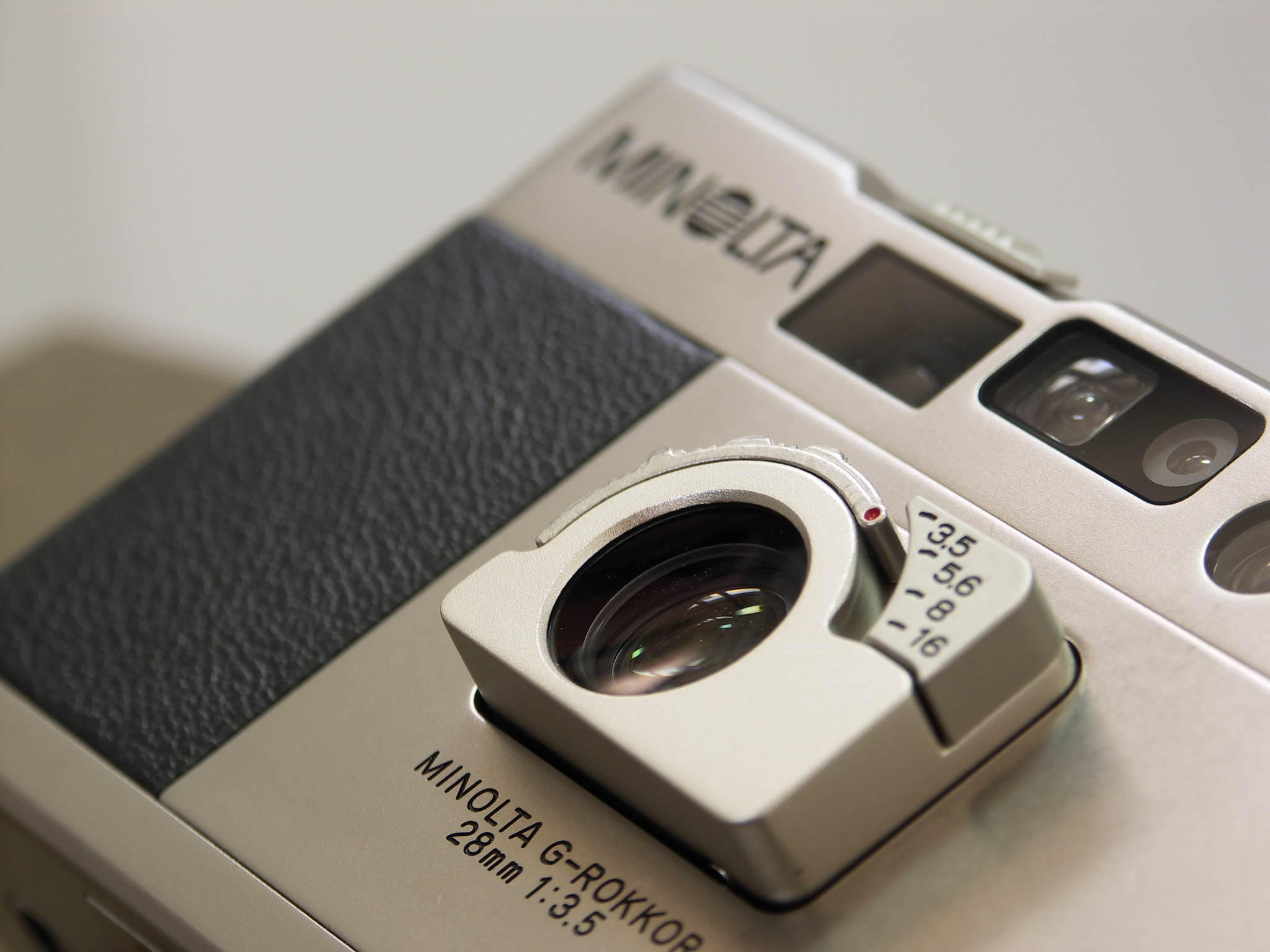
Lens and aperture selection slider

The camera operates in aperture-priority autoexposure, with four selectable aperture settings of f/3.5, 5.6, 8, or 16. Exposure compensation of up to ±4 EV is possible in 1/2 EV steps. One uncommon feature is the diaphragm, which used discrete circular Waterhouse stops rather than a iris with multiple diaphragm blades. It has received praise for its bokeh (out-of-focus characteristics).

In 1996, the Camera Journal Press Club of Japan awarded the TC-1 with the Camera Grand Prix. A special edition for the Japanese domestic market, finished in black, was built to celebrate Minolta's 70th anniversary in 1998 and limited to 2500 examples. As part of the same anniversary, 2000 examples of the G-Rokkor lens from the TC-1 were sold as a limited-production interchangeable lens in M39 lens mount; unlike the TC-1, the M39 version of the G-Rokkor was equipped with a 9-blade iris diaphragm, offering the additional aperture settings of f/4, 11, and 22. All versions of the TC-1 were discontinued by 2007 and has become collectible since then.

== Operation ==
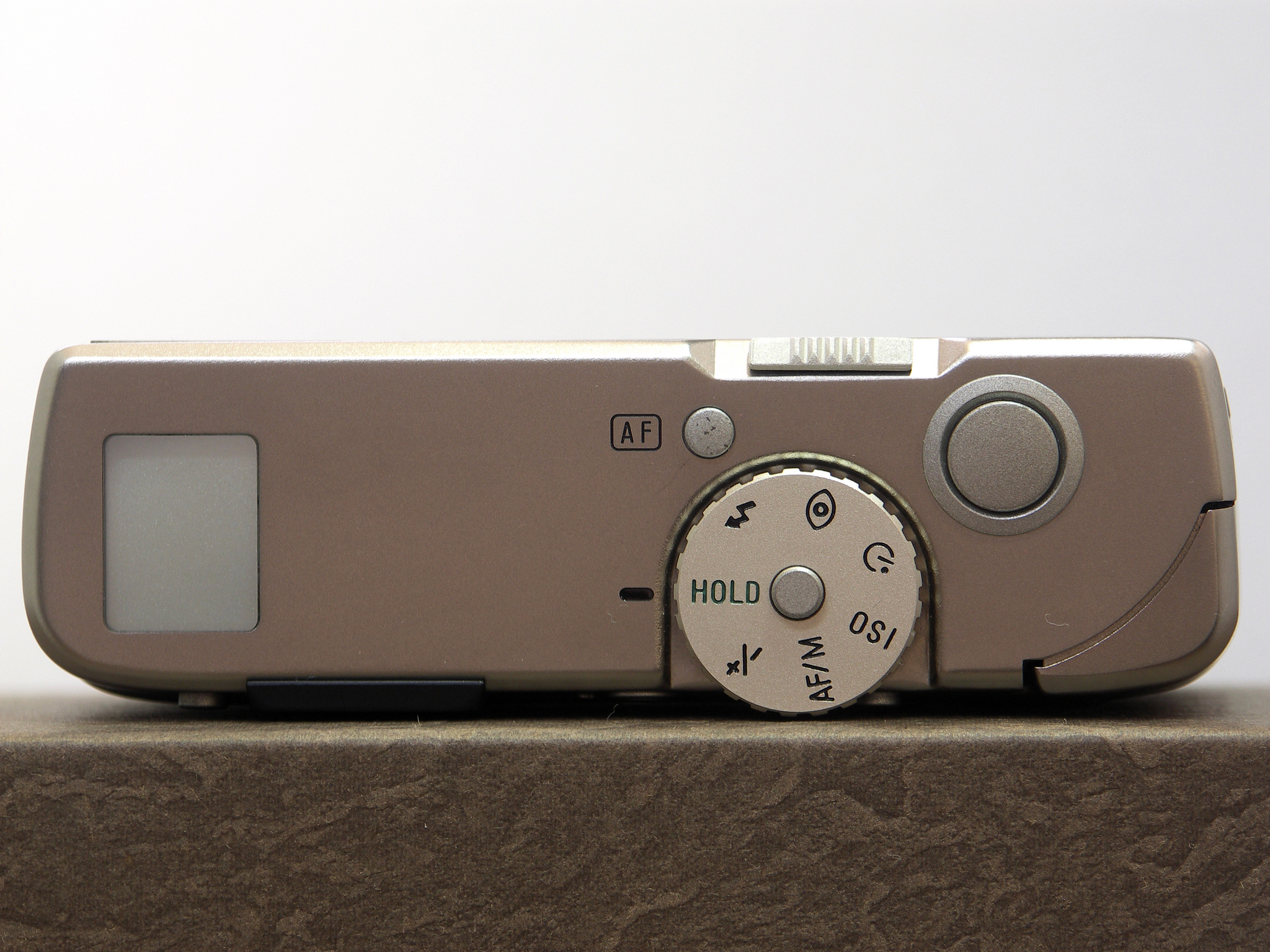
Top panel of Minolta TC-1

The TC-1 controls and display are provided on the top panel, with the exception of the aperture selector lever, which is on the lens. A small leather patch on the front of the camera facilitates grip by the right hand.

The button furthest to the right, when the camera is held by the photographer, is the shutter release. The photographer's right index finger is intended to select the aperture, then use the shutter release button.

On the front edge of the camera is a slider which adjusts settings according to the position of the control dial. When the dial is in "HOLD" position, it is locked and the central button is required to turn the dial to the appropriate manual control. Moving clockwise from "HOLD", the camera provides controls for flash mode (on / off / "night-portrait" or fill), red-eye reduction, self timer (2 and 10 seconds), ISO (manual film speed), autofocus / manual focus distance, and exposure compensation. A button on the top edge of the rear panel, just under the control dial, engages the spot meter.

The button between the setting adjustment slider and dial resets the focus mode to autofocus.

On the left edge of the camera, a backlit LCD provides feedback on settings while they are being adjusted. Illumination is turned on by a button just below the display on the top edge of the camera's back.
