= Rollei QZ cameras =

35mm point and shoot camera line

Rollei QZ 35W / 35T
Overview
- Type: 35mm point and shoot

Lens
- Lens mount: fixed
- Lens: f=28~60 mm (35W) or 38~90 mm (35T)
- F-numbers: f/2.8~5.6–22

Sensor/medium
- Film format: 35mm
- Film speed: ISO 6–6400, 1/3 steps
- Film speed detection: ISO 25–5000, default 100

Focusing
- Focus: 2 ft 4 in (0.71 m) min.
- Focus modes: automatic, 200 steps; manual (electronic rangefinder)

Exposure/metering
- Exposure modes: Program, Aperture-priority, Shutter-priority, or Manual; ±2 EV in 1/2 steps
- Metering modes: center-weighted, EV -1 to 22

Flash
- Flash: 20QF dedicated external unit, GN 65 (ft, ISO 100)

Shutter
- Frame rate: 1 fps
- Shutter speed range: 16–1/8000 sec + B (flash sync 1/180)

General
- Battery: 2×CR2
- Dimensions: 5.7 in × 3 in × 2.3 in (145 mm × 76 mm × 58 mm)
- Weight: 1 lb 8.6 oz (0.70 kg) with battery

The Rollei QZ 35W and 35T are luxury titanium-clad point and shoot cameras that were produced by Rollei starting from 1997; they are equipped with a high-quality Rollei VarioApogon lens and body to compete with similar premium compact cameras produced during the Japanese bubble-economy era, including the Contax T line, Konica Hexar, Leica minilux, Nikon 28Ti/35Ti, Minolta TC-1, and Ricoh GR series. Both of the cameras used 35 mm film; the 35W was equipped with a wide-angle zoom lens (28~60 mm), while the 35T was equipped with a standard to short telephoto zoom lens (38~90 mm).

== History ==
The cameras were developed in partnership with Samsung Aerospace Industries. Industrial design was performed by F. A. Porsche. They were featured in the Popular Science 1997 year-end feature "Best of What's New" and won an iF Product Design Award in 1998.

The 35T is more common than the 35W. Externally, the two cameras can be distinguished by the small colored square below the "Rollei" logo on the camera's front: the 35W has a blue-purple square, while the 35T has a dark magenta square instead.

== Lenses ==
The 35T and 35W lenses are both branded S-VarioApogon; both have 10 elements in 8 groups. Popular Photography raved about the "spectacular" lenses' performance: "they test out as good as, or better than, zooms or single-focal-length lenses from the ranking camera makers ... It's the lenses that will sell these cameras."

Zoom lens (Lee, 1994, from US 5,724,192)

The optical diagrams bear similarities to a wide-angle zoom lens patent filed in 1994 by Hae-Jin Lee and assigned to Samsung Aerospace Industries, Ltd.; that patent describes a slower, 11-element/8-group lens with greater zoom range, with focal length varying from 29~87 mm and a maximum aperture of f/3.8~10.25. Those specifications more closely match the lens fitted to the Rollei Prego 90 and Samsung Slim Zoom 290G.

== Operation ==
There are three control dials on the camera: aperture (coaxial with lens), shutter speed (right side, top deck), and focusing distance (left side, top deck). Each dial has an "A"utomatic setting; for instance, moving the focus dial to "A" puts the camera into autofocus mode. Similarly, the camera enters aperture-priority autoexposure mode when the aperture ring is set to "A", shutter-priority when the shutter speed is set to "A", and program autoexposure when both rings are set to "A". No program shift is provided. There is also a recessed button labeled "ABC" near the shutter release on the top deck, along with an LCD monitor providing status and current settings, including film speed and focal length. The "ABC" button is used to set automatic exposure bracketing and confirm adjustments to settings, saving them to memory.

On the top edge of the rear panel, from left to right, are the power button, viewfinder (with diopter adjustment), mode and drive buttons, and the zoom rocker. The mode button changes film advance settings, changing from self timer to remote control, continuous film advance, and multiple exposure. The drive button is used to change exposure compensation, manual film speed override, and recall exposure information for up to the last 108 exposures (3 rolls × 36 frames). The cameras are equipped with a quartz date back, which has a separate CR2025 battery.

An infrared remote shutter release is built into the lens cap. The flash uses two CR123A batteries and flash exposure is controlled automatically when the flash mode is set to AUTO regardless of the exposure mode set on the camera.
