= Konica Hexar =

1990s 35 mm autofocus camera

Konica Hexar (also known as the "Hexar AF")
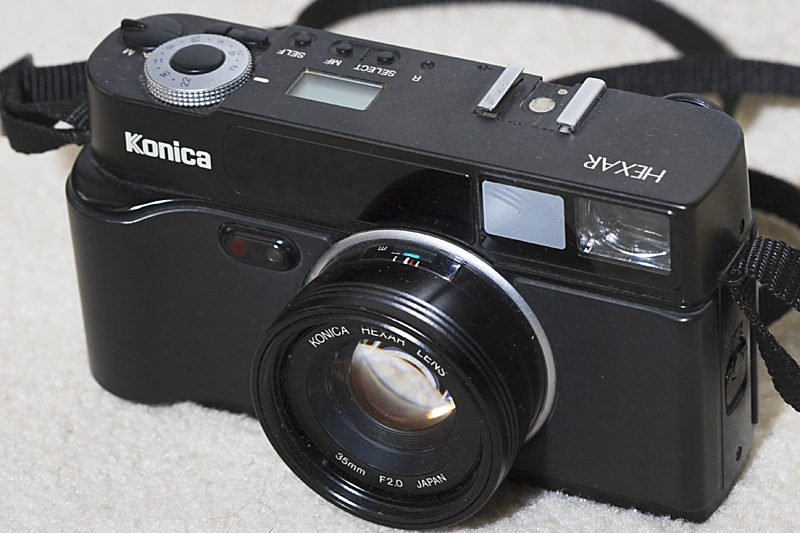

Overview
- Maker: Konica
- Type: 35 mm fixed lens, fixed focal length, autofocus

Lens
- Lens mount: fixed 35mm f2 lens

Focusing
- Focus: active-infrared autofocus with manual focus possible

Exposure/metering
- Exposure: Program or aperture priority AE, manual exposure possible

Flash
- Flash: hot shoe electronic flash

Shutter
- Frame rate: single-shot automatic film advance (~2 frame/s possible)

General
- Dimensions: 137.5×76.5×64.5 mm (5.41×3.01×2.54 in); 490g without batteries

The Konica Hexar is a 35 mm fixed-lens, fixed focal length autofocus camera which was produced through the 1990s. It was introduced to the market in 1993. While styled like a rangefinder camera, and intended for a similar style of photography, in specification it is more like a larger "point and shoot" camera.

The Konica Hexar enjoys something of a "cult status" among film camera aficionados because of the quality of its lens, rangefinder-style ergonomics and interesting and useful operating modes (notably its "silent mode").

== Lens ==
The camera is fitted with a 35mm fixed-focal length lens with autofocus and with a large maximum aperture of f2. The lens accepts lens filters of 46mm diameter (however, camera settings must be manually adjusted to compensate for any reduction in light transmission caused by the filter). A metal pull-out lens hood surrounds the lens.

The lens on the Hexar is considered to be of high quality for this type of camera and is often compared with other high-quality lenses such as those from Leica. It is often stated that the lens is a copy of the Leica Summicron 35mm f2 lens, although this does not appear to be the case. The source of this statement may be a pair of articles by Dante Stella where he states that photos taken with the Hexar have a similar "look" to those taken with a 35mm Summicron, but notes that the lens seems more similar to a Nikon 35mm f1.8 lens design.

== Viewfinder ==
The viewfinder uses projected parallax-corrected brightline framelines which shows the field of view to be captured when a photograph is taken. The centre of the viewfinder shows the point at which autofocus will be attempted, and a lamp in the viewfinder indicates when focus has been achieved. The viewfinder is located on the far upper left-hand side of the camera (when seen from the rear) in a position similar to that traditionally used for rangefinder cameras.

== Camera body ==
The Hexar is similar in form to a Leica M mount camera with equivalent lens and handgrip fitted. Construction is of cast-aluminium, finished in flat black or silver (later model), with a raised plastic hand-grip. Controls are an aperture control dial with central shutter release button, power/mode selection switch and a series of six multi-function buttons located on the top right-hand side of the camera (when seen from the rear), along with a multi-function LCD.

== Film transport ==
The camera has a hinged, swing-open, camera back with cut-out view window to show details of the film loaded in the camera. Film loading, advance and rewind is motorised and automatic. A button to manually trigger film rewind is also provided. Film sensitivity can be detected via standard DX encoding or the ISO value can be selected manually.

Film is automatically advanced to the next frame (and the shutter cocked) after each shutter activation. When the end of a film is reached (or the manual rewind button pressed), the film is wound back into the film canister, with a brief pause to allow the film to be removed "leader out" if desired.

== Silent Mode ==
One notable feature of the Konica Hexar is its "silent mode", which can be selected by a button on the camera top plate, when powering up. This enables a slower, but much quieter, film advance, shutter cocking and autofocus. In normal operation the Hexar is very quiet. It is nearly inaudible at any distance from the camera in "silent" mode (Leica rangefinder cameras, reputed to be very quiet, are not as quiet as the Hexar when in "silent mode".) In Hexar Silver models, "silent mode" was disabled at the factory, apparently due to a dispute over intellectual property. This model can have silent mode re-enabled through a somewhat arcane set of "programming" steps that can be readily discovered through internet searches. Note that this "firmware change" is not without risk and all steps must be completed exactly correctly.

== Shutter ==
The camera uses an electromagnetic stepper motor shutter. There is no provision for non-electronic shutter release; charged batteries are always required for shutter operation. Shutter speeds between 30 seconds and 1/250th of a second are provided.

== Focus ==
Focus can be set with an active-infrared autofocus or by manual adjustment. In autofocus mode, a central indicator in the viewfinder shows the point the camera will attempt to focus on and a lamp in the viewfinder indicates that focus has been achieved when the shutter release is half pressed. Focus remains locked until the shutter release is pressed fully or the button released. Manual focus is initiated by a button on the top plate of the camera. Focus is adjusted by reading the focus distance from the top-mounted LCD and adjusted with the "+" and "-" buttons. A single button can be pressed to lock focus at infinity.

== Exposure metering ==
The camera provides automatic exposure metering in aperture priority auto-exposure or programmed exposure modes (with AE lock and +/-2EV exposure compensation) or exposure can be manually set (with exposure metering still available). Light is metered through a sensor on the front of the camera body rather than using TTL metering or a sensor inside the filter ring. This means that manual camera settings (ISO value or exposure compensation) must be used to account for light reduction due to any filter fitted.

Exposure modes are selected via the four-position power/mode switch as follows:

- off the camera is switched off
- P Program AE (auto-exposure) mode. Exposure is set by calculating the correct shutter speed for the given lighting, film sensitivity and currently-selected aperture. If the calculated shutter speed is higher than the maximum available (1/250th of a second) the aperture is closed to expose with an achievable shutter speed value. If the calculated shutter speed is lower than the "camera shake" shutter speed (default 1/30 of a second, but variable from 1/4 to 1/60) the aperture is opened to expose with that shutter speed.
- A Aperture priority AE mode. Exposure is set by calculating the correct shutter speed or the given lighting, film sensitivity and currently-selected aperture. If that shutter speed is not available the photo is taken with the closest available shutter speed, but the aperture value is not varied.
- M Manual exposure mode. Exposure is set by the user indicating the aperture value via the aperture dial and the shutter speed via push-buttons on the camera top plate. Half-pressing the shutter release will set the shutter speed value to the correct value as calculated by the camera's metering system, which the user can then vary.

A self-timer button, also on the camera's top plate, can be used to trigger an exposure with a time delay of approximately 10 seconds (cancelable).

== Electronic flash ==
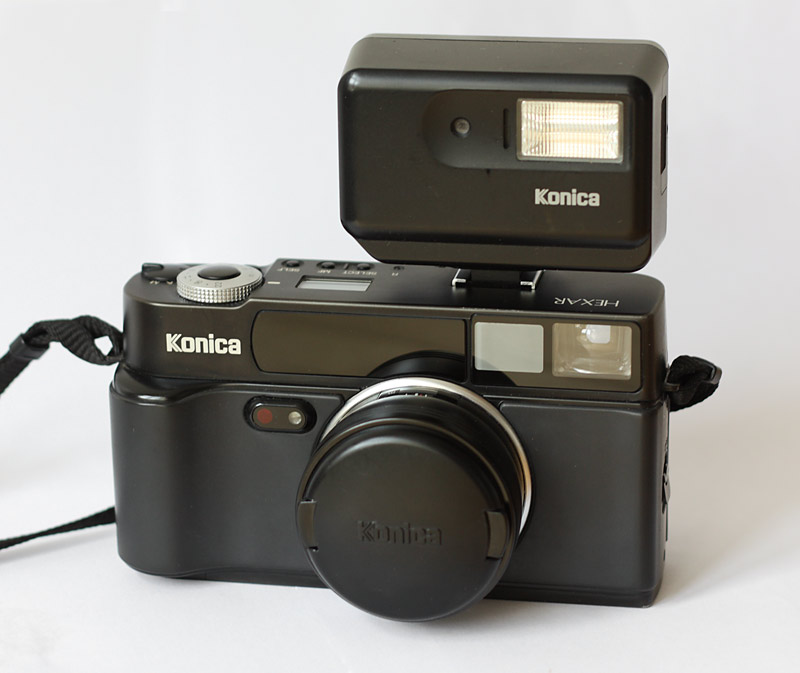
Hexar with the original flash and lenscap attached

The camera has a flash hot-shoe, and was often sold with a dedicated Konica Hx-14 flash unit. Automatic flash exposure is available when used with this HX-14 unit, in variable-aperture automatic mode when set to [P]rogram mode (useful for fill-flash), fixed-aperture automatic flash mode when set to [A] or [M] modes or manual mode when the flash is set to "P-full". Manual flash is possible with other flash units, including non-Konica units.

== Additional features ==
Later-production examples of the Hexar supported four features not available in earlier units:

- multiple exposures
- AF focusing for infrared Kodak and Konica films
- Guide number flash exposure using detected autofocus range
- a manual exposure mode with spot metering

For a time, Konica offered an upgrade to retrofit these features to earlier-model cameras. Cameras without this modification can have this upgrade applied through a set of "programming" steps which can be discovered through internet searches (a similar in concept to the steps to enable "silent mode"). As with "silent mode" enablement, this "firmware change" is not without risk and all steps must be completed exactly correctly.

== Models and packaging ==
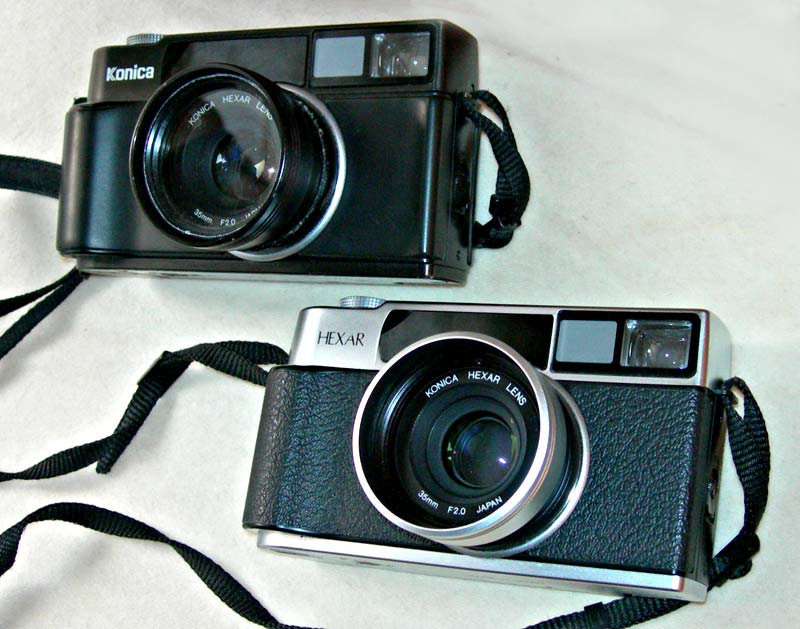
The original Hexar and the Hexar Silver

The Konica Hexar was sold either "body only" or as a set with HX-14 flash unit. Earlier models were black and came in a "standard" model or a model supporting an autodate film back. Later-production samples of this unit supported additional features, as noted above. A Hexar Rhodium finish (metallic pinkish in color) was available as an alternative to the more standard black finish. A similar model was also marketed as Hexar Titanium in other markets.

In 1993 two limited-edition versions of the Hexar were released:

- Hexar Classic: "Classic: 1993 silver chrome finish Hexars commemorating the 120th Anniversary of Konica. Hard to find since only 2000 were made, special gray presentation box, top plate engraved "120 Years, Since 1873."" This model supported auto-bracketing of exposure, a feature not found in other models (except, perhaps, the Gold Hexar below).
- Hexar Gold: "Konica's Gold Hexar is very stylishly done with a burnished gold finish, rather than the shiny gold finish used by most gold cameras. The packaging is first rate as well, with a special red velvet lined presentation walnut embossed case. The inside case is labeled "Konica's 120th Anniversary."" 500 Gold Hexars were produced.

In 1997 the Hexar Silver replaced earlier models, finished in a silver color and with "silent mode" disabled at the factory, apparently due to a dispute over intellectual property. These models can have silent mode re-enabled through a somewhat arcane set of "programming" steps that can be readily discovered through internet searches.

== Successors ==
Konica later released a rangefinder camera, the Hexar RF, with some (perhaps superficial) similarities to the Hexar camera. They also released a Leica thread mount lens in 35mm focal length (the UC Hexanon 35mm f2 in so-called L mount) that is said to be a design descendant of Hexar camera's 35mm f2 lens.

== End of the company ==
Konica and Minolta merged to form Konica Minolta in 2003. In 2006 Sony acquired photographic assets from Konica Minolta, with the latter company withdrawing from all photography-related activity. The targets of the acquisition by Sony were the designs and tooling for Minolta/Konica Minolta SLR cameras and accessories. It is not known whether Sony acquired other photographic assets such as film camera designs or whether those are retained by Konica Minolta. Whatever the case, none of the involved companies has expressed any interest in renewed production of film cameras or digital cameras based on such designs.

Konica Minolta has since announced "Konica Minolta ceased the entire customer services for Konica Minolta cameras and related products, as of 31 December 2010." It appears that services such as downloads for camera manuals were withdrawn at roughly the time of this announcement.

== See also ==
- Contax T – premium compact AF 35 mm film cameras
- Leica minilux – premium compact AF 35 mm film cameras
- Minolta TC-1 – premium compact AF 35 mm film camera
- Nikon 35Ti/28Ti – premium compact AF 35 mm film cameras
- Olympus XA – another small rangefinder 35 mm film camera
- Ricoh GR series – premium compact AF 35 mm film cameras
- Rollei QZ 35W/35T – premium compact AF 35 mm film cameras
