= Point-and-shoot camera =

Type of simple still camera

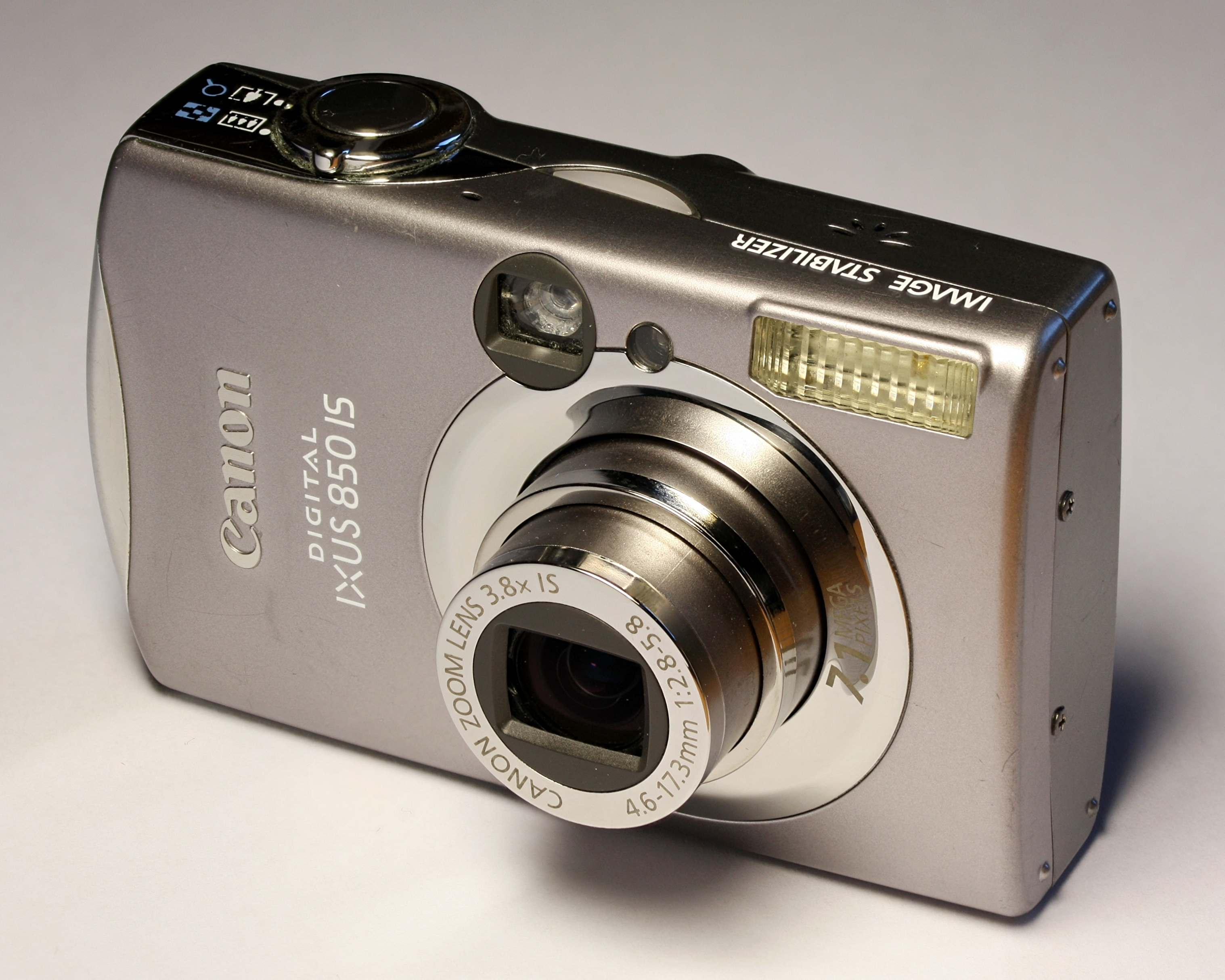
A point-and-shoot digital camera with optical viewfinder made by Canon, specifically the IXUS 850 IS, 2006

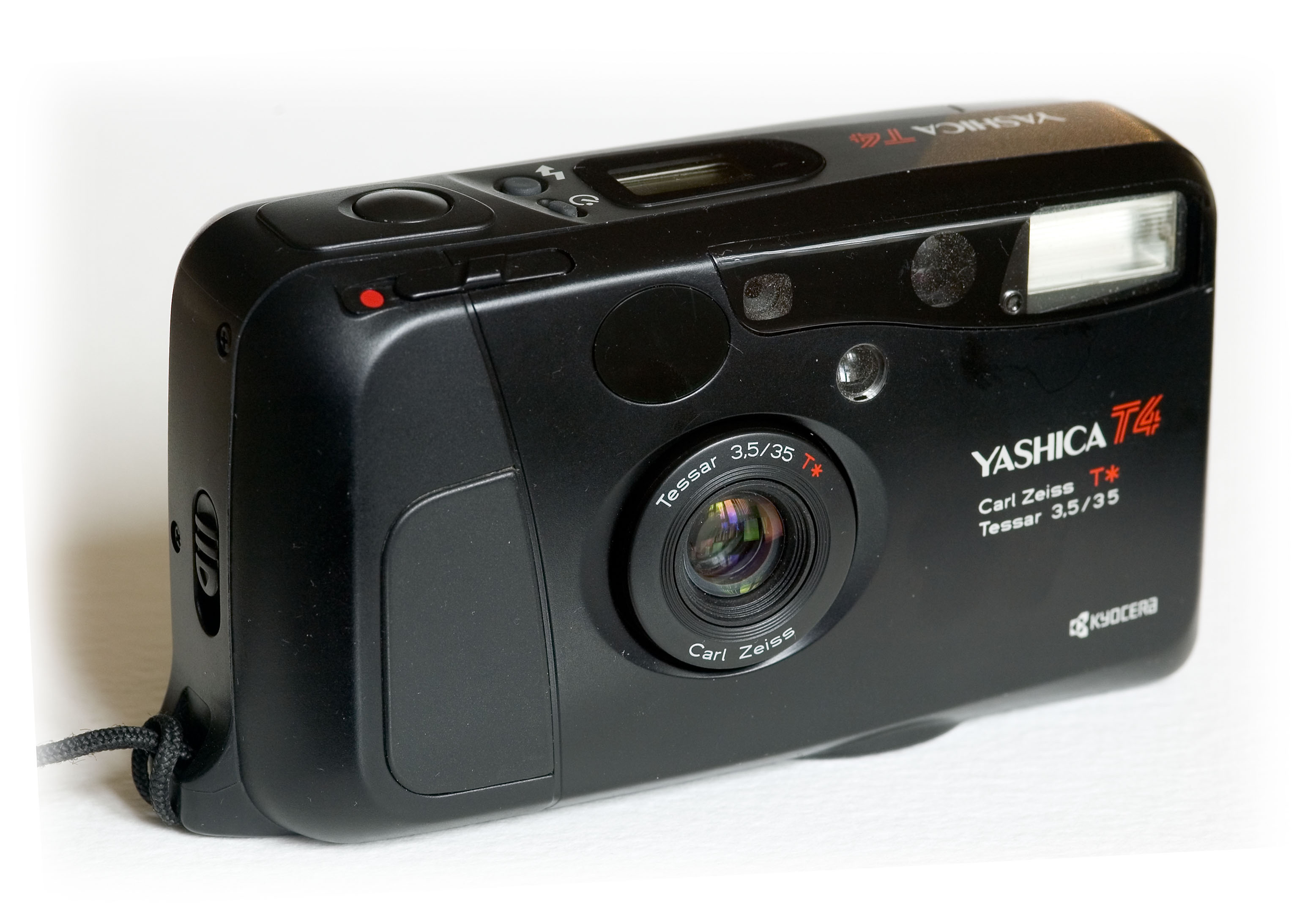
A point-and-shoot film camera made by Yashica with a Tessar lens, early 1990s

A point-and-shoot camera, also known as a compact camera and sometimes abbreviated to P&S, is a still camera (either film or digital) designed primarily for simple operation. Most use focus free lenses or autofocus for focusing, automatic systems for setting the exposure options, and have flash units built in. They are popular for vernacular photography by people who do not consider themselves photographers but want easy-to-use cameras for snapshots of vacations, parties, reunions and other events.

Most compact digital cameras use small 1/2.3-type (“1/2.3-inch”) image sensors, but since 2008, a few non-interchangeable lens compact cameras use a larger sensor such as 1.0-type (“1-inch”), APS-C (e.g. Fujifilm X100 series), or even full frame (e.g. Sony RX1 series). Most models prioritize being operated in auto mode, but some high end point-and-shoot cameras have PASM (program, aperture priority, shutter priority, and manual modes) on the mode dial, raw image format, and a hot shoe. None have interchangeable lenses, but some have secondary lens mounts.

Point-and-shoots have been by far the best selling type of standalone camera, as distinct from camera phones. However, point-and-shoot camera sales declined after about 2010 as smartphones overtook them in usage. To overcome market shrinkage, compact camera manufacturers began making higher-end versions with a stylish metal body.

== Types of point-and-shoot digital cameras ==
Current point-and-shoot digital cameras have coalesced into three categories:

- premium compact cameras with a large sensor and prime lens optimized for travel and street photography;
- vlogging cameras with a flip screen and wide-angle or ultra wide-angle lens;
- travel zoom cameras with a compact body.

Fixed-lens cameras that include an all-in-one superzoom lens in a large DSLR-style body are known as bridge cameras.

== Types of point-and-shoot film cameras ==
The lowest-end point-and-shoot film cameras are similar to disposable cameras, but can be reloaded. These cameras have focus-free lenses, with fixed apertures. They may or may not have a light meter. Most have a wheel or lever for advancing the film and cocking the shutter, and a crank for returning the film to the canister for unloading. Because of the fixed apertures, models with flash have no way of controlling the exposure from the flash. Therefore, flash pictures have to be taken within a narrow range of distance from the subject.

Advanced models use automatic focus and have variable apertures. They all have light meters. They use electric motors to advance and rewind the film. They are much more versatile than the low-end models. They are also likely to have zoom lenses, more advanced auto-focus systems, exposure systems with manual controls, larger apertures and sharper lenses. They may have special lamps or pre-flash systems designed to reduce red eye in flash pictures of people.

== Comparison to SLRs and DSLRs ==
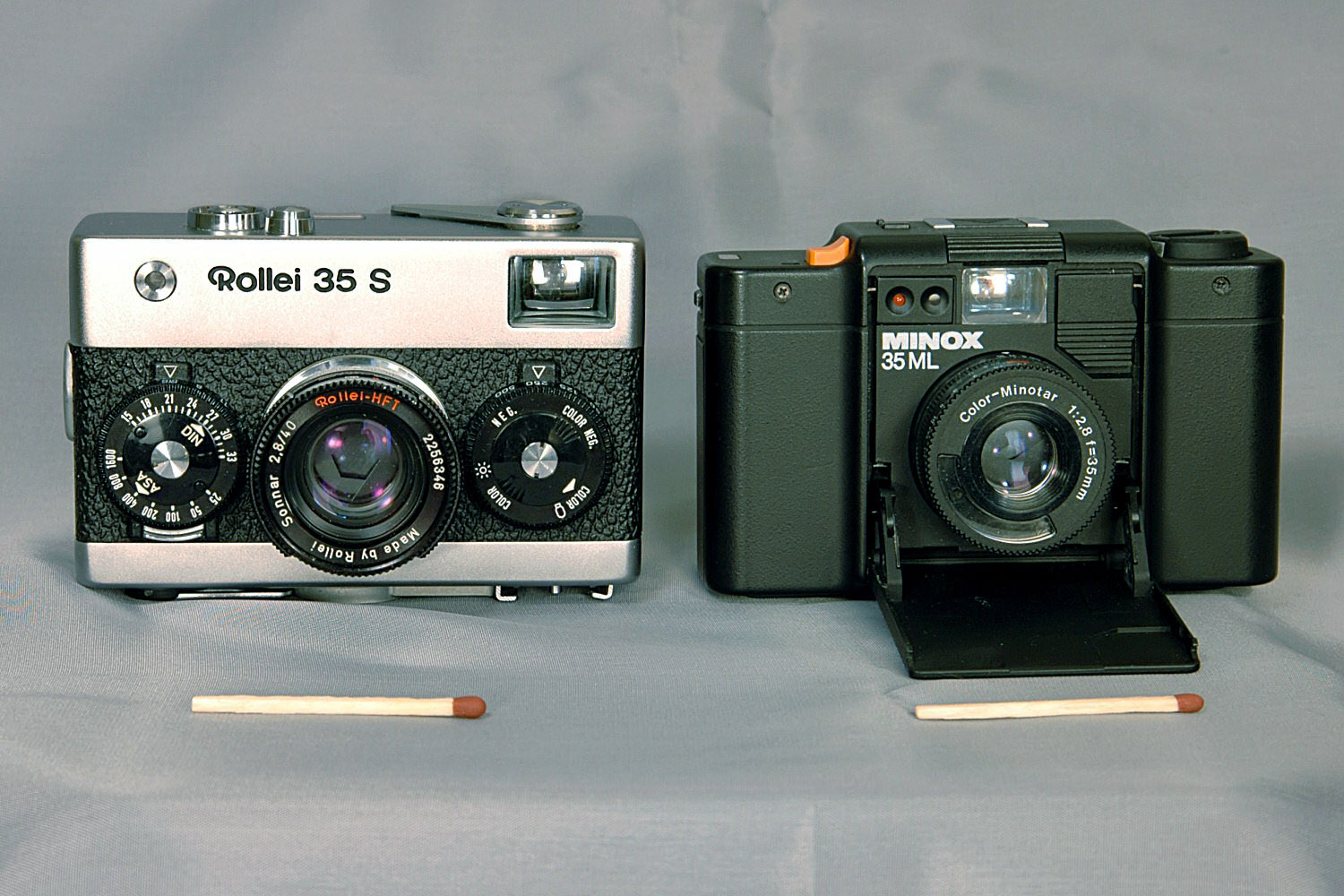
Two film point-and-shoot cameras, Rollei 35 from 1966 and Minox 35ML from 1985

Point-and-shoot cameras are distinguished from single-lens reflex cameras (SLRs) in several respects: point-and-shoot film cameras, and many digital ones, use a viewfinder. The image that the photographer sees is not the same image that passes through the primary lens of the camera. Rather, the image in the viewfinder passes through a separate lens. SLRs, on the other hand, have only one lens, and a mirror diverts the image from the lens into the viewfinder; that mirror then retracts when the picture is taken so that the image can be recorded on the film or sensor. With this mechanism, pictures cannot be previewed on the LCD screens of most digital SLRs (DSLRs). Some manufacturers have found a way around this limitation, often by splitting the image into two just before reaching the viewfinder eyepiece. One image goes into the viewfinder and the other goes into a low resolution image sensor to allow light metering or previewing on the LCD, or both.

Digital cameras share one advantage of the SLR design, as the camera's display image comes through the lens, not a separate viewfinder. Mirrorless interchangeable lens cameras (MILCs) lack a mirror but in many ways can be used the same as DSLRs. Many smaller digital point-and-shoots of the 2010s omit the viewfinder and use only the screen.

With SLR cameras, it is important that the image in the viewfinder be the same image recorded by the film or sensor, so that the effect of the add-on lenses and filters can be seen by the photographer. Point-and-shoot cameras generally don't have such add-on devices, hence no need. Small cameras, including digital ones, encourage the occurrence of photographic orbs – unexpected, typically circular artifacts that occur in flash photography – where the short distance between the lens and the built-in flash decreases the angle of light reflection to the lens. The resulting retroreflection makes dust particles bright and visible.

== Sales decline and current trends ==
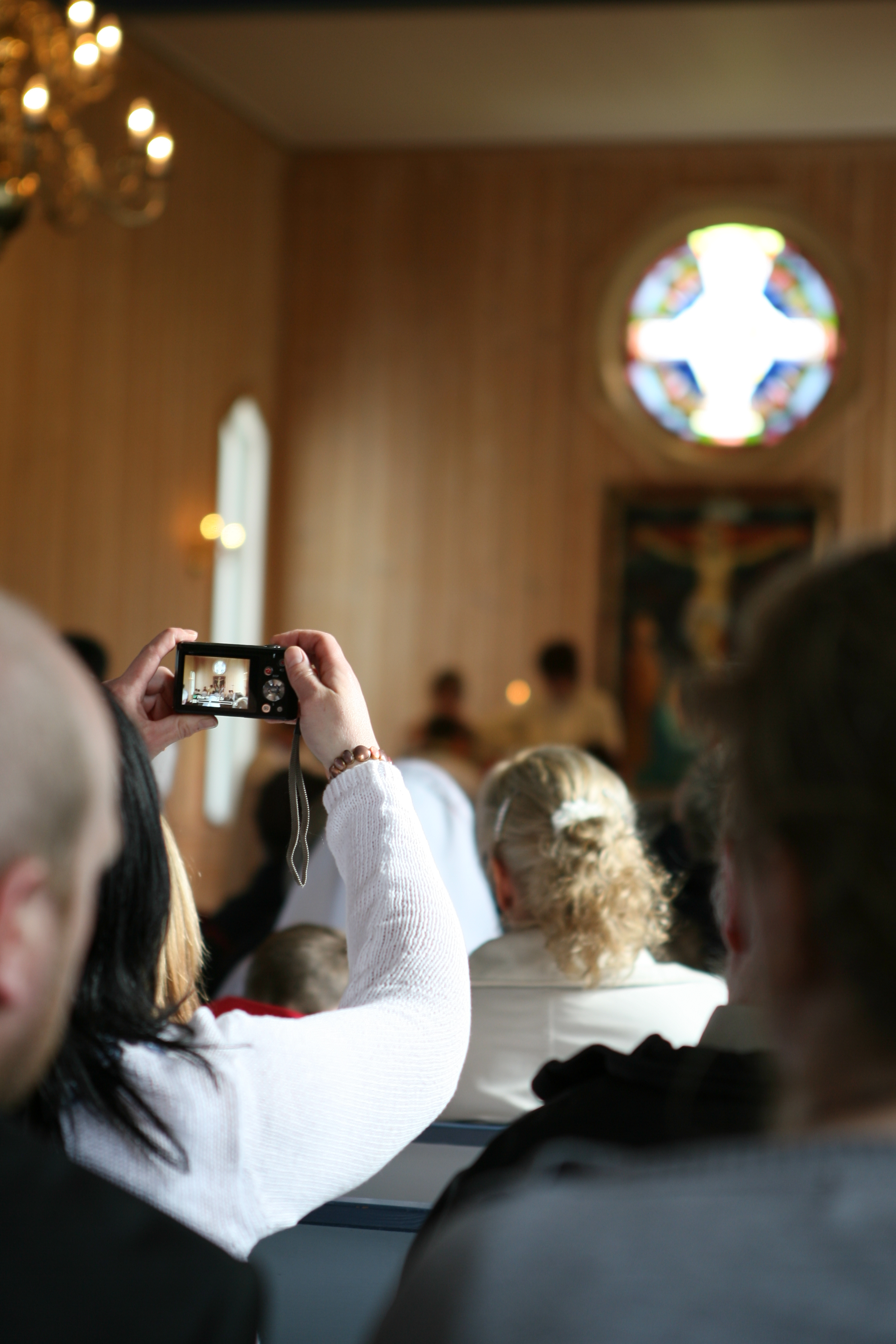
Point-and-shoot digital camera using live preview for a picture in a church in Norway

According to the NPD Group, up to end of November 2011 point-and-shoot cameras took 44 percent of photos, down from 52 percent in 2010, while camera-equipped smartphones took 27 percent of photos in 2011, up from 17 percent. Unit total sales of all types of point-and-shoot cameras declined by 17 percent year on year, but increased by 16 percent for cameras having optical zoom greater than 10x. At the end of 2012, more than one brand offered point-and-shoot cameras with 24x optical superzoom as compensation of sales decline and in later years longer zooms became commonplace. Concurrently with rising sales of smartphones, the sales of more advanced cameras like SLRs have also increased, at the expense of point-and-shoot.

Point-and-shoot camera sales dropped by about 40 percent in 2013, particularly for inexpensive cameras. Fujifilm and Olympus stopped development of low-end point-and-shoot cameras and focused on mid and high-end cameras at higher prices.

Shipment dropped to 12 million units in 2016, only one-tenth of the peak reached in 2008.

After years of decline, there was renewed nostalgia-driven interest in compact point-and-shoot digital cameras as of 2023, particularly older models in the second hand market. While major makers like Canon had already abandoned the budget compact sector by this time in favor of premium cameras like mirrorless, others like Kodak (Pixpro) and AgfaPhoto managed to expand in the fast-growing budget end during this time. Sales of fixed-lens cameras made a significant increase in 2025. In Japan retail data showed that the number one best-selling camera in the country in 2025 was the Kodak Pixpro FZ55, a basic low-priced product that beat all the more advanced and mirrorless cameras on the market.

== Types of film ==
Most film-based point-and-shoots made after the late 1980s use 35mm film. The key innovations that made 35mm point-and-shoot cameras possible were automatic film loading and automatic advance and rewind. Advanced Photo System film was mildly popular in the 1990s. 126 film was also popular during the 1970s.

== Terminology ==
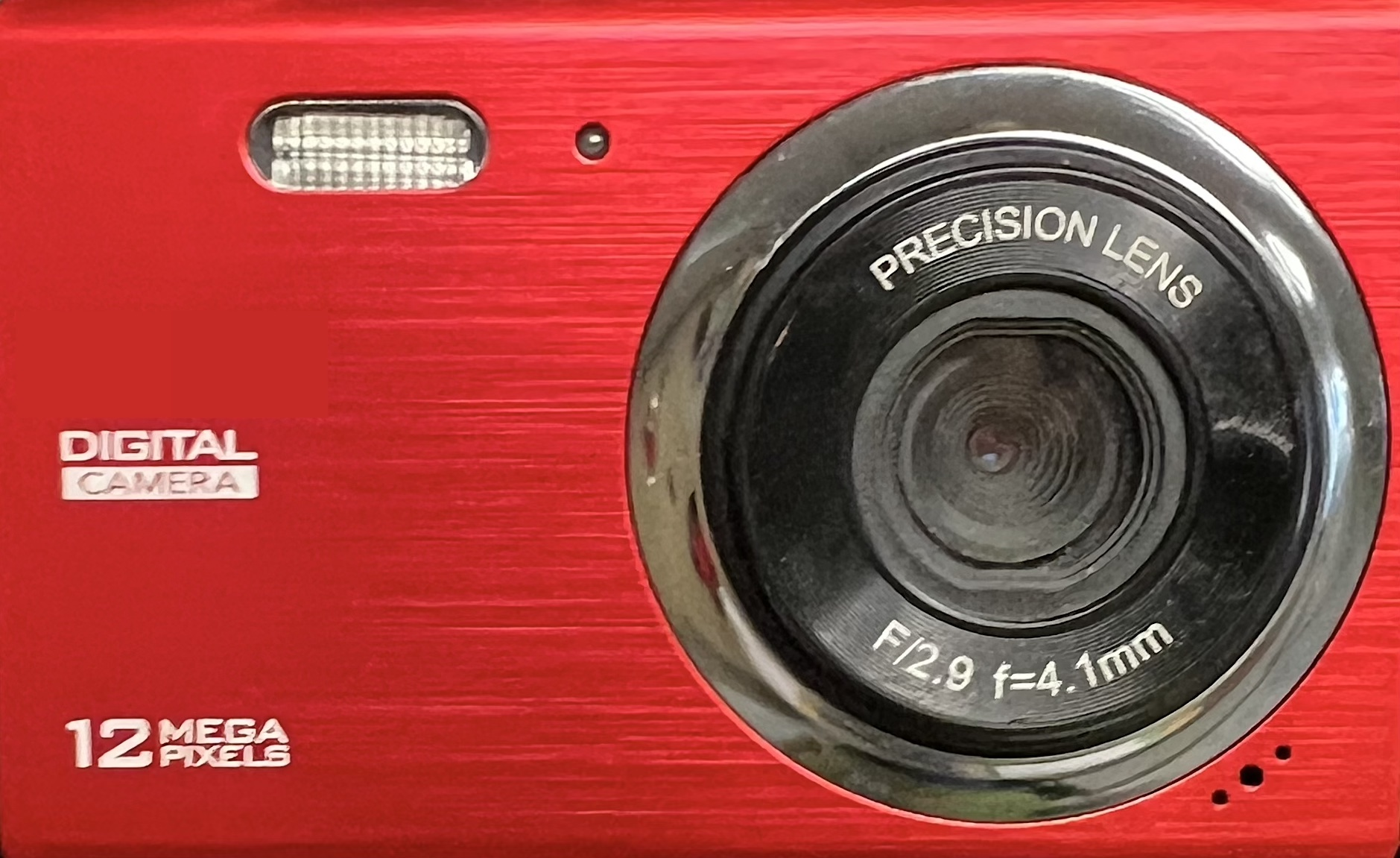
A red, 12-megapixel digital camera.

The terms "point and shoot" and "compact camera" are used differently in different parts of the world. In the UK point-and-shoot predominantly means a fully automatic camera, regardless of size or shape. A "compact camera" on the other hand, has a small body, regardless of any fully automatic capabilities. Thus a DSLR can have point-and-shoot modes, and some compact cameras are not designed for point and shoot operation, with the equivalent controls to a DSLR.

The use of "point-and-shoot" to mean a small or compact camera regardless of automation capabilities has long been predominant in the US, and in the 21st century it began spreading elsewhere.

The term "compact system camera" has also been used to refer to mirrorless cameras.

== See also ==
- List of large sensor fixed-lens cameras
- List of superzoom compact cameras
- List of bridge cameras
- Digital photography
- Electronic viewfinder
