= SGR =

SGR may refer to or abbreviate:

== Arts and culture ==
=== Music ===
- SGR (band), a ska band from New Jersey, United States

=== Video games ===
- Stargate: Resistance, an online, third-person shooter based on the television series Stargate SG-1

=== Webcomics ===
- Scary Go Round

== Organisations ==
- Scientists for Global Responsibility, a United Kingdom group that promotes the ethical practice and use of science and technology
- Service Général du Renseignement et de la Sécurité, the French name of the Belgian General Information and Security Service
- The Shaw Group, a company which formerly used SGR as its ticker symbol

== People ==
- Stephanie Garcia Richard

== Science and technology ==
- Samsung SGR-A1, a South Korean military robot sentry
- Select Graphic Rendition (ANSI), an ANSI X3.64 escape sequence

=== Astronomy ===
- Sagittarius (constellation)
- Soft gamma repeater, in astronomy

=== Biology and medicine ===
- Specific growth rate
- Substantia gelatinosa of Rolando, a V-shaped or crescentic mass of translucent, gelatinous neuroglia in the spinal cord

=== Broadcasting ===
- Heart Colchester and Heart Ipswich, radio stations in Suffolk, England both once known as SGR

=== Geology ===
- Shale Gouge Ratio, a mathematical algorithm aiming to predict the fault rock types for simple fault zones

=== Planning and economics ===
- smart green resilient, planning concept
- Sustainable growth rate, finance concept
  - Medicare Sustainable Growth Rate, concept used by Medicare (United States)

=== Transport ===
- Segar LRT station in Bukit Panjang, Singapore (LRT station abbreviation)
- Slade Green railway station in London, England (National Rail station code)
- South Gippsland Railway, a former heritage railway in Victoria, Australia
- Standard gauge railway, commonly abbreviated SGR in East Africa
  - Kenya Standard Gauge Railway (Madaraka Express)
  - Mombasa–Nairobi Standard Gauge Railway in Kenya
  - Uganda Standard Gauge Railway
  - Tanzania Standard Gauge Railway
- Sugar Land Regional Airport (SGR) in Texas, United States

== See also ==
- GRS (disambiguation)
- GSR (disambiguation)
- RGS (disambiguation)
- RSG (disambiguation)
- SRG (disambiguation)
