= Ricoh GR =

Ricoh GR may refer to:

- Ricoh GR film cameras, series of film cameras released in 1996
- Ricoh GR digital cameras, series of digital cameras released in 2005
  - Ricoh GR Digital, digital camera model released in 2005
  - Ricoh GR Digital II, digital camera model released in 2005
  - Ricoh GR (large sensor compact camera), digital camera model released in 2013
