= GR =

GR may refer to:

== Arts and entertainment ==
=== Cinematography ===
- Ricoh GR digital cameras, a series of digital cameras manufactured by Ricoh
  - Ricoh GR (large sensor compact camera), the current line of cameras in the GR series
- Golmaal Returns, a Hindi comedy film
- Generator Rex, an animated sci-fi series
- Guilty Remnant, a fictional cult in The Leftovers (TV series)

=== Music ===
- GR series guitar synthesizers produced since 1977 by the Roland Corporation of Japan
- Ghost Reveries, a 2005 album by Opeth
- Good Riddance (band), an American punk group

=== Literature ===
- Greetings & Readings, an independent bookseller
- GoodReads, run by Amazon

=== Video games ===
- GameRevolution, run by Mandatory
- GamesRadar+, run by Future plc
- Tom Clancy's Ghost Recon, a tactical shooter series
- Gravity Rush, an action role-playing video game

== Government and politics ==
- Georgius Rex (royal cypher: GR); see King George (disambiguation)
  - George VI of the United Kingdom
  - George V of the United Kingdom
- Globalise Resistance, a British anti-capitalist group
- Gonnema Regiment of the South African Army
- Government relations, or lobbying
- Government Resident, a diplomatic post
- G.R., short for General Register, the prefix for a case docket number in the Supreme Court of the Philippines

== Places ==
- Greece (ISO 3166/NATO:GR)
- Grand Rapids, Michigan, United States
- Grand Rapids, Minnesota, United States
- Giurgiu County, Romania
- Grisons, a Swiss canton (ISO:CH-GR)
- Groningen (province), Netherlands (ISO:NL-GR)
- Province of Grosseto, Tuscany, Italy
- Garden Reach, Kolkata, West Bengal, India

== Science and technology ==
=== Biochemistry ===
- Glucocorticoid receptor, a structure
- Glutathione reductase, an enzyme

=== Computing and Internet ===
- .gr, Greece's top-level domain
- Google Reader, a defunct RSS reader service
- The low-resolution mode of Apple II graphics

=== Meteorology and physics ===
- GR, METAR reporting code for hail ≥ 5 mm in diameter
- Gutenberg–Richter law, in seismology
- Grashof number, in fluid dynamics
- General relativity, Einstein's 1915 theory of gravity

== Mathematics ==
=== Abstract algebra ===
- Galois ring
- Grassmannian, $\operatorname{Gr}_k(V)$
- Associated graded ring, $\operatorname{gr}_I(R)$

=== Other uses in math ===
- Gradian, in geometry
- Gradshteyn and Ryzhik, a calculus reference work

== Transport ==
=== Transport businesses ===
- London North Eastern Railway, Britain (reporting mark: GR)
- Aurigny Air Services, Guernsey (IATA designator: GR)
- Gemini Air Cargo, Virginia, US (defunct IATA designator: GR)
- Goodrich Corporation, an American tire and aerospace manufacturer
- Toyota Gazoo Racing, a motorsports division

=== Other transport uses ===
- GR footpath, a class of long-distance trail in western Europe
- Toyota GR engine, a petrol automotive engine series
- Green Line (Washington Metro), United States Capital Region
- Berliet GR, a range of heavy-duty trucks

== Other uses ==
- Gabriel Richard High School, a private high school in Michigan
- Golden Retriever, a dog breed
- Grain (unit) (gr), an amount of mass
- Gwoyeu Romatzyh, a system of romanization for Chinese

== See also ==
- GRS (disambiguation)
- Ghost Rider (disambiguation)
- JR (disambiguation)
- RG (disambiguation)
- G (disambiguation)
- R (disambiguation)
- GR1 (disambiguation)
