= GR1 =

GR1 may refer to:

- GR 1, footpath in France
- GR-1 "Anvil", weapon
- Chapel Hill Conference (1957), also known to be first in the GR series
- Ford Shelby GR-1, motorcar
- A robot in Giant Robo
- Ghost Rider (2007 film), first film in the series
- Global Rocket 1 (GR-1), intercontinental ballistic missile
- Gravity Rush, abbreviation to the game
- Gregor GR-1, airplane
- A Panavia Tornado aircraft
- A Rai Isoradio news bulletin
- A Ricoh GR film camera
- Roland GR-1, guitar synthetizer
- A SEPECAT Jaguar aircraft
- Tom Clancy's Ghost Recon (2001 video game), abbreviation to the game

== See also ==
- GR (disambiguation)
- GR2
