= Leica Q3 43 =

Overview
- Maker: Leica Camera
- Type: Large sensor fixed-lens camera
- Released: 26 September 2024
- Intro price: $6,985 / €6,750

Lens
- Lens: 43 mm APO aspherical lens
- F-numbers: f/2 to f/16

Sensor/medium
- Sensor type: CMOS
- Sensor size: 36mm × 24mm (full frame)
- Maximum resolution: 60 MP
- Recording medium: SD, SDHC or SDXC memory card

Focusing
- Focus: AF-S, AF-C, manual

Flash
- Flash synchronization: up to 1/2000s

Shutter
- Shutter: Mechanical and electronic
- Shutter speeds: 120s to 1/2000s (mechanical), 1s to 1/16000s (electronic)

Viewfinder
- Viewfinder: 0.5-inch OLED with 5.76 million dots
- Frame coverage: 100%

Image processing
- Image processor: Maestro IV

General
- Video recording: 8K at 24 and 30 fps; 4K at 24, 30, and 60 fps; 1080p at 60 and 120 fps
- LCD screen: 3 inches with 1,840,000 dots, touchscreen
- Body features: IP52-rated magnesium alloy body
- Weight: 772 g (27 oz) (688g without battery)
- Made in: Germany

Chronology
- Predecessor: Leica Q3

The Leica Q3 43 is a full-frame fixed-lens camera introduced in 2024 as a companion to the Leica Q3. It is Leica's first Q-series camera to feature an apochromatic lens.

== Specifications ==
The Q3 43 has a stabilized 43 mm f/2 Summicron APO lens with digital crop modes corresponding to 35 mm equivalent focal lengths of 60, 75, 90, and 120 mm. The Q3 43 features the same 60-megapixel CMOS full-frame sensor, measuring 36 × 24 mm, found in the original Q3. The Q3 43 is capable of 8K video recording at up to 30 frames per second and features phase-detection autofocus. The Q3 43's high resolution OLED electronic viewfinder has a resolution of 5.76 million dots.

=== Lens ===
For the first time in a Q-series camera, the Q3 43 has an apochromatically corrected lens, which Leica refers to by the designation APO. APO lenses have additional elements which aid in focusing light of different wavelengths, reducing chromatic and spherical aberration which results from different wavelengths of light hitting the sensor at different locations. In interviews, Leica's chief lens designer Peter Karbe has stated that the APO configuration along with other lens improvements allows the nominally f/2 APO lens on the Q3 43 to have comparable depth of focus to an f/1.4 lens without APO.

Leica states that the 43mm focal length was chosen because it corresponds most closely to the normal focal length of the human eye. 43mm is also the diagonal measurement of the 24x36mm full-frame sensor.

=== Body ===
Like its predecessor the Q3, the Q3 43 includes a tilting screen with vertical tilt functionality as well as HDMI and USB-C connectivity. The Q3 43 is IP52 rated against dust or water ingress. To distinguish it from the Q3, the Q3 43's body is covered in a dark grey leather rather than black. The Q3 43 also inherits the Q3's upgraded phase and contrast detection autofocus system with eye and animal recognition.

=== Software ===
The Q3 43 also offers "Leica Looks" that can be downloaded to the camera. These allow for non-destructive modification of the camera's JPG output file to make the image appear more like traditional film photography, in a manner similar to the Fujifilm X series. Both the digital crop and Leica Looks features do not alter the digital negative RAW file, and thus the original image can still be accessed and handled in photo processing software.

In December 2025 Leica released the Firmware 4.0.0 for the Leica Q3 43. This firmware changed the user interface completely, inspired by the user interface for the Leica SL3. It also featured a much improved auto-focus system.

== Comparison to other fixed-lens cameras ==
The Q3 43, like its 28mm counterpart the Q3, is one of the most expensive cameras of its niche and offers the highest resolution of all mass-produced fixed-lens cameras. Compared to the Q3, it offers a narrower 43mm focal length with an APO lens and costs $600/€800 more than the Q3. The Q3 and Q3 43 are the only cameras in their class to offer dust and water resistance.

Its primary competitors are the full-frame Sony RX1R III, the similarly styled but smaller-sensor Fujifilm X100VI, the medium format Fujifilm GFX100RF and the extremely compact Ricoh GR IIIx that shares a similar 40mm field of view.

== See also ==
- List of large sensor fixed-lens cameras
- List of retro-style digital cameras
