= Leica Q3 =

2023 full-frame premium compact camera

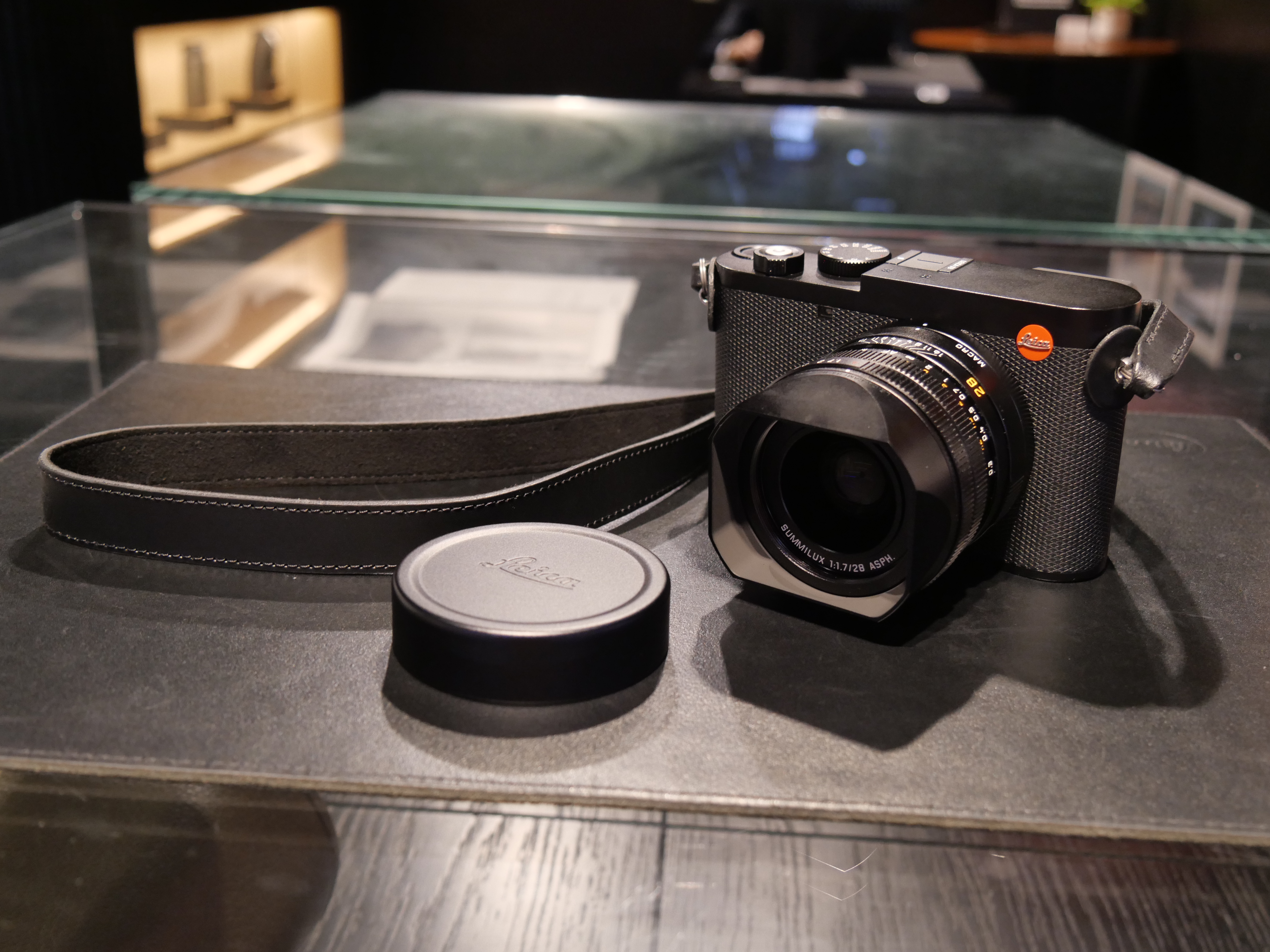

Overview
- Maker: Leica Camera
- Type: Large sensor fixed-lens camera
- Released: 25 May 2023

Lens
- Lens: 28 mm
- F-numbers: f/1.7 at the widest

Sensor/medium
- Sensor size: 36mm × 24mm (full frame)
- Maximum resolution: 60 MP
- Recording medium: SD, SDHC or SDXC memory card

Viewfinder
- Viewfinder: 0.5-inch OLED with 5.76 million dots
- Frame coverage: 100%

Image processing
- Image processor: Maestro IV

General
- Video recording: 8K at 24 and 30 fps; 4K at 24, 30, and 60 fps; 1080p at 60 and 120 fps
- LCD screen: 3 inches with 1,840,000 dots, touchscreen
- Made in: Germany

Chronology
- Predecessor: Leica Q2
- Successor: Leica Q3 43

The Leica Q3 is a full-frame fixed-lens camera introduced in 2023 as the successor to the Leica Q2.

== Specifications ==
The Q3 has a stabilized 28 mm f/1.7 Summilux lens with digital crop modes corresponding to 35 mm equivalent focal lengths of 35, 50, 75, and 90 mm. The Q3 features a 60-megapixel CMOS full-frame sensor, measuring 36 × 24 mm — the same resolution and perhaps the same sensor found in the Leica M11 and the Sony α7R V. The Q3 is capable of 8K video recording at up to 30 frames per second and features phase-detection autofocus. The Q3's high resolution OLED electronic viewfinder has a resolution of 5.76 million dots.

For the first time in the Leica Q series, the Q3 includes a tilting screen. The mechanism protrudes from the back, facilitating photographing from different angles not at eye level.

The Q3 also offers "Leica Looks" that can be downloaded to the camera. These are similar to Fujifilm's film simulations or Adobe's Lightroom presets.

== Comparison to other fixed-lens cameras ==
The Q3 is one of the most expensive cameras of its niche and offers the highest resolution of all mass-produced fixed-lens cameras. Its primary competitors are the Sony RX1R II, the similarly styled Fujifilm X100VI, and the Ricoh GR III that shares the 28mm field of view.

== Variations ==
The Leica Q3 43 was introduced in September 2024 and modifies the original Q3 by replacing the 28mm Summilux ASPH lens with a 43mm APO Summicron ASPH lens. In Leica's press release announcing the Q3 43, they stated that the 43mm focal length was chosen because "[it] closely mirrors the natural perception of the human eye, enabling the creation of realistic, distortion-free images".

== See also ==
- List of large sensor fixed-lens cameras
- List of retro-style digital cameras
