= GRS =

GRS may refer to:

== Politics ==
=== Malaysia ===
- Gabungan Rakyat Sabah (GRS), a Malaysian coalition of Sabah-based parties. It was established in 2020 and then registered in 2022 by former United Alliance of Sabah and United Borneo Alliance component parties operating solely in Sabah inspired by the formula of Sarawak-based coalition, Gabungan Parti Sarawak.
- Gagasan Rakyat Sabah (also known as PGRS), a political party based in Sabah, Malaysia and also a main component party of Gabungan Rakyat Sabah (GRS) coalition.

== Education ==
- Geneva Reformed Seminary, in Greenville, South Carolina
- Gifted Rating Scales, an educational assessment test
- Great River Charter Montessori School, in St. Paul, Minnesota

== Science ==
- Gamma-ray spectrometer
- Gamma Ray Spectrometer (2001 Mars Odyssey), an instrument on 2001 Mars Odyssey
- Genetic risk score
- Great Red Spot, a feature on Jupiter

== Military ==
- Global Response Staff, a security role in CIA's Directorate of Support branch
- Graves Registration Service, now Mortuary Affairs, a service of the United States Army

== Other uses ==
- General Railway Signal, a former American railway signaling company
- Gender-affirming surgery, also known as gender reassignment surgery
- The Gerry Ryan Show, an Irish radio show
- Global Resource Serialization, part of the IBM z/OS operating system
- Government Rubber-Styrene (GR-S) produced by the United States Synthetic Rubber Program during World War II
- Grand Rapids Symphony, in Michigan
- Grassroot Soccer, an international health organization
- Gresi language
- Grosseto Air Base, in Italy
- Guilford Rail System, now known as Pan Am Railways, an American railway holding company
- GRS Riflestocks, a Norwegian firearm stock manufacturer
- Gauche républicaine et socialiste, French political party
