= Leica Q2 =

2019 full-frame premium compact camera

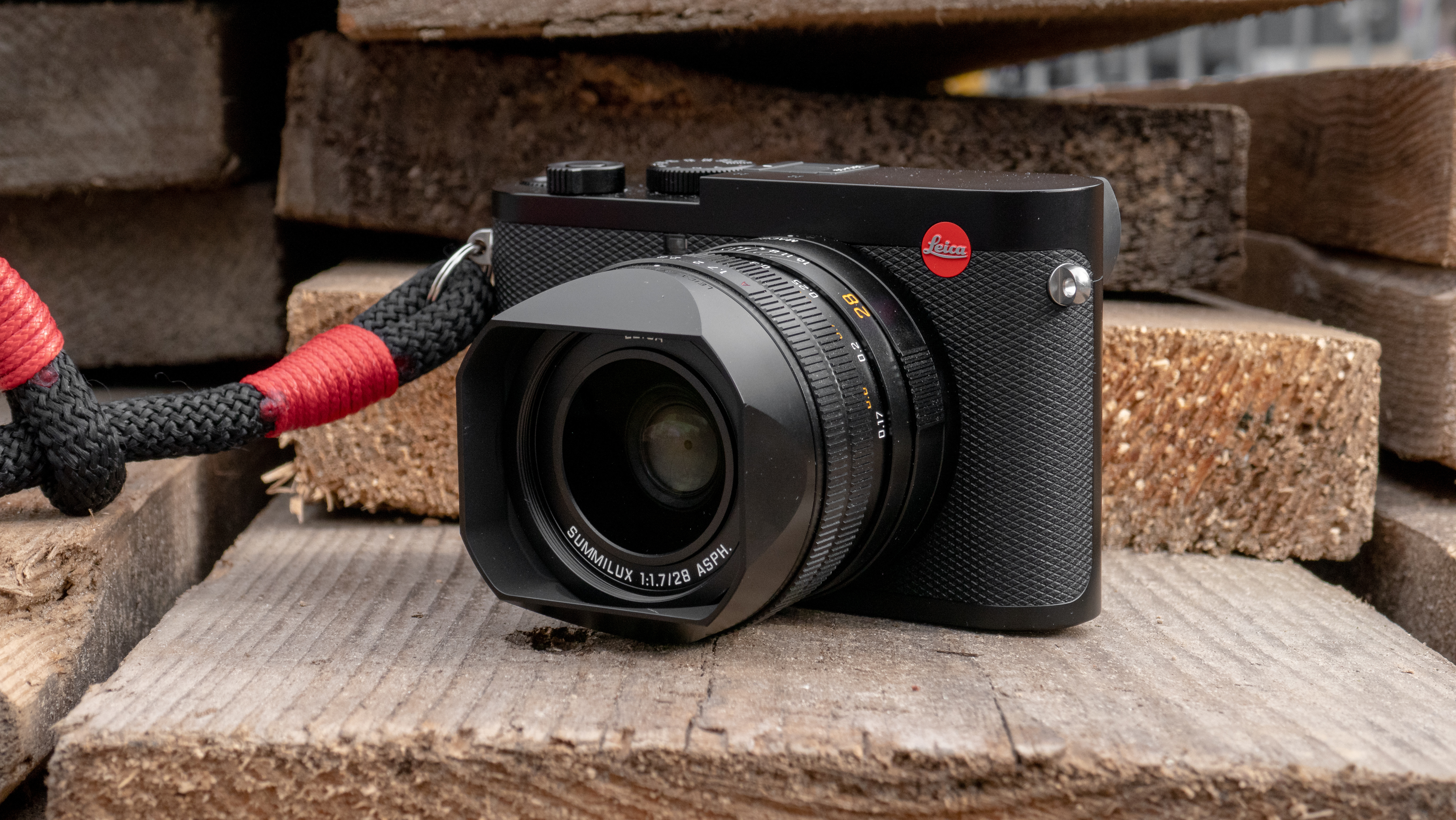

Overview
- Maker: Leica Camera
- Type: Large sensor fixed-lens camera
- Released: 7 March 2019

Lens
- Lens: 28 mm equivalent
- F-numbers: f/1.7 at the widest

Sensor/medium
- Sensor size: 36mm x 24mm (full frame)
- Maximum resolution: 47 MP
- Recording medium: SD, SDHC or SDXC memory card

Flash
- Flash synchronization: 1/2000 s

Shutter
- Frame rate: 10 fps (with mechanical shutter), 20 fps (with electronic shutter)
- Continuous shooting: 10 frames per second

Viewfinder
- Viewfinder: 0.5-inch OLED with 3.68 million dots
- Frame coverage: 100%

Image processing
- Image processor: Maestro II
- White balance: Yes

General
- Video recording: 4K at 24 fps and 30 fps, Full HD at 60 fps and 120 fps
- LCD screen: 3 inches with 1,040,000 dots, touchscreen
- Battery: BP-SCL4
- Made in: Germany

Chronology
- Predecessor: Leica Q
- Successor: Leica Q3

The Leica Q2 is a full-frame fixed-lens camera introduced in 2019. It was succeeded by the Leica Q3 in 2023.

The Q2 itself succeeded the original Leica Q and Leica Q-P. The Q2 has a stabilized 28 mm f/1.7 Summilux lens with digital crop modes corresponding to 35 mm equivalent focal lengths of 35, 50, and 75 mm. The Q2 features a 47.3MP CMOS full frame sensor, measuring 36 x 24 mm. It is capable of DCI and UHD 4K video recording at ISO sensitivities up to 50,000 and a maximum of 10 frames per second with updated autofocus. Also it has IP52-rated dust and water resistance.

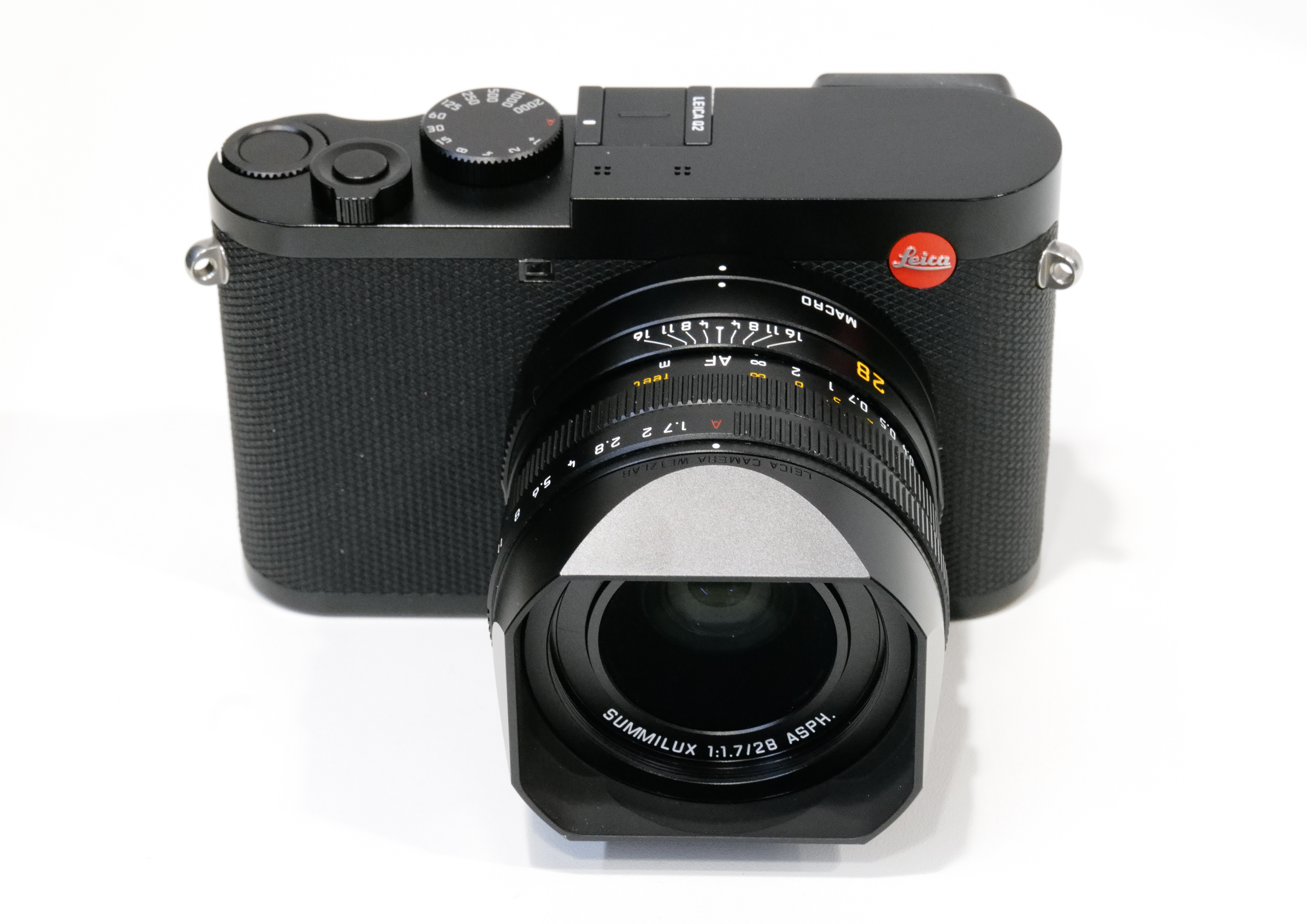
Leica Q2

The Q2 uses Bluetooth Low Energy for connectivity via the Leica FOTOS app, and its battery yields a CIPA rating of 370 shots per charge. The Q2's high resolution OLED electronic view finder has a resolution of 3.68 megadots. The Q2's body includes weather sealing against dust and water spray.

== See also ==
- List of large sensor fixed-lens cameras
- List of retro-style digital cameras
