= Ghost Rider (disambiguation) =

Ghost Rider is the name of several fictional characters appearing in comic books published by Marvel Comics.

Ghost Rider, Ghost Riders, Ghostrider, or Ghostriders may also refer to:

== Fiction ==
=== Marvel Comics comic book series ===
- Ghost Rider (comic book)
- Ghost Rider 2099, under the Marvel 2099 imprint
- Ghost Rider: Road to Damnation, a six-part mini-series under the Marvel Knights imprint

=== Marvel Comics characters ===
- Phantom Rider (originally Ghost Rider), first appeared in 1949
- Ghost Rider (Johnny Blaze), first appeared in 1972
- Ghost Rider (Danny Ketch), first appeared in 1990
- Ghost Rider (Robbie Reyes), first appeared in 2014

=== Films and video games ===
- The Ghost Rider (1935 film), film directed by Jack Jevne
- The Ghost Rider (1943 film), film directed by Wallace Fox
- Ghost Rider (1982 film), short film on bus safety
- Ghost Rider (2007 film), based on the Marvel Comics character Johnny Blaze
  - Ghost Rider (video game), 2007, based on the film
- Ghost Rider: Spirit of Vengeance, 2012 sequel to the 2007 film
- Ghost Rider (2028 film), upcoming Marvel Studios film

=== Television ===
- Marvel's Ghost Rider (TV series), a Hulu original series based on the Marvel Comics character Robbie Reyes
- "Ghost Rider" (Agents of S.H.I.E.L.D. arc), a season 4 story arc
- Johnny Blaze (Agents of S.H.I.E.L.D.), the first Ghost Rider
- Robbie Reyes (Agents of S.H.I.E.L.D.), the second Ghost Rider

=== Other ===
- Doruntine (novel) (AKA The Ghost Rider; originally in Albanian: Kush e solli Doruntinën), by Albanian writer Ismail Kadare

== Military ==
- Ghost Riders, nickname of US Navy Attack Squadron VA-164 1960–1975
- Ghostriders, nickname of US Navy fighter squadron VF-142 1948–1995
- Lockheed AC-130J Ghostrider, a US Air Force gunship

== Music ==
- Ghost Riders (Outlaws album), 1980
- Ghost Riders (Suicide album), 1986

=== Songs ===
- (Ghost) Riders in the Sky: A Cowboy Legend, 1948
- "Ghost Rider" (Suicide song), 1977
- "Ghost Rider", from the 2002 album Vapor Trails by Rush
- "Ghostrider", from the 1991 album Real Life by Simple Minds

== Sport ==
- Carolina Ghostriders, a defunct American indoor football team
- Fernie Ghostriders, a Canadian ice hockey team
- Osceola Ghostriders, a defunct American indoor football team
- Ghost Rider (motorcyclist), Swedish stunt motorcyclist and hooligan

== Other uses ==
- Ghost Rider (shadow), cast on Mount Hosmer, a mountain in British Columbia, Canada
- Ghost Rider: Travels on the Healing Road, a 2002 book by Rush band member Neil Peart
- Ghost Riders (myth), an ancient folk myth
- GhostRider (roller coaster), a wooden roller coaster at Knott’s Berry Farm in California

== See also ==
- "(Ghost) Riders in the Sky: A Cowboy Legend", a 1948 song
- Ghost Riders in the Sky (Slim Whitman album), 1978
- Ghost riding, similar to car surfing
- Bhoot Gari (lit. 'Ghost Ride'), a Hindi play directed by Indian writer Bhisham Sahni
- Ghostwriter (disambiguation)
- Headless Horseman (disambiguation)
