= Ricoh GR Digital II =

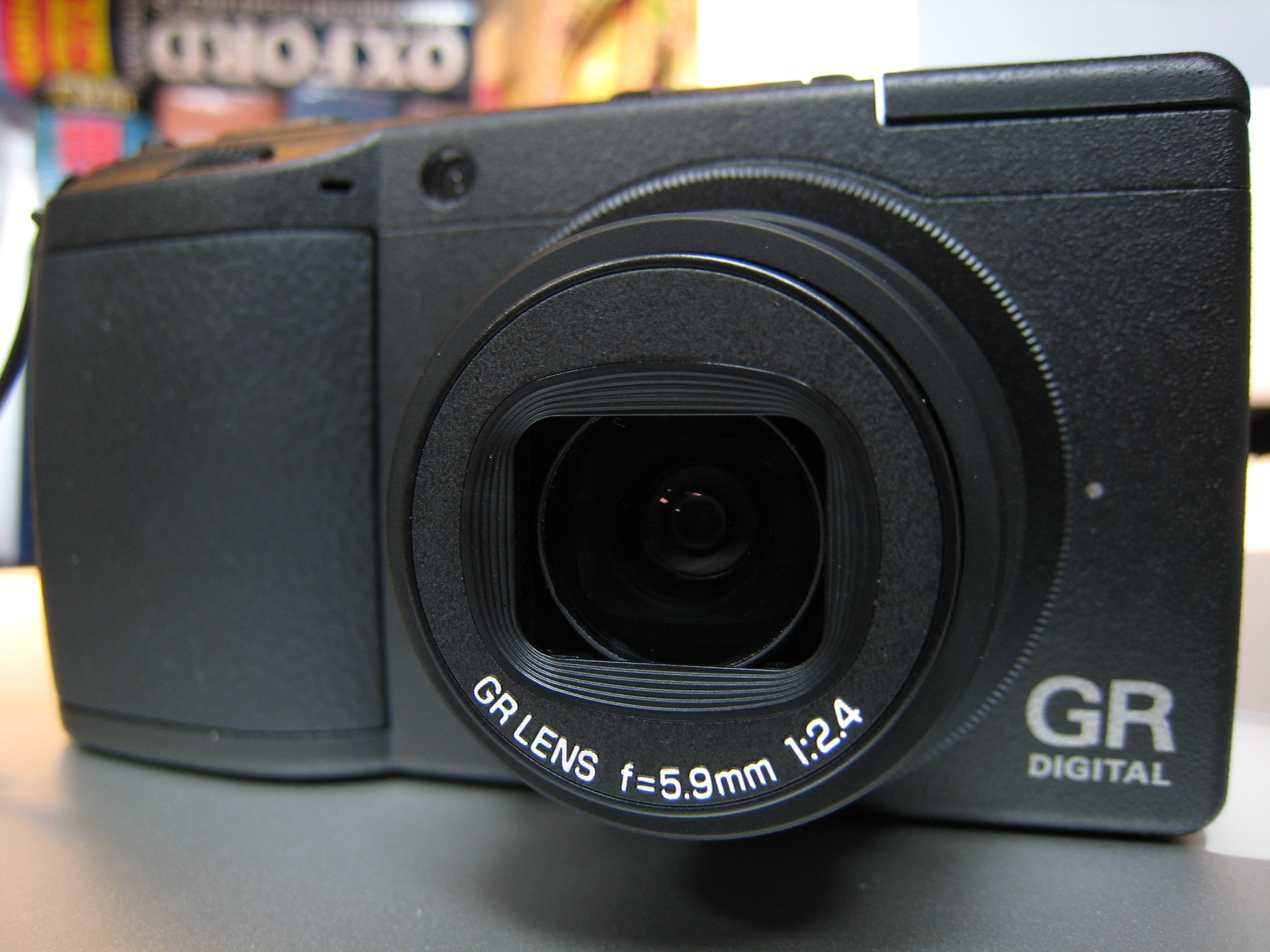
- With lens extended

Overview
- Maker: Ricoh
- Type: Point-and-shoot

Lens
- Lens: 5.9 mm (28 mm equivalent angle of view (AOV) in 35 mm full frame format), f/2.4

Sensor/medium
- Sensor: 1/1.75" primary-color CCD (10.1 megapixels)
- Maximum resolution: 3648 x 2736
- Film speed: 80, 100, 200, 400, 800, 1600
- Storage media: SD card, 54 MB internal memory

Exposure/metering
- Exposure metering: 256 multi-segment, Spot, Center-weighted

Shutter
- Shutter speed range: 180–1/2000 s

Viewfinder
- Viewfinder: External via hotshoe

General
- LCD screen: 2.7" Transparent Amorphous Silicon TFT LCD, approx. 230,000 pixels
- Battery: 1× rechargeable DB-65 battery or 2× AAA batteries
- Dimensions: 107.0 mm x 58.0 mm x 25.0 mm (W x H x D); does not include protruding parts
- Weight: 200 g (7 oz) (with batteries and strap)

The Ricoh GR Digital II is a compact digital camera, the successor of the Ricoh GR Digital and one of a series of Ricoh GR digital cameras.

The GR Digital II first went on sale in Japan at the end of November 2007. It was succeeded by the Ricoh GR Digital III, Ricoh GR Digital IV and Ricoh GR.

Rather than have a zoom lens, instead its lens has a fixed focal length of 5.9 mm (28 mm equivalent angle of view (AOV) in 35 mm full frame format).

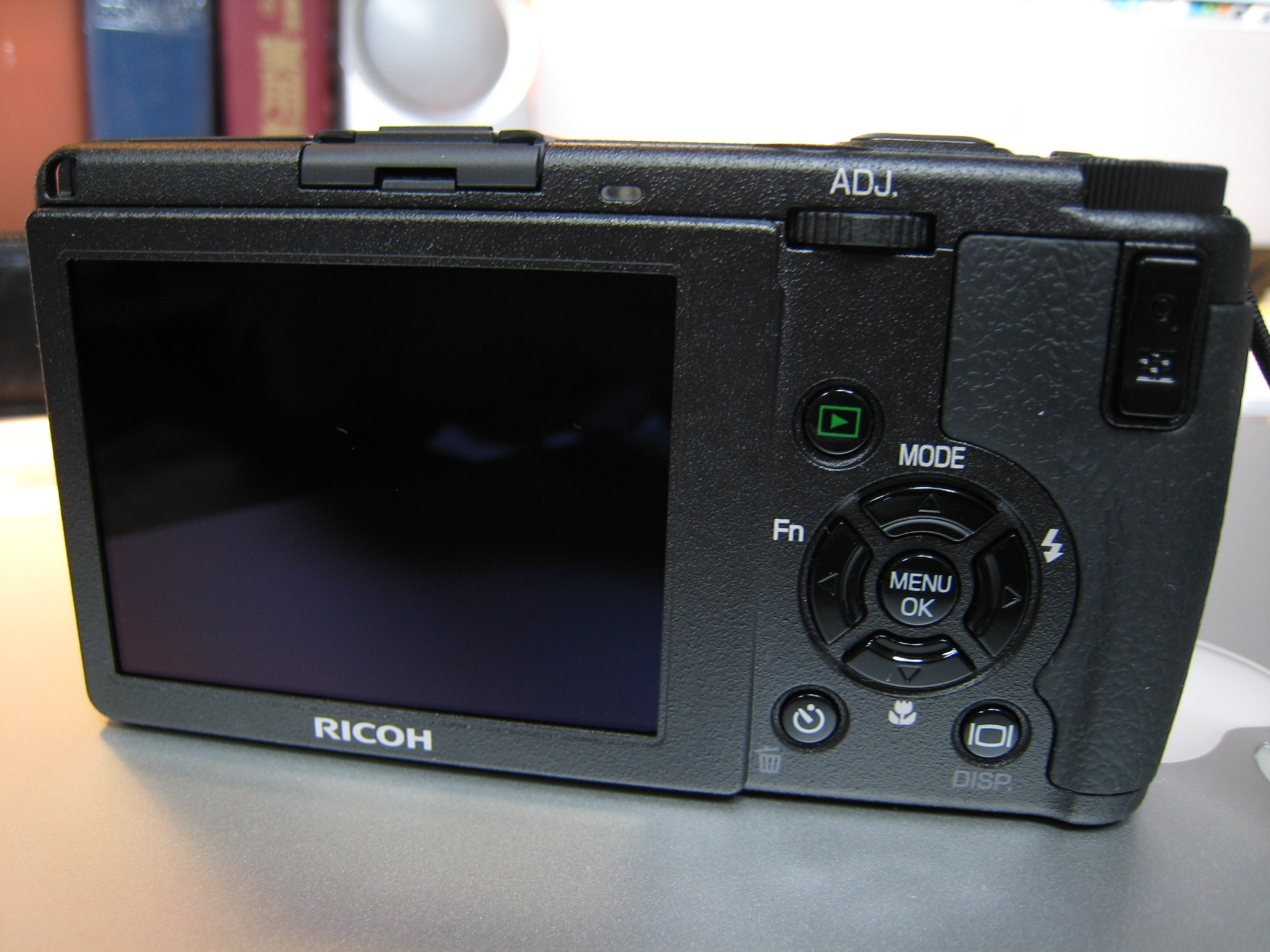
The back

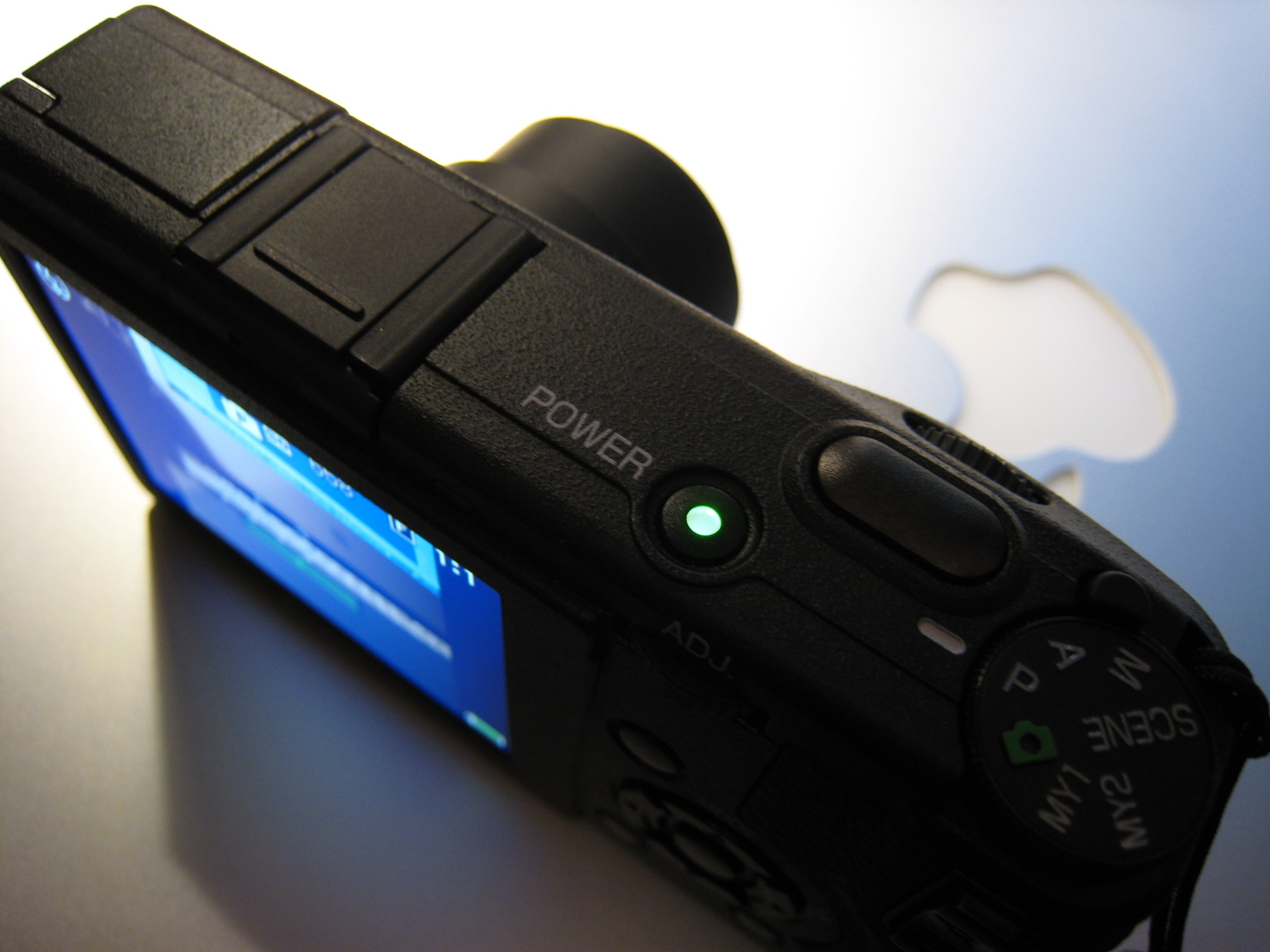
Above and rear, with the lens out

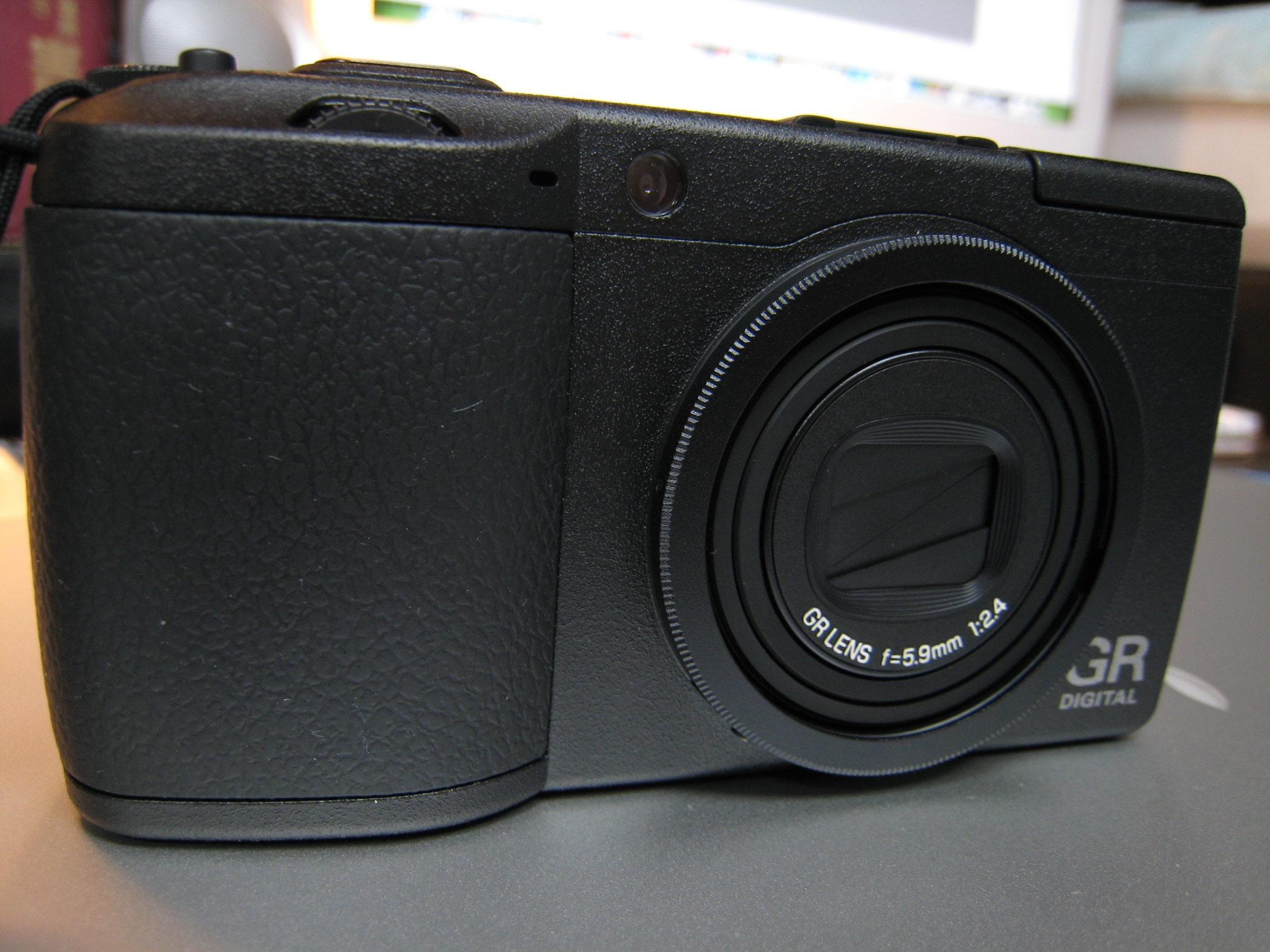
The front, with the lens recessed

== Features ==
- 5.9 mm f/2.4 lens (28 mm equivalent angle of view (AOV) in 35 mm full frame format)
- 10 megapixel CCD image sensor
- Full manual controls
- Magnesium body
- New image processor
- Electronic leveler
- Option for 1:1 (square) aspect ratio
