= Leica Q =

Leica Q (Typ 116)
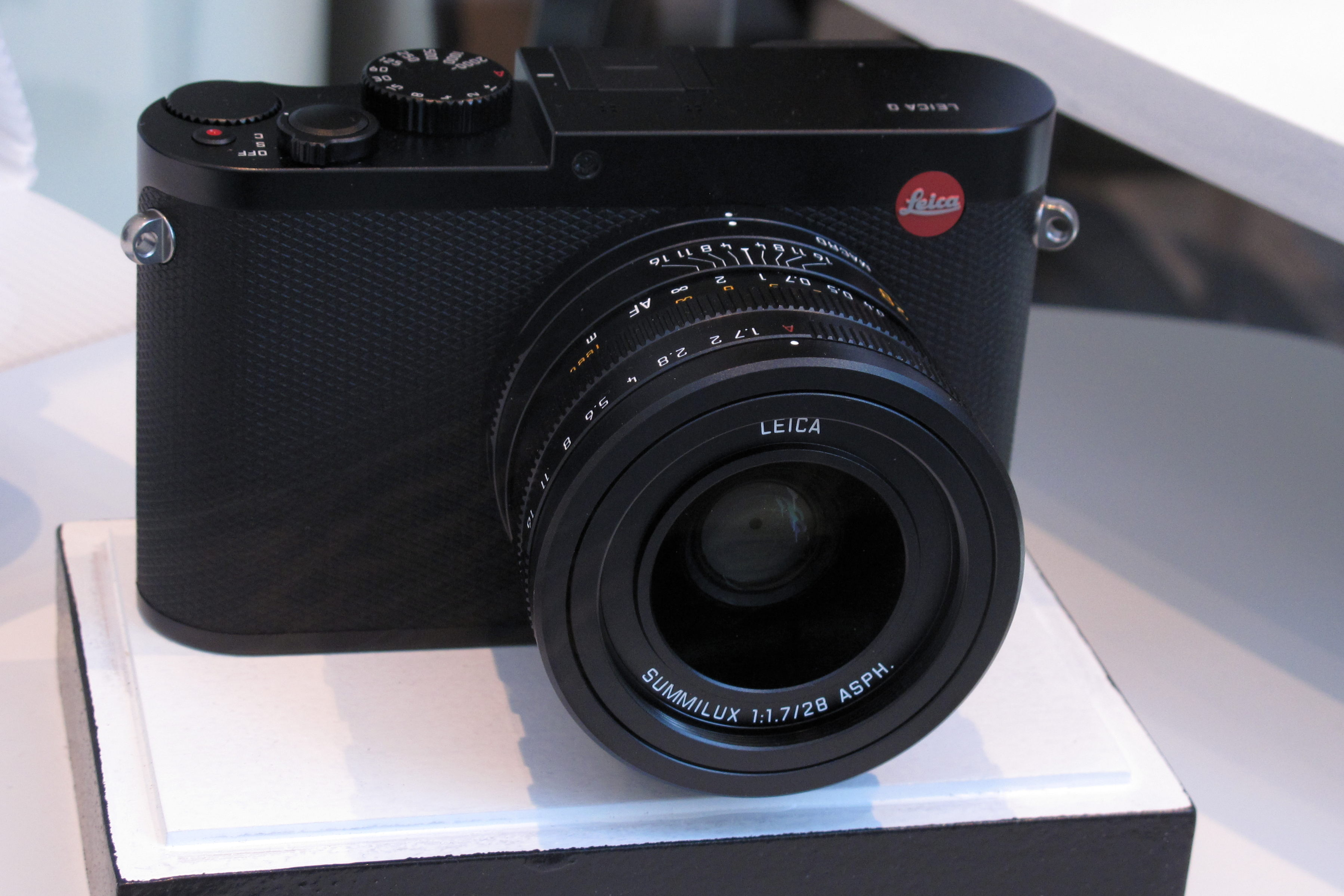

Overview
- Maker: Leica
- Type: Large sensor fixed-lens camera

Lens
- Lens: 28 mm equivalent
- F-numbers: f/1.7 at the widest

Sensor/medium
- Sensor type: CMOS Leica MAX 24MP CMOS Sensor, designed by CMOSIS
- Sensor size: 36mm × 24mm (full frame)
- Sensor maker: STMicroelectronics, Grenoble
- Maximum resolution: 6000 × 4000 (24 megapixels)(RAW Color Depth:14bits)
- Recording medium: SD, SDHC or SDXC memory card

Shutter
- Shutter speeds: 1/16000s to 30s
- Continuous shooting: 10 frames per second

Viewfinder
- Frame coverage: 100%

Image processing
- Image processor: Maestro II
- White balance: Yes

General
- LCD screen: 3 inches with 1,040,000 dots
- Dimensions: 130 × 80 × 93mm (5.12 × 3.15 × 3.66 inches)
- Weight: 640 g (23 oz) including battery
- Made in: Germany

Chronology
- Successor: Leica Q2

The Leica Q (Typ 116) is a full-frame fixed-lens camera announced by Leica on June 10, 2015. The Leica Q2 was announced in March 2019.

== Leica Q ==
=== Specifications ===
- Lens: Leica Summilux 28 mm f/1.7 ASPH.; 11 elements in 9 groups, 3 aspherical elements
- Aperture range: f/1.7 - f/16 in 1/3 EV increments
- Digital zoom values: 1.25× or 1.8× crop modes (35 and 50mm eq.)
- Autofocus type: Contrast-detect AF: Single zone (adjustable), multi-field (49 zones), face recognition, subject tracking, optional setting/shutter release by touching the monitor; Manual focus with focus peaking and magnification available
- Viewfinder: EVF: 3.68M-dot eq. LCoS, 100% coverage, 4:3 aspect ratio, +/-3 diopter, eye sensor

== Leica Q-P ==
The Leica Q-P was announced on 6 November 2018. The Q-P is an update to the original Q but without the Leica's red dot, instead it has the Leica script on the top. The features and technical specifications are similar to the Q, except for a quieter shutter and an improved on/off switch.

== See also ==
- List of large sensor fixed-lens cameras
- List of retro-style digital cameras
