= Roland GR-1 =

Guitar synthesizer produced by the Roland corporation

The Roland GR-1 is a guitar synthesizer that was manufactured by Roland Corporation. It was introduced in 1992.

The GR-1 can be played through a divided pickup/controller (GK-2 or newer, or a guitar with built in divided pickup, like the Godin Multiac) and has MIDI in and out.

The actual synthesizer module sits on the floor and has the appearance of a large effects unit. It is connected to the controller with a 13-pin cable and has six foot pedals for sound switching and bank switching.

The synthesizer features 24 polyphonic voices and has a library of 200 PCM sounds, which can be expanded with an optional expansion board to 400 sounds. The sounds can be tweaked with controls for attack, decay, release, cutoff, resonance and vibrato. Reverb, delay, chorus, or flanging can be added. It also has a built-in audio sequencer of 2000 notes.

== Notable users ==
- Robert Fripp
- Adrian Belew
- Al Di Meola
- Underworld
- Randy Resnick
