= Ricoh GR digital cameras =

Series of digital compact cameras

Ricoh GR Digital & GR
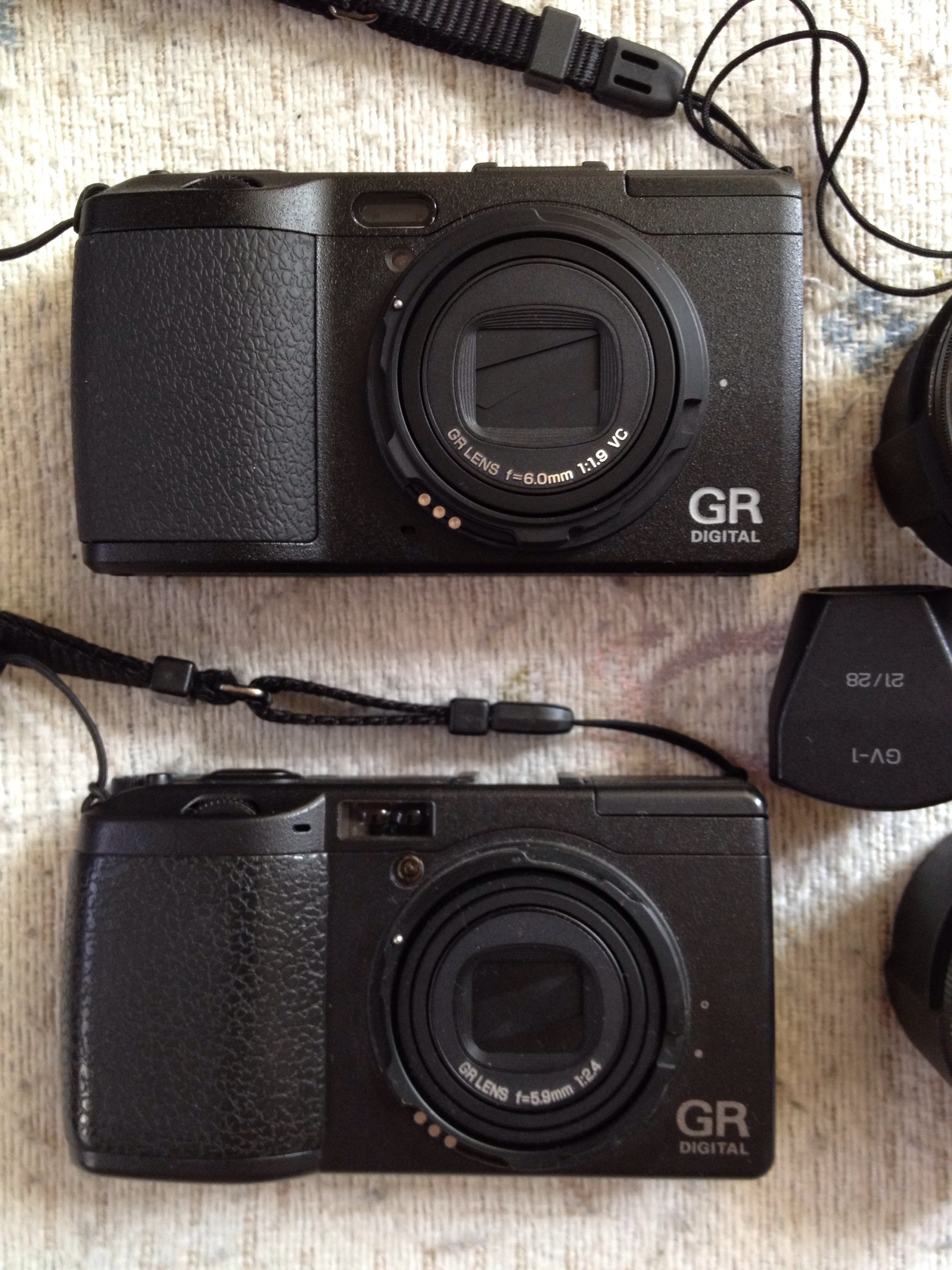
- Ricoh GR Digital IV (top) and GR Digital (bottom); on both cameras, the trim ring bezel has been removed, exposing the bayonet mount for optional lens adaptors. The optional GV-1 optical viewfinder is visible on the right.

Overview
- Maker: Ricoh
- Type: Fixed focal length-lens digital compact
- Released: 2005–2021

Lens
- Lens mount: Fixed
- Lens: 28 mm or 40 mm (equivalent)
- F-numbers: GR Digital nn: f/1.9, 2.4; GR nn: f/2.8

Sensor/medium
- Sensor type: CCD, CMOS
- Sensor size: GR Digital nn: 1/1.8 – 1/1.7"; GR nn: APS-C

Focusing
- Focus: auto, manual

The Ricoh GR is a series of point-and-shoot, or compact, digital cameras made by Ricoh. The GR name was previously used for Ricoh's GR series of film cameras. Like the GR film cameras and Fujifilm X70, the GR digital cameras use metal bodies fitted with bright, permanently-attached prime lenses. In general, the GR digital cameras follow the precedent set by the original GR1 (1996) with lenses that provide a field of view equivalent to a 28 mm wide angle lens on a 35mm film camera.

Specific models include the GR Digital (2005), GR Digital II (2008), GR Digital III (2009), and GR Digital IV (2011), which share similar (small) sensor sizes and lenses; these were followed in 2013 by the GR, which dropped the "Digital" portion of the name and moved to a larger APS-C sensor. Since its release, the GR has been updated as the GR II (2015), GR III (2018), and GR IIIx (2021), which changed the equivalent focal length to 40 mm for the first time. In May 2025, Ricoh announced the GR IV was under development, slated for a fall 2025 launch.

== Overview ==
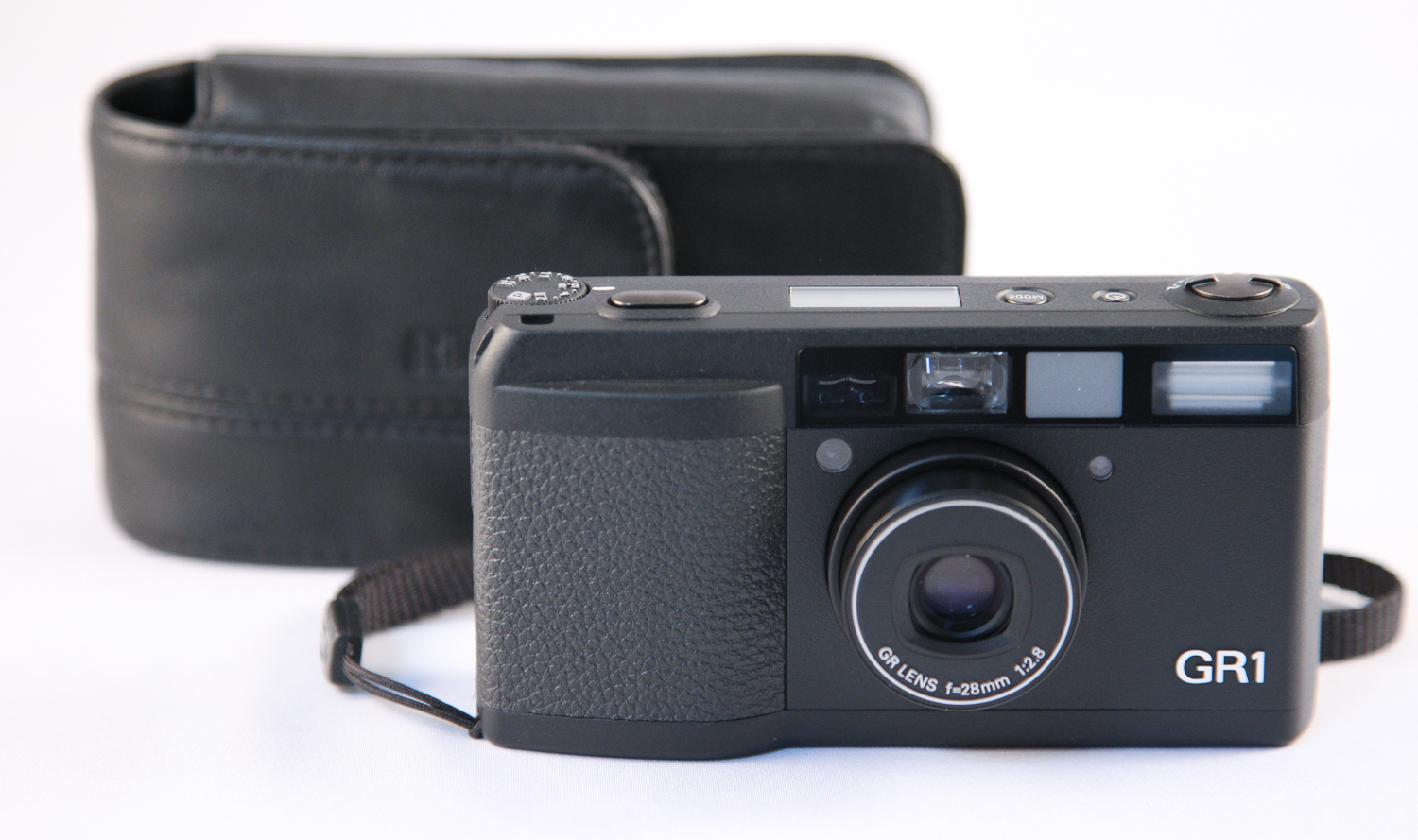
The GR Digital adopted its basic form and functions from the predecessor Ricoh GR1 film camera (1996)

The preceding GR film cameras, released starting in 1996, were popular with Japanese street photographers including Daido Moriyama and the GR Digital line built on this by offering features and settings for street photography. Like the GR film cameras, the GR digital cameras eschew a zoom lens for a fast, fixed wide angle lens.

The first Ricoh GR Digital (GRD, released in 2005) was praised for its "intuitive" control scheme with two dials, similar to a DSLR, allowing direct manipulation of aperture and shutter speed, and "bulletproof, tanklike" build, although the camera was relatively expensive, at a retail price of US$750 (equivalent to $1,210 in 2024). It was fitted with a 28 mm (equivalent) f/2.4 prime lens and small sensor similar to other contemporary compact cameras.

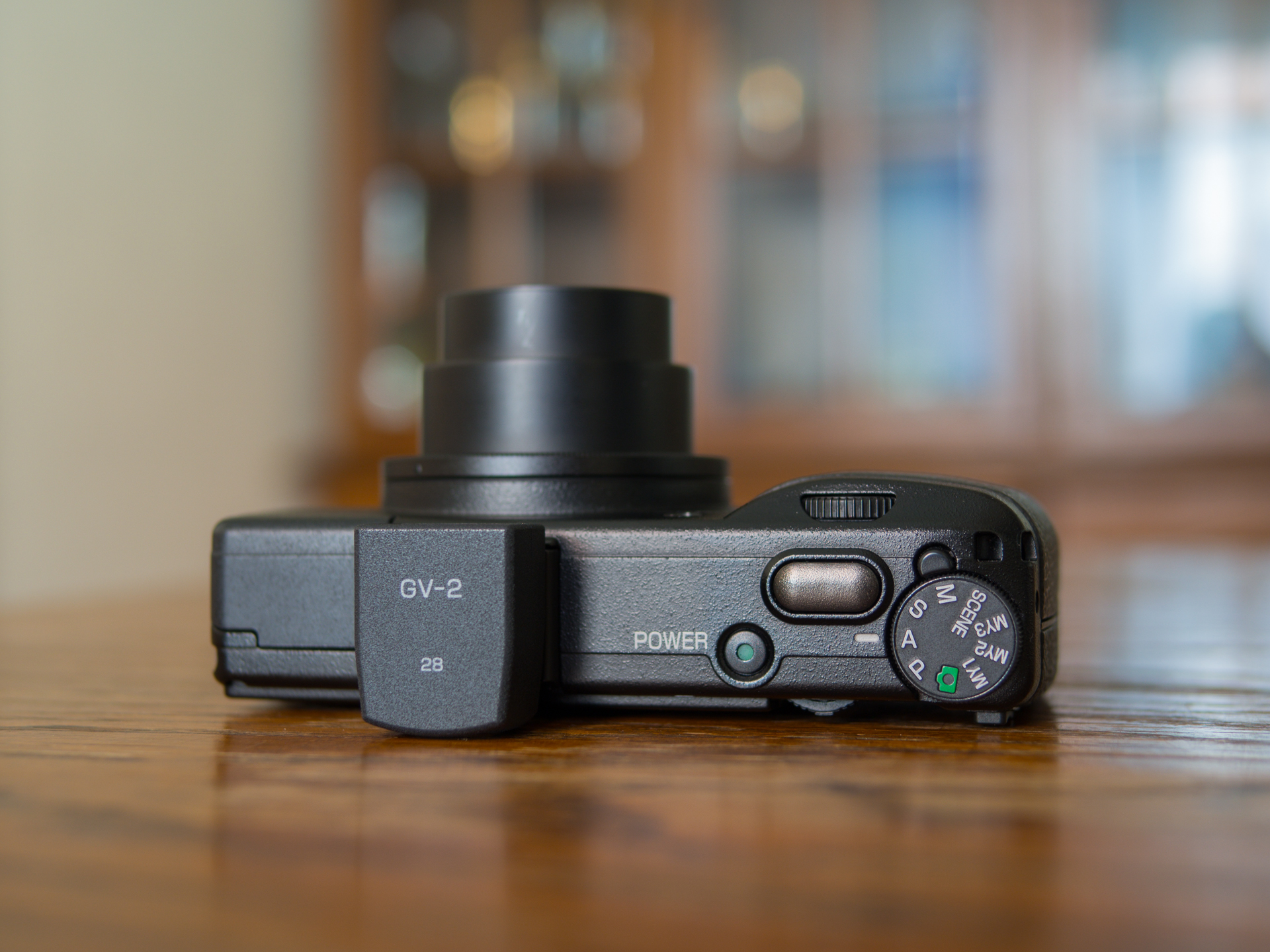
Top view of GR Digital III (2009), with prominent locking exposure mode dial on right, lozenge-shaped shutter release, and twin dial controls: one for the right forefinger (in front of shutter release) and one for the right thumb (on back)

The GR Digital was followed by the Ricoh GR Digital II (2008), with increased resolution and the same lens; the GR Digital III (2009) carried over the sensor and moved to a faster lens, with a maximum aperture of f/1.9, while the GR Digital IV (2011) was fitted with a slightly larger sensor using the same lens. For the first time, a sensor-shift system was added to counteract camera shake. They continued to receive praise for build quality and controls.

A year after the GRD III, Ricoh released the GXR in 2010, which had a slightly larger body than the GRD but was designed to accept interchangeable lens/sensor modules, one of which paired a "GR Lens"-branded 50 mm (equivalent) f/2.5 macro lens with a 12 MP APS-C sensor, comparable in size and resolution to contemporary DSLRs. Later that year, Ricoh released another APS-C module, this time with a 28 mm (equivalent) f/2.5 lens; like the GRD series, the GXR had features oriented for street photography.

Ricoh released the GR (dropping "Digital" from the name) in 2013, as a successor to both the GRD IV and GXR/28 mm. The GR combined a large APS-C sensor and a slightly slower 28 mm f/2.8 lens with the compact body of the GRD series; where the A12 (GXR) 28 mm (equivalent) f/2.5 lens used 9 elements in 6 groups, the GR 28 mm (equivalent) f/2.8 lens has 7 elements in 5 groups. The GR II (2015) added refinements and updates, while the GR III (2018) was a more thorough overhaul, adding touchscreen controls and sensor-shift image stabilization; the GR IIIx (2021) uses a near-normal 40 mm (equivalent) focal length.

Ricoh GR-series digital cameras
Name	Image	Ann.	Lens				Sensor				Dimensions		Notes / Ref.
Name	Image	Ann.	Focal length (35mm equiv.)	Aperture	Min. focus	Constr.	Size	Resolution	Shift-IS	Type	W×H×D	Wgt	Notes / Ref.
Ricoh GR Digital		Sep 2005	5.9 mm (28 mm)	f/2.4–11	0.015 m (0.6 in)	6e/5g	1/1.8"	3264×2448 (8 MP)	No	CCD	107.0 mm × 58.0 mm × 25.0 mm (4.2 in × 2.3 in × 1.0 in)	170 g (6.0 oz)	Anniversary model pictured.
Ricoh GR Digital II	Ricoh GR Digital II with the lens protruding	Oct 2007	5.9 mm (28 mm)	f/2.4–11	0.015 m (0.6 in)	6e/5g	1/1.75"	3648×2736 (10 MP)	No	CCD	107.0 mm × 58.0 mm × 25.0 mm (4.2 in × 2.3 in × 1.0 in)	168 g (5.9 oz)	
Ricoh GR Digital III		Jul 2009	6.0 mm (28 mm)	f/1.9–9	0.01 m (0.4 in)	8e/6g	1/1.75"	3648×2736 (10 MP)	No	CCD	108.6 mm × 59.8 mm × 25.5 mm (4.3 in × 2.4 in × 1.0 in)	188 g (6.6 oz)	
Ricoh GR Digital IV		Sep 2011	6.0 mm (28 mm)	f/1.9–9	0.01 m (0.4 in)	8e/6g	1/1.7"	3648×2736 (10 MP)	Yes	CCD	107.0 mm × 58.0 mm × 32.5 mm (4.2 in × 2.3 in × 1.3 in)	190 g (6.7 oz)	The last "GR Digital" model.
Ricoh GR		Apr 2013	18.3 mm (28 mm)	f/2.8–16	0.1 m (3.9 in)	7e/5g	APS-C (23.7×15.7 mm)	4928×3264 (16.2 MP)	No	CMOS	117 mm × 61 mm × 34.7 mm (4.6 in × 2.4 in × 1.4 in)	215 g (7.6 oz)	
Ricoh GR II		Jun 2015	18.3 mm (28 mm)	f/2.8–16	0.1 m (3.9 in)	7e/5g	APS-C (23.7×15.7 mm)	4928×3264 (16.2 MP)	No	CMOS	117.0 mm × 62.8 mm × 34.7 mm (4.6 in × 2.5 in × 1.4 in)	221 g (7.8 oz)	
Ricoh GR III		Sep 2018	18.3 mm (28 mm)	f/2.8–16	0.06 m (2.4 in)	6e/4g	APS-C (23.5×15.6 mm)	6000×4000 (24 MP)	Yes	CMOS	109.4 mm × 61.9 mm × 33.2 mm (4.3 in × 2.4 in × 1.3 in)	227 g (8.0 oz)(body only)	
Ricoh GR IIIx		Sep 2021	26.1 mm (40 mm)	f/2.8–16	0.12 m (4.7 in)	7e/5g	APS-C (23.5×15.6 mm)	6000×4000 (24 MP)	Yes	CMOS	109.4 mm × 61.9 mm × 35.2 mm (4.3 in × 2.4 in × 1.4 in)	232 g (8.2 oz)(body only)	
Ricoh GR III HDF		Mar 2024	18.3 mm (28 mm)	f/2.8–16	0.06 m (2.4 in)	6e/4g	APS-C (23.5×15.6 mm)	6000×4000 (24 MP)	Yes	CMOS	109.4 mm × 61.9 mm × 33.2 mm (4.3 in × 2.4 in × 1.3 in)	227 g (8.0 oz) (body only)	Replaced the integrated neutral-density filter with a highlight diffusion filter.
Ricoh GR IIIx HDF		Mar 2024	26.1 mm (40 mm)	f/2.8–16	0.12 m (4.7 in)	7e/5g	APS-C (23.5×15.6 mm)	6000×4000 (24 MP)	Yes	CMOS	109.4 mm × 61.9 mm × 35.2 mm (4.3 in × 2.4 in × 1.4 in)	232 g (8.2 oz) (body only)	Replaced the integrated neutral-density filter with a highlight diffusion filter.
Ricoh GR IV	—	Sep 2025	18.3 mm (28 mm)	f/2.8–16	0.06 m (2.4 in)	7e/5g	APS-C (23.3×15.5 mm)	6192×4128 (25.74 MP)	Yes	CMOS	109.4 mm × 61.1 mm × 32.7 mm (4.3 in × 2.4 in × 1.3 in)	228 g (8.0 oz) (body only)	
