= RSG =

RSG may refer to:

- Rabbi Saadia Gaon, 882–942 CE
- Radio Sonder Grense, an Afrikaans radio station in South Africa
- RSG Radio, a Serbo-Croatian radio station in Bosnia and Herzegovina
- Randolph Street Gallery, Chicago, Illinois, US
- Regional seat of government, a UK Cold-War emergency headquarters
- Ready Steady Go!, a 1960s British pop music TV show
- Red supergiant, a kind of star
- Real Sporting de Gijón, a Spanish football team
- Rocket Science Games, a defunct video game developer
- RS Group, entertainment & media company in Thailand
- RS Group plc, electronics & industrial distributor in England
- Ryan Speedo Green, American opera singer
