= Ghost Rider (1982 film) =

- Directed by: Chuck Ungar
- Written by: Chuck Ungar
- Produced by: Chuck Ungar
- Starring: Doug Edmunds; Wendy Taylor
- Cinematography: Ned Faust
- Edited by: Chuck Ungar
- Production company: Open Learning Productions
- Release date: October 12, 1982; (United States)
- Running time: 15 minutes
- Country: United States
- Language: English

Ghost Rider is a US short film on bus safety, shown primarily in American schools in the 1980s. After its re-discovery on the internet in the 21st century, it has become a cult film, thanks to its unusual plotline.

== Plot ==
After enduring his first day of junior high school, Kevin is befriended on the bus ride home by Tracy Donnelly who offers him a sympathetic ear, saying she knows what's it's like to be new. She drops her pencil and Kevin picks it up, only to find that the girl has vanished. Her name is inscribed on the pencil.

While doing his homework Kevin passes his mother the pencil, and she states that the house is full of them - the Donnelly family used to live in the same house, before moving away after their daughter Tracy was killed in a bus accident.

Kevin realizes that Tracy is a ghost and anticipates meeting her again on the bus. Tracy is flirtatious with him, and before disappearing, gives him some homework - a bus safety manual to read. At home, Kevin ignores the leaflet, so Tracy haunts him; moving his weights, changing his radio stations, and fluttering the manual until he agrees to read it, learning emergency procedures as he does so.

The next time Kevin sees Tracy on the bus, she explains that she never read the bus safety manual, so she didn't know how to save herself when there was an accident, and she warns him that he will need to know soon. As she states this, one of the other students sees a pickup truck overtaking dangerously, only to meet another vehicle coming towards them. The school bus is forced off the road and dangles over a cliff, knocking the driver unconscious. Remembering what he'd read, and with some coaching from Tracy, Kevin evacuates the other students before reviving the driver and exiting the bus with him. With no counterweights, the empty bus falls over the cliff and crashes.

The other students hail Kevin as a hero, but he is concerned for Tracy, calling her name until she appears in the distance - only to wave goodbye and fade away again. Upset, Kevin is consoled and led back to the group by two of the students, one of whom was injured in the crash.

== Cast ==
- Doug Edmunds as Kevin
- Wendy Taylor as Tracy Donnelly
- W. Clair King as Bus driver
- Gary Abdullah as Teacher
- Debra Thompson as Kevin's mother

== Cult film ==
With its supernatural/love story plotline, highly unusual for a short film designed to be shown to middle and high school students, Ghost Rider has become something of a cult item in the four decades since it was made. The film gained more attention with its inclusion in the "A/V Geeks" section of the Internet Archive's Moving Pictures Archive; both star Edmunds and writer-director Ungar posted messages on the board, relaying their experiences on making the film. The movie has been downloaded from the archive over 34,000 times as of March 2025. (In the fall of 2010, AV Geeks founder Skip Elsheimer had Edmunds do a voice-over narration of the film for a bus safety video compilation he curated for Kino, which remains unreleased.)

In 2013, RiffTrax, a comedy website that features three of the stars of Mystery Science Theater 3000 (Michael J. Nelson, Bill Corbett, and Kevin Murphy), wrote and performed a comedy commentary track for Ghost Rider, featuring jokes referencing the Nicolas Cage movie, the apparent disparity of the ages between the actors and the teenage characters they portrayed, and the off-screen father's taste for garlic salt.

Doug Edmunds has never appeared in another film (nor have any of the other actors, including co-star Wendy Taylor), but he wound up in show business anyway, as a musician. He co-founded the power-pop band the Gladhands, which released three well-received albums in the 1990s, and continues to write, record and perform to this day. Edumund's latest band project is called The Stars Explode, formed in 2007.
