= Great River Charter Montessori School =

Great River School
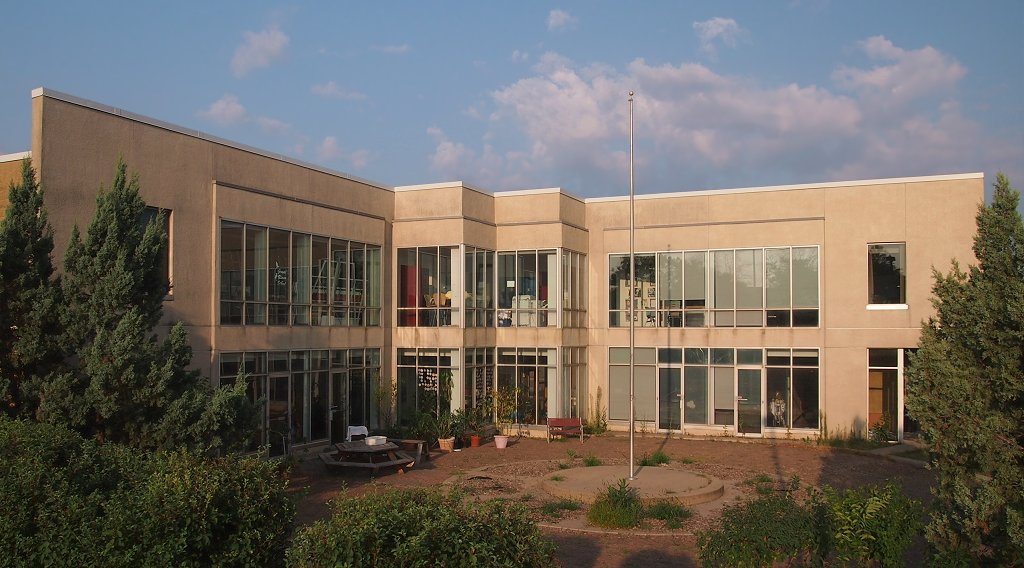

Location
- 1326 Energy Park Drive; Saint Paul, Minnesota 55108; United States
- 44°58′12″N 93°9′19″W

Information
- School type: Montessori charter school w/IB for 11/12 grades
- Grades: 1–12
- Campus type: Urban
- Website: http://www.greatriverschool.org/

Great River School (GRS) is a Montessori charter school in Saint Paul, Minnesota, United States. It functions as a primary, junior high, and high school.

Great River serves 1st through 12th grade and offers the International Baccalaureate program in its 11th and 12th grades.

Great River was also the subject of local news when one of its goats was taken, which is believed to have happened on Monday, June 26, 2023. St. Paul police say that goat remains were found elsewhere on Friday, June 30, and they are suspected to be the goat from GRS.
