= RGS =

RGS is the abbreviation of:

- Burgos Airport, Spain, by IATA airport code
- Congregation of Our Lady of Charity of the Good Shepherd
- Raffles Girls' School (Secondary)
- Redland Green School, Bristol
- Regulator of G protein signaling
- Reigate Grammar School
- Remote Graphics Software, remote desktop protocol by Hewlett Packard
- Restless genital syndrome, also known as persistent genital arousal disorder, a spontaneous, persistent, and uncontrollable genital arousal in women, unrelated to any feelings of sexual desire
- RGS Atalanta, a revival of the Atalanta automobile after the World War II
- Rio Game Show, original name of Brasil Game Show (BGS)
- Rio Grande Southern Railroad, reporting mark RGS
- Ripon Grammar School
- Rockhampton Grammar School
- Rosgosstrakh
- Royal Geographical Society
- Royal Grammar School (disambiguation), several schools in the United Kingdom
- Rangasthalam, 2018 Indian film, abbreviated as RGS
- RGS-008, an early microcomputer based on the Intel 8008
