= GRS Riflestocks =

Norwegian firearm company

GRS Riflestocks is a Norwegian manufacturer of firearm stocks known for their ergonomically shaped rifle stocks. The headquarter and production facilities lie near Grodås in Volda Municipality in Møre og Romsdal county, Norway.

The company originally manufactured furniture since the 1980s, and established itself as a rifle stock manufacturer in 2011 after the 2008 financial crisis. In 2015, GRS Riflestocks was awarded as the company of the year by Innovation Norway.

== History ==
The company was started in 1983 as a furniture factory under the name Grodås Møbler AS by Anne-Lise and Oddvin Haugen. In the beginning the furniture was manufactured in their own house, but in 1985 the production was moved to their own factory premises. During the 1990s, much of the manufacturing was automated using CNC-machines. During the 2000s, their two sons Håvard and Oscar Haugen took over the company. During the 2008 financial crisis, the company struggled. It was decided the company should start manufacturing rifle stocks to gain access to a new market. In 2011, GRS launched its first rifle stocks. As of 2020, the company has over 20 employees, and is represented by distributors in over 45 countries.

== Rifle stock models ==
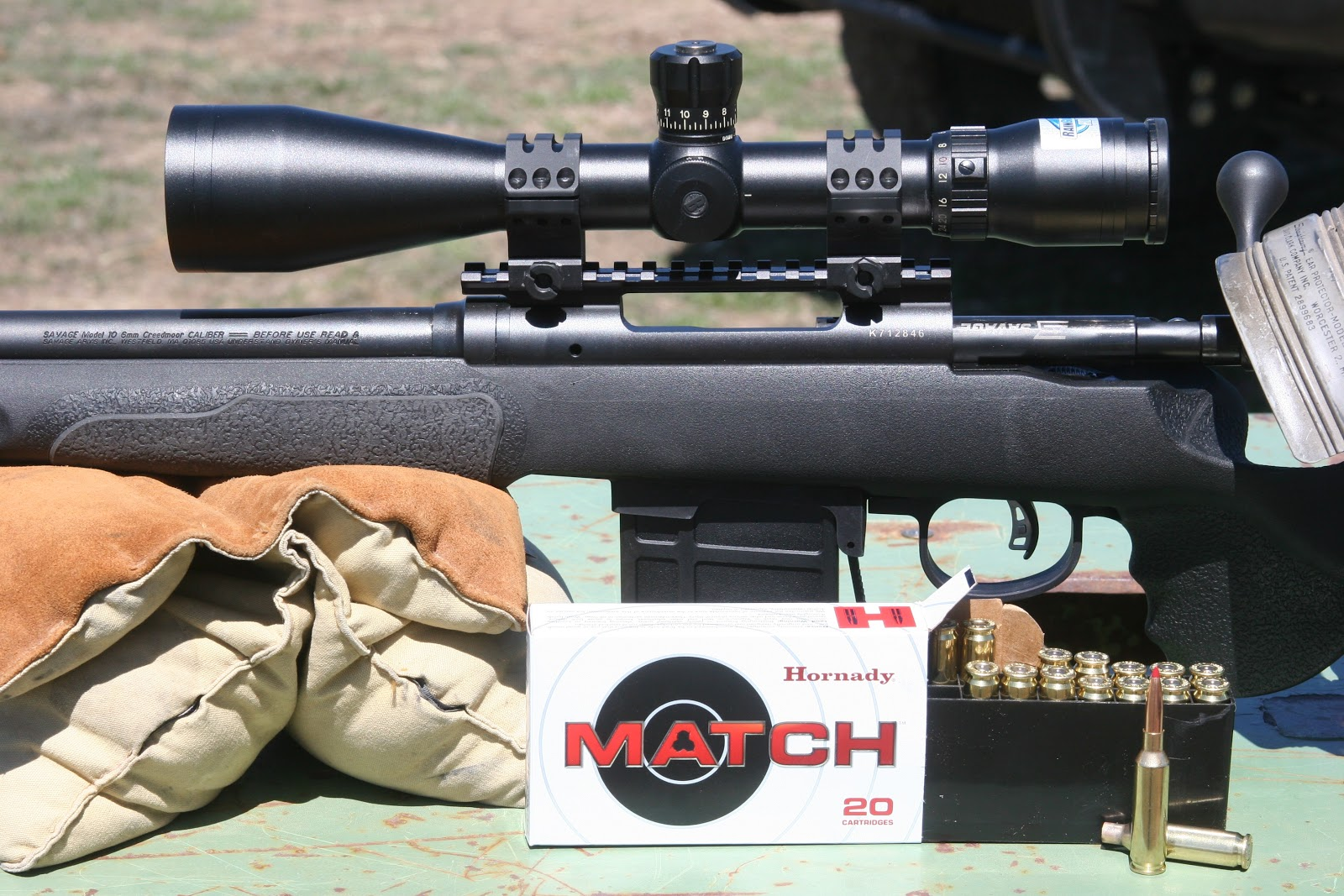
A Savage bolt action rifle with a GRS stock used for long range shooting.

In 2011, GRS launched its first ergonomic laminate stock. Different laminate stock models includes Hunter, Sporter, Hybrid, Varmint and Decima, which have some minor differences in regards to length and shape. All laminate stocks have an adjustable cheekrest and length of pull which GRS calls "speed lock". GRS laminate stocks have been offered with inlets for many different firearm models, as well as in blanks for other models which require inletting by a gunsmith. Inletted stocks have for instance been provided for the Tikka T3 model.

In 2014, the Bolthorn aluminium chassis was launched. It was delivered with options for the SIG Sauer 200 STR/SSG 3000, Remington 700 (Short Action and Long Action), Howa 1500 (Short Action and Long Action), and Tikka T3. Bolthorn uses the same speed lock system as the laminate models. Additionally, the Bolthorn stock has an adjustable pistol grip and uses AICS-magazines.

In 2016, the Bifrost composite stock was launched. The stock is reinforced with glass fiber, and features the speed lock system.

In 2018, the Berserk composite stock was launched. It uses a different composite and a new type of stock adjustment called SpeedLock 2.

In 2019, the Ragnarok and Warg stocks were launched. Ragnarok is a chassis for Blaser R8 and Blaser R93, while Warg is a hybrid stock which fits several other bolt action models. Both stocks feature M-LOK compatible handguards.
