= Fujifilm X70 =

FUJIFILM X70
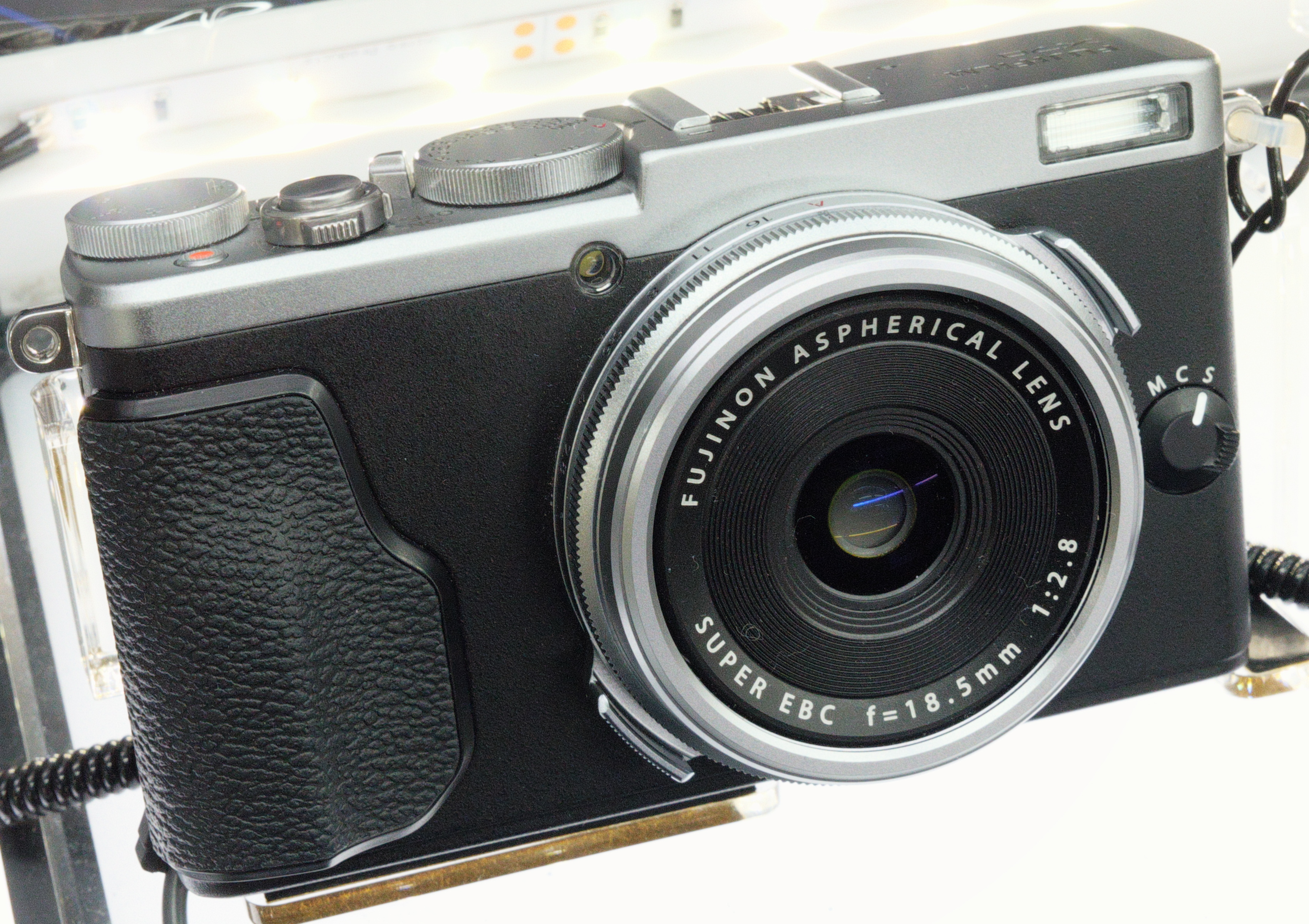

Overview
- Maker: Fujifilm
- Type: Large sensor fixed-lens camera

Lens
- Lens: 18.5 mm f/2.8
- F-numbers: f/2.8 - f/16

Sensor/medium
- Sensor type: X-Trans CMOS II
- Sensor size: 23.6 mm × 15.6 mm (APS-C)
- Maximum resolution: 16.3 megapixels
- Film speed: ISO 200–6400, expandable to 100–51200
- Recording medium: SD, SDHC, SDXC (UHS-I)

Focusing
- Focus: Hybrid TTL contrast detection / Phase detection

Exposure/metering
- Exposure: TTL 256-zones metering

Shutter
- Shutter: Leaf shutter
- Shutter speeds: 30 s to 1/4000 s (mechanical shutter); 1 s to 1/32000 s (electronic shutter)
- Continuous shooting: 8 frames per second

Viewfinder
- Optional viewfinders: Optical viewfinder available as an accessory

General
- Video recording: 1080p at 60p / 50p / 30p / 25p / 24p fps
- LCD screen: 3 inches with 1,040,000 dots
- Battery: NP-95 Li-ion
- Data port(s): USB 2.0, HDMI, 802.11/Wi-Fi
- Dimensions: 112.5 (W) × 64.4 (H) × 44.4 (D) mm
- Weight: 340 g (12 oz) (0.75 lb) (including battery and memory card)

The Fujifilm X70 is an APS-C sensor digital compact camera with an 18.5 mm fixed prime lens (28 mm equivalent angle of view (AOV) in 35 mm full frame format). It is part of Fujifilm's X-Series of cameras. It was announced in January 2016 (along with the Fujifilm X-Pro2) and was released on 18 February 2016.

== Comparison with other Fujifilm cameras ==
Reviewers have noted the X70's similarity to the Fujifilm X100T and to the Ricoh GR II. The X70 combines an X-Trans CMOS II sensor with an EXR processor II, and is the smallest of Fujifilm's cameras to be equipped with the company's APS-C sensor. It shares some technology with the Fujifilm X100T (its sensor and auto focus system) but has a wider angle lens with a slower aperture, is smaller, lacks a built in viewfinder and has a tilting and fully upwards articulating touchscreen display.

== Key features ==
- 16.3 megapixel, APS-C sized X-Trans CMOS II sensor
- Tilting and fully upwards articulating touchscreen display
- Digital teleconverter – 28 mm / 35 mm / 50mm (equivalent angle of view (AOV) in 35 mm full frame format)
- Full HD video / 1080p / 1920 x 1080 at 60p
- ISO 200–6400, expandable to 100–51200
- 1/4000 s (mechanical shutter); 1 s to 1/32000 s (electronic shutter)

== Accessories ==
- VF-X21 hot shoe-mountable optical viewfinder
- WCL-X70 Wide Conversion Lens

== See also ==
- List of large sensor fixed-lens cameras
- List of retro-style digital cameras

Type	Lens	2011	2012	2013	2014	2015	2016	2017	2018	2019	2020	2021	2022	2023	2024	2025
MILC	G-mount; Medium format sensor							GFX 50S ^{F} ^{T}					GFX 50S II ^{F} ^{T}			
MILC	G-mount; Medium format sensor									GFX 50R ^{F} ^{T}						
MILC	G-mount; Medium format sensor										GFX 100 ^{F} ^{T}					GFX 100 II ^{F} ^{T}
MILC	G-mount; Medium format sensor											GFX 100 IR ^{F} ^{T}				
MILC	G-mount; Medium format sensor											GFX 100S ^{F} ^{T}				GFX 100S II^{F} ^{T}
MILC	G-mount; Medium format sensor															GFX Eterna 55^{F} ^{T}
MILC	Prime lens Medium format sensor															GFX 100RF ^{F} ^{T}
MILC	X-mount; APS-C sensor		X-Pro1				X-Pro2				X-Pro3 ^{f} ^{T}					
MILC	X-mount; APS-C sensor								X-H1 ^{F} ^{T}					X-H2 ^{A} ^{T}		
MILC	X-mount; APS-C sensor													X-H2S ^{A} ^{T}		
MILC	X-mount; APS-C sensor											X-S10 ^{A} ^{T}			X-S20 ^{A} ^{T}	
MILC	X-mount; APS-C sensor				X-T1 ^{f}			X-T2 ^{F}		X-T3 ^{F} ^{T}		X-T4 ^{A} ^{T}		X-T5 ^{F} ^{T}		
MILC	X-mount; APS-C sensor						X-T10 ^{f}	X-T20 ^{f} ^{T}		X-T30 ^{f} ^{T}			X-T30 II ^{f} ^{T}			X-T50 ^{f} ^{T}
MILC	X-mount; APS-C sensor									_{15} X-T100 ^{F} ^{T}	X-T200 ^{A} ^{T}					
MILC	X-mount; APS-C sensor			X-E1	X-E2		X-E2s		X-E3 ^{T}			X-E4 ^{f} ^{T}				X-E5 ^{f} ^{T}
MILC	X-mount; APS-C sensor				X-M1 ^{f}											X-M5 ^{A} ^{T}
MILC	X-mount; APS-C sensor				X-A1 ^{f}	X-A2 ^{f}		X-A3 ^{f} ^{T}	_{15} X-A5 ^{f} ^{T}		X-A7 ^{A} ^{T}					
MILC	X-mount; APS-C sensor							X-A10 ^{f}	X-A20 ^{f} ^{T}							
Compact	Prime lens APS-C sensor	X100		X100S		X100T		X100F			X100V ^{f} ^{T}				X100VI ^{f} ^{T}	
Compact	Prime lens APS-C sensor						X70 ^{f} ^{T}			XF10 ^{T}						
Compact	Prime lens 1" sensor															X half ^{T}
Compact	Zoom lens^{2}/_{3}" sensor		X10	X20		X30 ^{f}										
Compact	Zoom lens^{2}/_{3}" sensor				XQ1	XQ2										
Compact	Zoom lens^{2}/_{3}" sensor			XF1												
Bridge	^{2}/_{3}" sensor		X-S1 ^{f}													
Type	Lens															
Type	Lens	2011	2012	2013	2014	2015	2016	2017	2018	2019	2020	2021	2022	2023	2024	2025
