= Smart green resilient =

Emerging planning approach

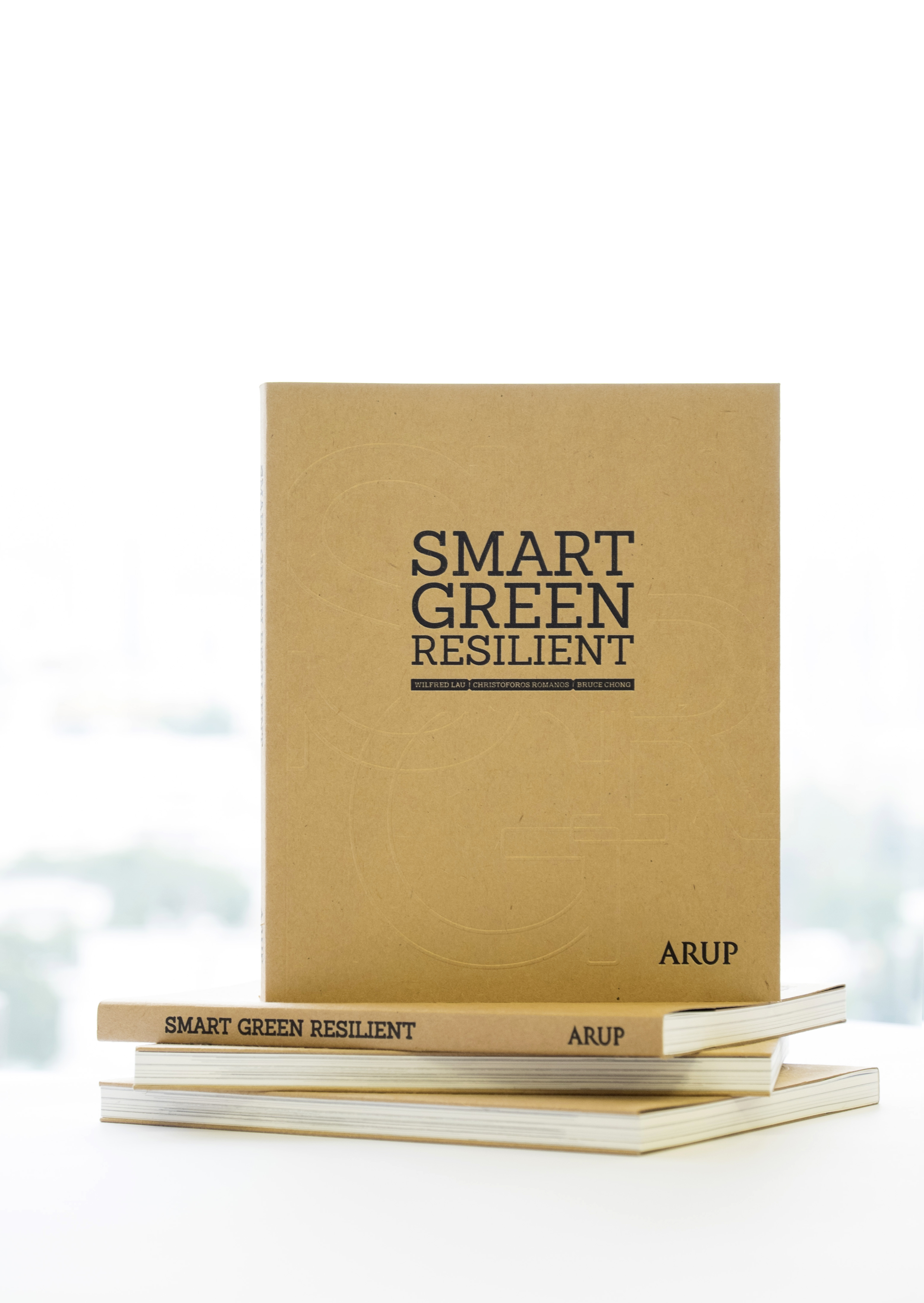
Book cover of the book "Smart Green Resilient"

Smart Green Resilient, also known as SGR, refers to an emerging planning approach that aims to enable pragmatic concerns to be addressed simultaneously with major environmental issues and to structure long-term resilience in urban planning strategies, masterplans and sustainability frameworks for a wide range of contexts. SGR was developed in the Arup Hong Kong office and is derived from design practice, observations and collective research on East Asia’s energetic urbanisation and is now regarded as a key component of Hong Kong's city strategy.

The SGR planning approach is based on observations of East Asia’s rapid urbanisation processes that have left many cities and landscapes in the region vulnerable to climate change, environmental degradation and socioeconomic fluctuations. The approach espouses the holistic resolution of critical issues pertinent to contemporary cities with an equal focus on the organization of urban systems and their management as well as physical design (including infrastructure and buildings.)

According to recent public discussions on the merits of SGR, the combined use of the terms “smart”, “green” and “resilient” is derived from the proliferation similar terminologies in current urban practice aiming to guide the transformation of urban environments into “Smart Cities”, “resilient cities” or combinations thereof. However, SGR does not aim to replace other planning approaches but instead is considered necessary to coordinate the often multidisciplinary nature of collaborative city-building and to maximize benefits to urban residents, businesses and governments.

== History ==
The key ideas behind SGR were initially conceived in 2008 and formally consolidated in January 2014. The phrase “Smart Green Resilient” (or “SGR”) first appears in this form to describe the holistic planning approach employed to advise the government of Taoyuan on the strategic master plan for North Taiwan’s Taoyuan Aerotropolis. Since then SGR has been the subject of lectures, presentations and research papers outlining the concerns as well as the solutions and direction that urban planning should adopt.

Published in 2015, the book entitled Smart Green Resilient, traces the development of the concept since 2008 beginning with the Ninh Thuan Integrated Development Plan and followed by the planning study for Hong Kong’s Lok Ma Chau Loop based on smart city and sustainable development principles. The book summarises the growth of environmental awareness and the different ways cities and planners have responded to these escalating challenges over the recent past. The book also outlines some of the main elements that characterise the SGR approach, various applications in project work and sources of inspiration from global geographies.

As of 2016-2017, the phrase “Smart Green and Resilient” has been adopted by Hong Kong’s Planning Department and Development Bureau to describe the 2030+ planning vision for the city. Reference to Smart Green Resilient is also made in relation to the New Territories North development in Hong Kong, where the approach is intended to enable "a low-carbon environment equipped with smart city infrastructure and technology."

In 2022, Arup’s Smart-Green-Resilient approach for the New Territory North (NTN) project in Hong Kong won the Grand Award at the International Society of City and Regional Planners (ISOCARP) Award of Excellence. The jury commented that the SGR approach “serves as an exemplary model for leveraging smart planning methodologies” and the NTN project would “contribute to future development strategies and project standards in the region.”

== Themes ==
The SGR planning approach is characterized by various themes that range from identification of critical urban issues to their collaborative resolution, usually by large multidisciplinary groups that can include engineers, residents, economists, city administrators, environmentalists etc.

=== Current Planning Solutions ===
A key thesis of SGR involves the limitations inherent in current planning approaches including Smart City, Resilient City, Ubiquitous City, Wise City etc. While there are merits in each of these directions, none of them present a holistic design system that takes into consideration the complexity of urban networks and their social, economic and cultural dimensions. This lays the groundwork for an alternative approach to urban planning that can shed light into wider issues and incorporate comprehensive solutions that are intended to multiply the benefits for city residents. In the SGR approach for example, the term “resilience” is not limited to climate adaptation but equally embraces the adaptability of physical infrastructure as well as economic and social resilience.

=== Cognitive Prism ===
SGR is not intended to present a prescriptive methodology for urban planning. In contrast to many urban planning approaches, SGR seeks to reveal the relationships between critical issues by interrogating already identified concerns through different lenses. As such SGR is described as a “cognitive prism” through which “urban planners can gain a holistic view of the challenges they need to address.”

=== Three Elements of SGR ===
Three important elements characterize the SGR planning approach.

- People Oriented that advocates designing for end users, the need to broaden stakeholder engagement, formulate broad alliances with concerned parties and realize community benefits;
- Contemporary Relevance espousing the importance of addressing current issues through the use of a composite systems approach that can lay the foundation for a structured long-term implementation as well as revealing territorial relationships;
- Future Proofing that supports capacity-building, the utilization of appropriate technology and scenario-testing to secure plans have adequate built-in flexibility to adapt under various conditions.

== See also ==
Over the recent past, researchers, industrial practitioners, bloggers, and interested groups have also promulgated their thoughts around concepts that utilize the terms “smart”, “green” and “resilient” by combining “S”, “G” and “R” into “SG”, “SR” or GR”. These do not form part of the SGR planning approach.
