= GR2 =

GR2 may refer to:

- GR2 Records, a record label
- GR2, A fictional giant robot from the 1967 manga Giant Robo

== See also ==
- Ghost Rider: Spirit of Vengeance, a 2012 sequel to the film Ghost Rider
- Gravity Rush 2, a 2017 video game
