= Ricoh GR (large sensor compact camera) =

Digital camera model

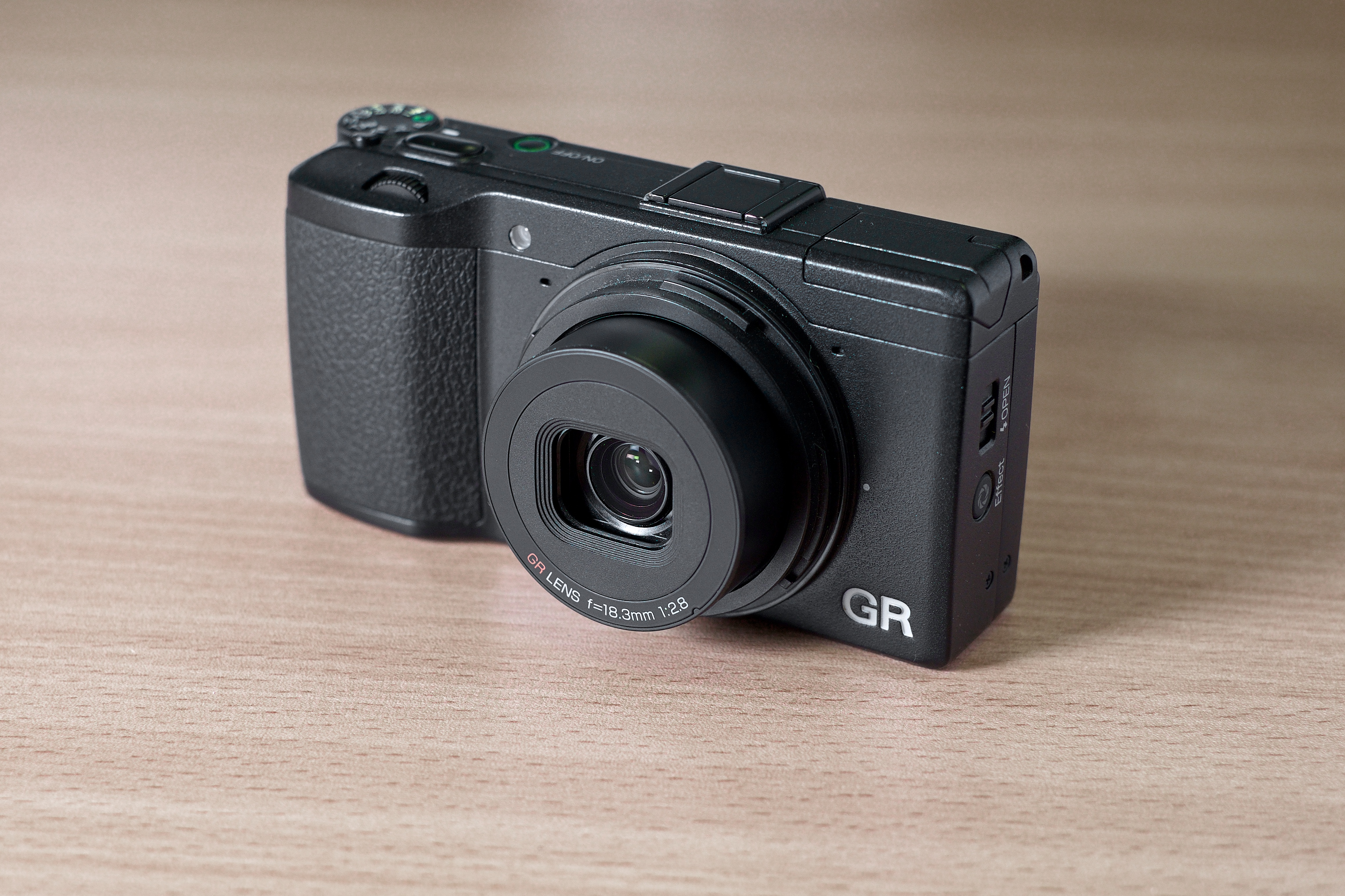

Overview
- Maker: Ricoh
- Type: Large sensor fixed-lens camera

Lens
- Lens: 28 mm equivalent
- F-numbers: f/2.8 at the widest

Sensor/medium
- Sensor type: CMOS
- Sensor size: 23.7 x 15.7 mm (APS-C type)
- Maximum resolution: GR, GR II – 4928 x 3264 (16 megapixels) GR III, GR IIIx, GR III HDF – 6000 x 4000 (24 megapixels) GR IV, GR IV HDF, GR IV monochrome– 6192 x 4128 (26 megapixels)
- Film speed: 100-25600
- Recording medium: SD, SDHC, SDXC

Shutter
- Shutter speeds: 1/4000 s to 300 s
- Continuous shooting: 4 frames per second

Viewfinder
- Optional viewfinders: Optical viewfinder available as an accessory

Image processing
- White balance: Yes

General
- LCD screen: 3 inches with 1,230,000 dots
- Dimensions: 117 x 61 x 34.7 mm (4.61 x 2.4 x 1.38 inches)
- Weight: 245 g (9 oz) including battery

The Ricoh GR is a digital large sensor compact camera announced by Ricoh on April 17, 2013, one of a number of Ricoh GR digital cameras. It was succeeded by the Ricoh GR II in 2015, the Ricoh GR III in 2019, the GR IIIx in 2021 and the GR IV in 2025.

== Ricoh GR ==
Unlike its predecessors (the "GR Digital" series), the Ricoh GR incorporated an APS-C image sensor, while retaining a relatively compact form factor. Coupled with its retractable lens, the GR is potentially the slimmest of any camera in its class when powered off. Aside from portability, reviewers praised the GR for its lens quality and ergonomics.

An unusual feature of the Ricoh GR was its built-in ND filter. Its maximum shutter speed was variable, depending on the aperture setting (ie, 1/4000s was only available at apertures smaller than f/5.6).

The Ricoh GR series has been compared against the Nikon Coolpix A and the Fujifilm X70, other large sensor compacts with the same fixed focal length (28mm).

== Ricoh GR II ==
DPReview said that over the Ricoh GR, the GR II is "a fairly minor update ... the camera isn't a dramatic update ... the core of the camera remains the same".

=== New features ===
- 802.11/Wi-Fi – to remotely control the camera as well as providing the option to transfer images from the camera to a mobile device or computer
- NFC
- Maximum shutter speed when shooting at f/2.8 increased by 1/3 EV to 1/2500 s
- Can shoot 10 raw frames at its maximum shooting rate of 4 fps (up from 4 raw frames)
- Can save either individual raw files or a composite raw file when shot in interval mode
- Autofocus during movie shooting
- Option to trigger movie shooting across Wi-Fi, using the browser-based GR Remote app
- Seven additional effect modes for JPEGs
- An extra 'Color Temperature Extension' white balance mode
- The internal flash can be used to remotely operate Pentax AF360 and AF540 flashguns as slaves
- Tap (half-press) the shutter to enter shooting mode if the camera has been turned on by holding the playback button, which previously required a full press

== Ricoh GR III ==
The Ricoh GR III was announced as "under development" on September 25, 2018, immediately prior to Photokina that year. The camera was released in March 2019.

While the GR II was seen as an incremental upgrade, the GR III was the result of a longer development cycle and boasted more significant changes. Ricoh indicated that several key components, including the sensor and the lens, would be upgraded. The body dimensions would decrease slightly, with the built-in flash removed. As July 30, 2020, a new firmware version was released.

=== New features ===
- Sensor resolution increased from 16 MP to 24 MP
- Redesigned lens (6 elements, 4 groups)
- Three-axis sensor-shift image stabilization
- Expanded ISO range of 100 to 102,400 (2 stops higher than the GR II's max of 25,600)
- More compact design (note: on-board flash removed)
- Simulate an anti-aliasing filter (first seen on the Pentax K-3)
- Dust reduction system "using ultrasonic vibrations" (named "DR II")
- Autofocus upgraded to a hybrid system, with phase detection used in combination with contrast detection
- Capacitive touch screen
- Minimum focusing distance improved to 6 cm from 10 cm
- Video recording frame rate improved to 60 fps at 1080p (Full HD)
- USB-C connectivity that can be used to charge the battery

== Ricoh GR IIIx ==
The Ricoh GR IIIx was announced in September 2021. The camera was released the same month. An incremental update from the GR III, the GR IIIx includes a new 26.1mm lens.

== Ricoh GR IV ==
The updates to the GR IV were seen as rather incremental, as it retained most of the GR III's styling and features with numerous small changes and updates.

=== New features ===
- New 25.7 MP backside-illuminated sensor, up from the GR III's front-illuminated 25 MP sensor
- Redesigned lens (7 elements, 5 groups) with faster startup time and improved dust resistance
- Upgraded five-axis sensor-shift image stabilization (up from three-axis on the GR III)
- Improved autofocus performance due to faster lens movement and new image processor
- Expanded ISO range of 100 to 204,800 (1 stop higher than the GR III's max of 102,400)
- New 40% larger battery (DB-120)
- Increased internal storage (53 GB) and switch to microSD cards
- Rear scroll wheel relocated from the d-pad to the top right where the exposure compensation rocker used to be
- Exposure compensation rocker replaced with two vertical buttons

== Model differences ==
Model	GR	GR II	GR III	GR IIIx	GR IV
Sensor	16 MP, CMOS, APS-C		24 MP, CMOS, APS-C		25.7 MP, BSI CMOS, APS-C
Lens specification	18.3mm f/2.8 (Equiv. 28mm)			26.1mm f/2.8 (Equiv. 40mm)	18.3mm f/2.8 (Equiv. 28mm)
Shutter speed	300 ~ 1/4000 sec (1/2000 at f/2.8)	300 ~ 1/4000 sec (1/2500 at f/2.8)	30 ~ 1/4000 sec (1/2500 at f/2.8)		
AF type	Contrast Detect		Phase Detect and Contrast Detect		
Built-in flash	Yes		No		
Image stabilization	No		Yes, 3-axis		Yes, 5-axis
Dust reduction system	No		Yes		
Wi-Fi connectivity	No	Yes			
Dimensions	117 x 61 x 35 mm	117 x 63 x 35 mm	109 x 62 x 33 mm	109 x 62 x 35 mm	109.4 x 61.1 x 32.7 mm
Weight	245 g	251 g	257 g	262 g	
Announcement date	April 2013	June 2015	September 2018	September 2021	September 2025

== GR II Accessories ==
- GW-3 21mm-equivalent wide-angle adapter / lens
- GM-1 macro conversion lens

== See also ==
- Ricoh GR digital cameras
- Ricoh GR film cameras
- List of large sensor fixed-lens cameras
