= Ricoh GR Digital =

Digital camera model

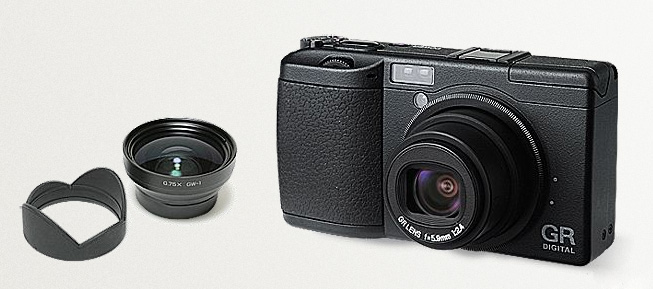

Overview
- Type: Point-and-shoot

Lens
- Lens: 28 mm (in 35 mm full frame equivalent) f/2.4

Sensor/medium
- Sensor: 1/1.8" CCD (8.1 Megapixels)
- Maximum resolution: 3264 × 2448
- Film speed: 64, 100, 200, 400, 800, 1600 (not available in RAW mode)
- Storage media: SD card, 26 MB internal memory

Exposure/metering
- Exposure metering: 256 multi-point, Spot, Center-weighted

Shutter
- Shutter speed range: 180–1/2000 s

Viewfinder
- Viewfinder: External via hotshoe

General
- LCD screen: 2.5" TFT LCD, 210,000 pixels
- Battery: 1 rechargeable D-60 battery or 2 AAA batteries
- Dimensions: 107 mm × 25 mm × 58 mm (4.21 in × 0.98 in × 2.28 in)
- Weight: 200 g (7.1 oz) (with batteries and strap)

The Ricoh GR Digital is a compact digital camera made by Ricoh since 2005.

First announced at photokina 2004, it went on sale in Japan on 21 October 2005. The GR Digital is Ricoh's digital successor to their 35 mm GR series film cameras and the first in a series of Ricoh GR digital cameras.

Unlike most similar cameras, it lacks a zoom lens, instead having a fixed focal length of 5.9 mm (or 28 mm, in 35 mm full frame equivalent).

== 1st Anniversary Limited Edition ==
The GR 1st Anniversary Limited Edition of 2006 has a body covered with a blue sky and clouds, and drawings of angels, by Katsuya Terada. Production was limited to 1000 cameras worldwide. It is functionally identical to the standard GR D except for the startup/shutdown screens.

== See also ==
- Point-and-shoot camera
- Wide-angle lens
