= Konica C35 AF =

First mass-produced autofocus camera

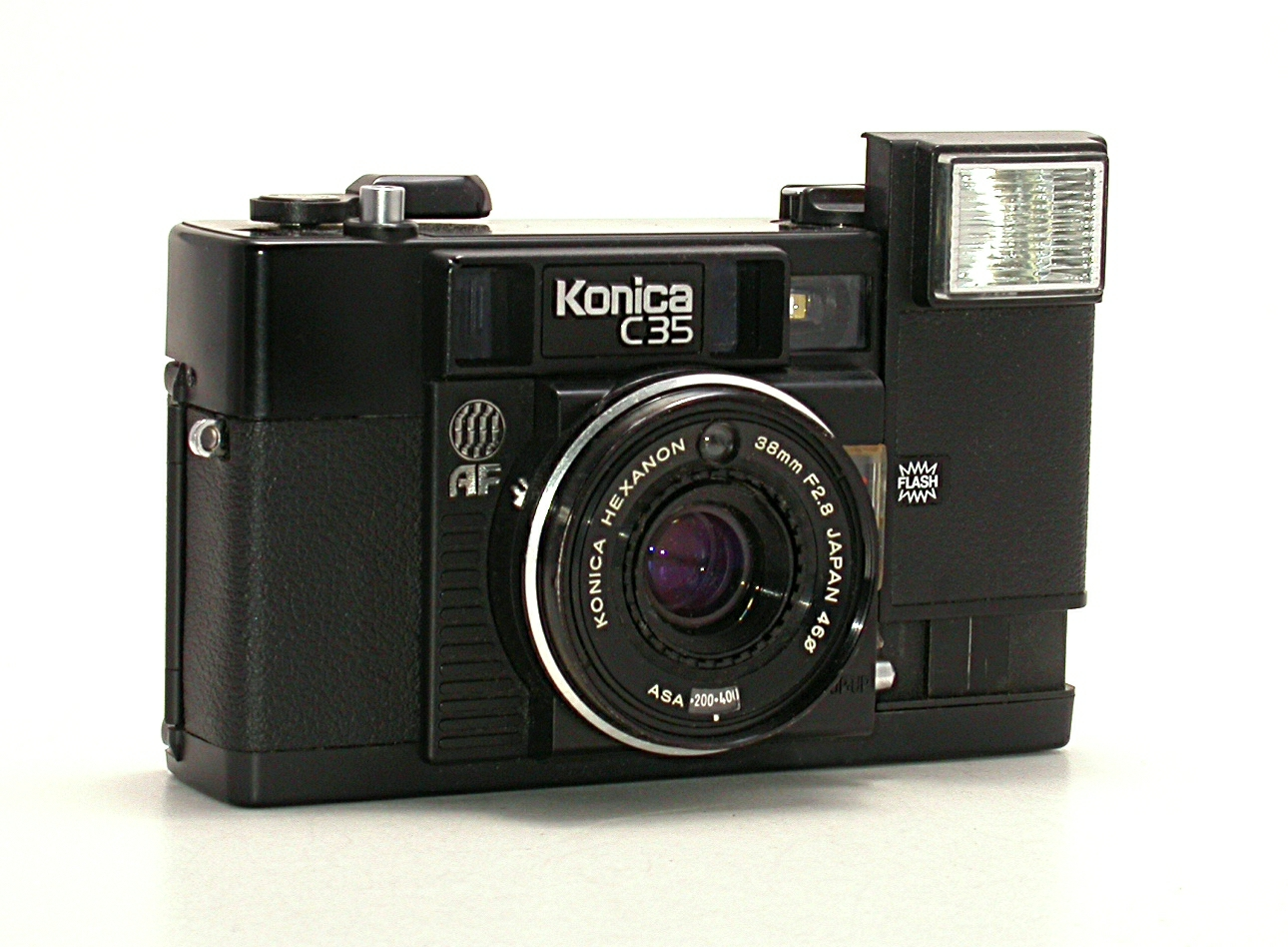
Konica C35 AF

The Konica C35 AF, released in November 1977, was the first mass-produced autofocus camera.

== Features ==
This was an autofocus version of the Konica C35 Automatic camera. It featured a fixed-aperture Hexanon 38 mm f/2.8 autofocus lens with a leaf shutter, a built-in electronic flash, and an automatic exposure system to select the appropriate shutter speed. The film advance was mechanical.

The shutter was electronically controlled with three speeds, 1/60, 1/125, and 1/250. The exposure system could handle film speeds from ISO 25 to ISO 400 and the built in flash had a guide number of 14 at ISO 100 covering distances from 1.1m to 5m.

This camera was the first mass-produced camera with built in autofocus and used a system with an electronic version of a split-image rangefinder.
