= Canon A35F =

35mm rangefinder camera

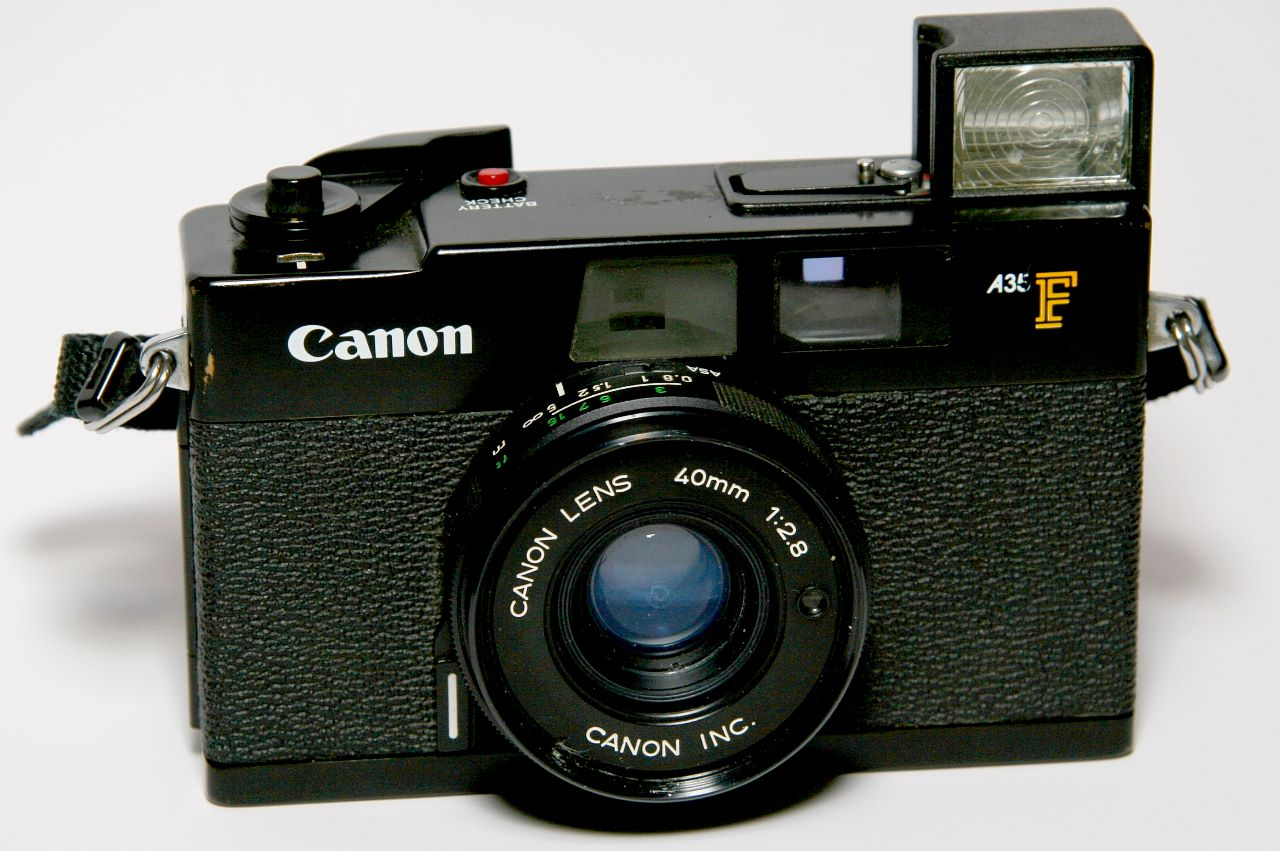

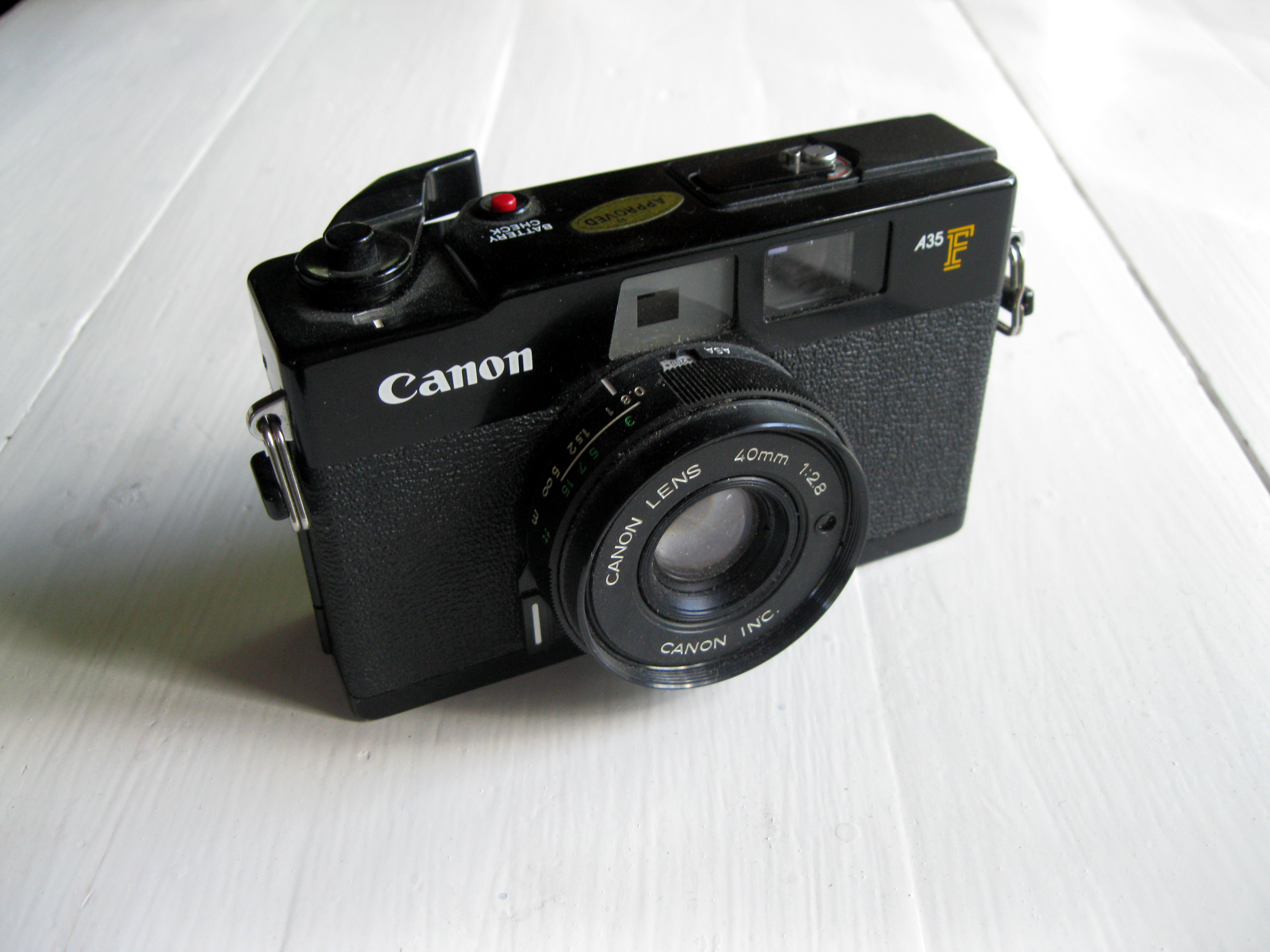

The Canon A35F is a 35mm rangefinder camera produced by Canon in 1978. It was one of the last manual-focus rangefinder cameras produced by Canon, based around the Canonet 28 body. It has program auto-exposure, controlled by a CdS meter between EV9 and 17 at ISO 100. It has a built-in automatic (but manually popped-up) flash with Guide No. 12 (in metres at ISO 100); there is no terminal to connect an external one. The flash system is called "CATS" (Canon Auto Tuning System) which meters the correct exposure according to the distance of the subject and charged voltage. The A35F - stands for "Automatic (exposure) Flash. and the newer model AF35 - stands for "AutoFocus".

It was superseded by the autofocus Sure Shot/AF35M/Autoboy in 1979.

== Specifications ==
- Lens: Canon 40mm f/2.8, 5 elements, 4 groups.
- Focusing: Coupled range finder.
- Shutter: Programmed AE shutter: 1/60 @ f2.8 - 1/320 @ f20
- Film Speeds: ISO 25, 50, 100, 200, 400.
- Viewfinder: Bright frame, parallax correction marks, double image rangefinder, aperture scale, over/under exposure warning marks and battery check zone.
- Power: 1 x PX-625 and 1 x AA (for flash).
- Dimensions: 122mm x 75mm x 61mm.
- Weight: 500g.
