= Canon AF35M =

35 mm compact camera

Canon AF35M Canon Sure Shot Canon Autoboy
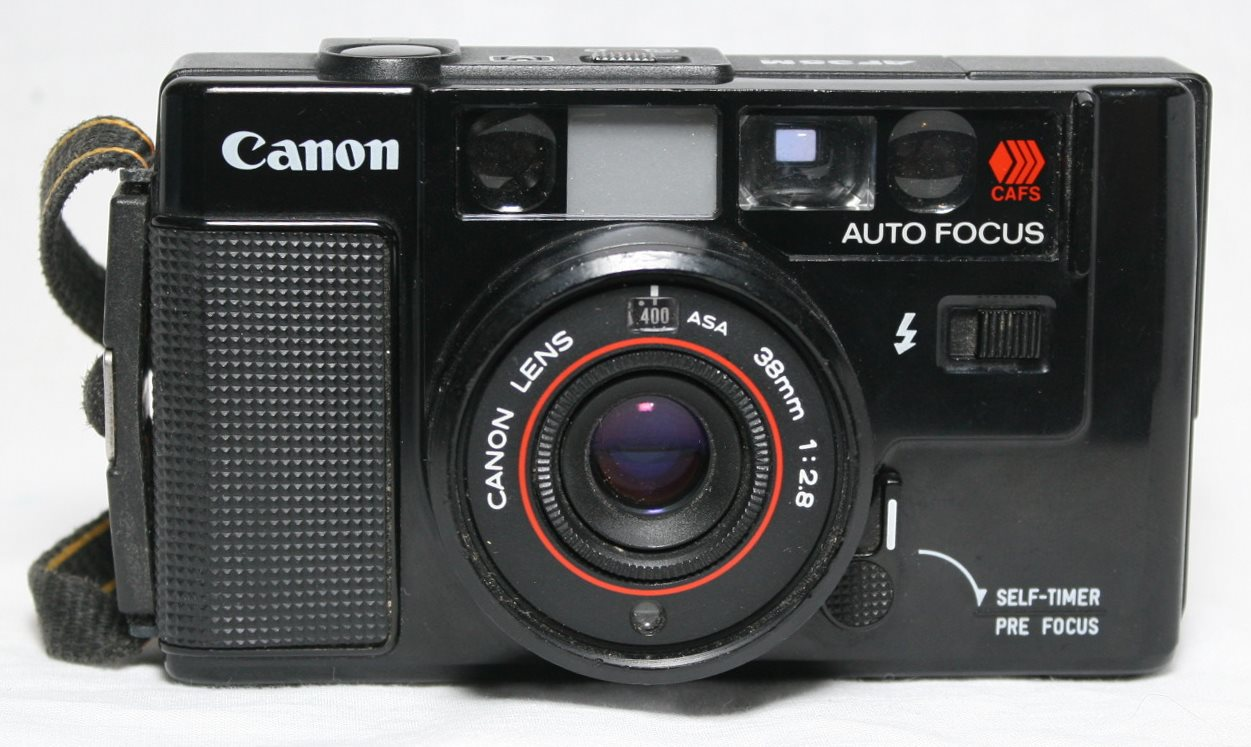

Overview
- Maker: Canon Camera
- Type: 35 mm point-and-shoot
- Released: November 1979

Lens
- Lens mount: Fixed
- Lens: 1:2.8 38 mm
- F-numbers: f/2.8 to f/16

Sensor/medium
- Film speed: ISO 25 to 400

Focusing
- Focus: Automatic; triangulation AF system with near-infrared beam

Exposure/metering
- Exposure: Automatic
- Exposure metering: EV6 to EV17 at ISO 100

Flash
- Flash: Built-in

Shutter
- Shutter speed range: 1/8 s to 1/500 s

General
- Battery: 2x 1.5V size-AA
- Dimensions: 132×77×54 mm (5.2×3.0×2.1 in)
- Weight: 405 g (14 oz)
- Made in: Japan; Taiwan

Chronology
- Replaced: Canon A35F
- Replaced by: Canon AF35ML; Canon AF35M II

The Canon AF35M (also known as the Sure Shot in North America and the Autoboy in Japan) is a 35 mm point-and-shoot compact camera by Canon Inc.. Introduced in November 1979, it was Canon's first compact camera with an autofocus feature. The camera later spawned a line of Canon compact cameras marketed as "Sure Shot" in North America, "Prima" in Europe, and "Autoboy" in Japan from the 1980s to 2005.

== History ==
The AF35M's official name was the "AF-Plus Motor-Drive Camera", but it became more famous by its nicknames "Autoboy" in Japan" and "Sure Shot" in North America. It took Canon 14 years to develop the camera's autofocus mechanism. The active autofocus system used a near-infrared emitting diode and a PIN photodiode to determine the subject position by triangulation in a manner similar to a coincident-image rangefinder. This meant that the system was independent of ambient light levels and achieved a high degree of accuracy; however, it could be fooled by glass (which is not transparent to infrared radiation). The autofocus area was marked on the reverse-Galilean optical viewfinder, which also had projected framelines, zone focusing marks for near, medium and far (lit to indicate the approximate area the autofocus had selected), parallax correction marks, and battery-check and camera-shake warning LEDs. Viewfinder magnification was 0.5× and coverage was 85% of the full 135 frame area.

The lens was of 38 mm focal length and with a maximum aperture of f/2.8. A ring around the lens optic itself was used to set the film speed (ISO 25 to 400), which was indicated on a small window on the front of the lens assembly; also there, but below the lens optic itself, was the cadmium sulfide (CdS) photoresistor for the light meter. The location of this, inside the filter ring of the lens, meant that the meter would function accurately even with 48 mm filters fitted to the lens.

Film transport was fully automatic in both directions, but the camera was not fitted with Canon's Quick Load feature; film still had to be manually threaded to the take-up spool.

An integral flash was fitted; this retracted into the top of the camera on the left (from the user's perspective) and was manually extended via releasing a catch on the camera's front. The unit had a guide number of 14 (at ISO 100 in meters) and featured auto-exposure with the camera's light meter as well as supporting fill flash. Also on the front was a self-timer control.

The camera received the Japanese Ministry of International Trade and Industry's Good Design Award in September 1980. It proved successful among similar cameras from the competition and sold well; production reached 110,000 per month by the second half of 1981.

The AF35M was partly supplanted the higher-specified AF35ML (Super Sure Shot in North America and Autoboy Super in Japan) in 1981 and wholly replaced by the AF35M II (New Sure Shot/New Sure Shot QD in North America and Autoboy 2/2QD in Japan) in 1983.

== Gallery ==
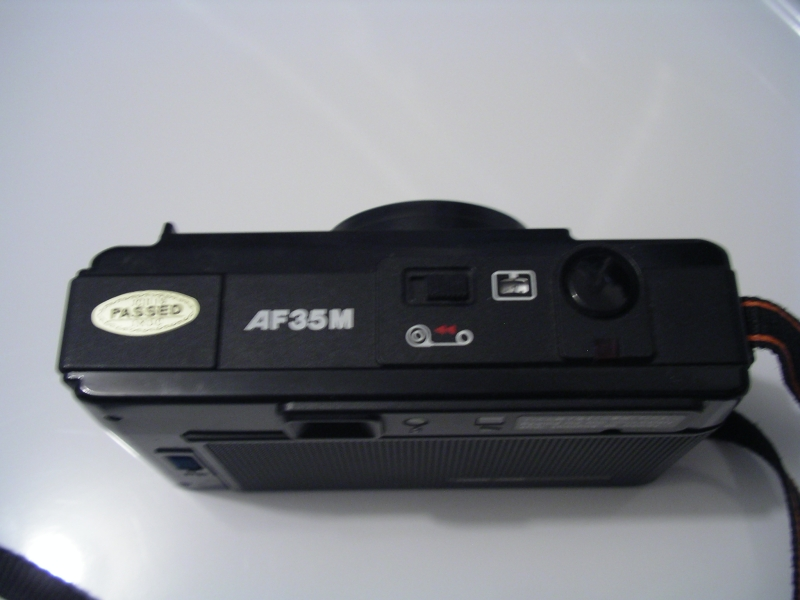
Top view

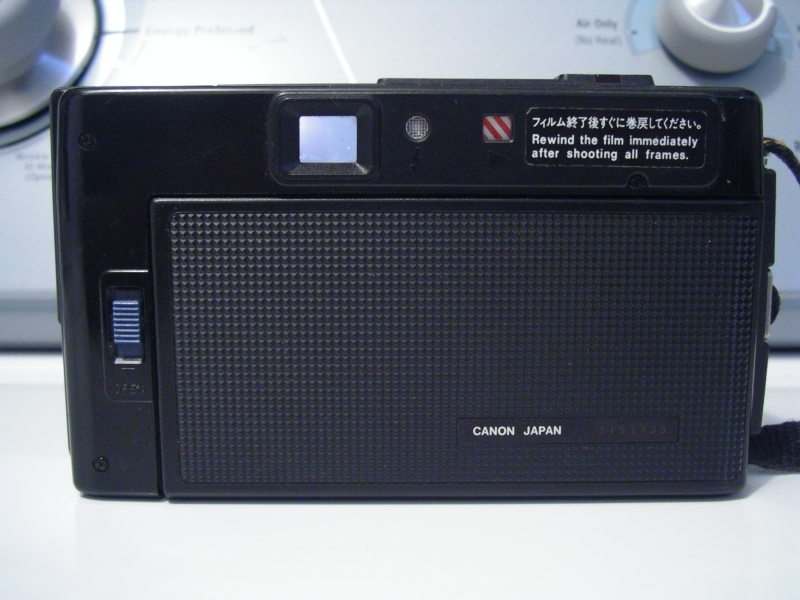
Rear view

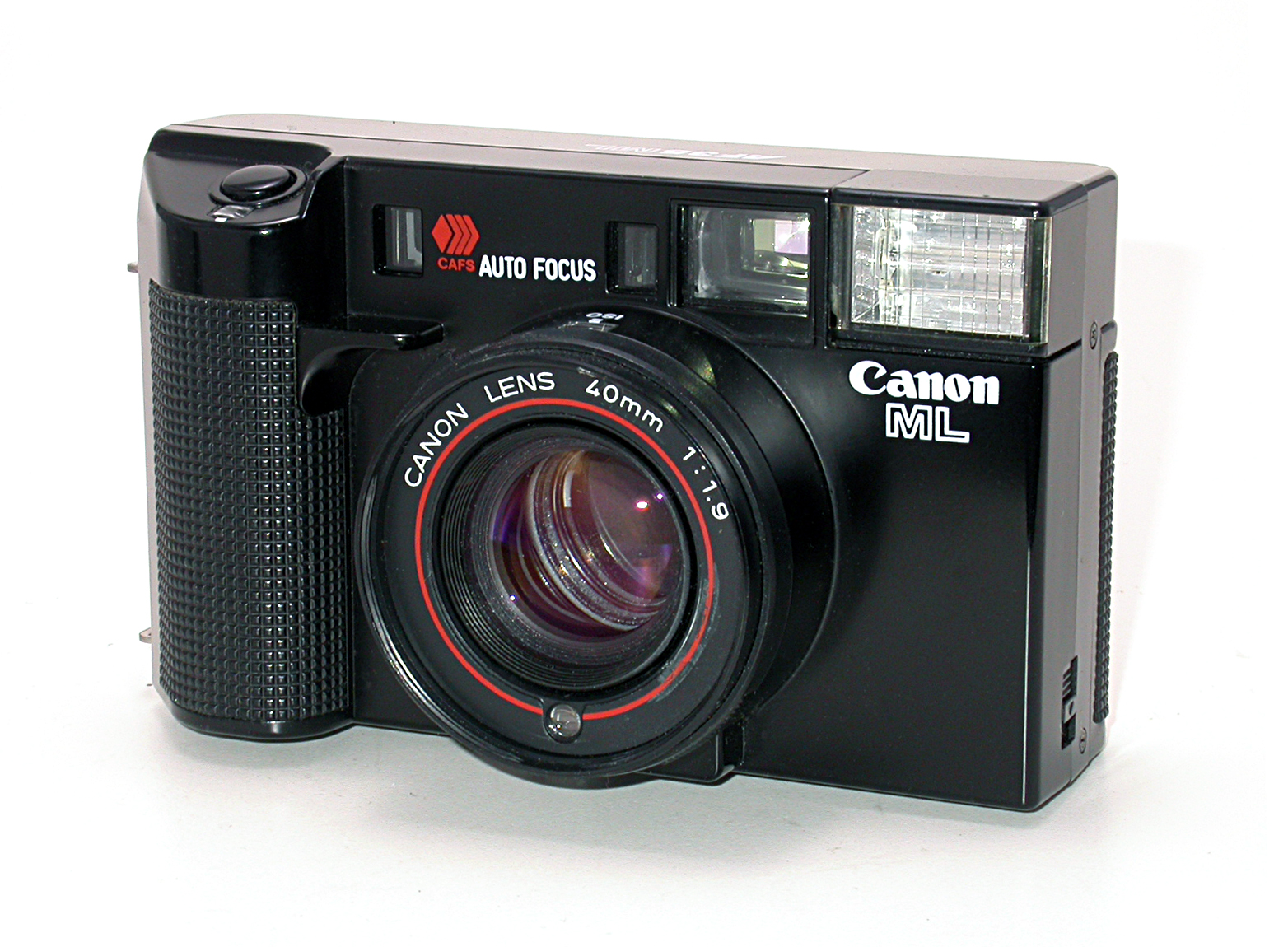
Canon AF35ML from 1981

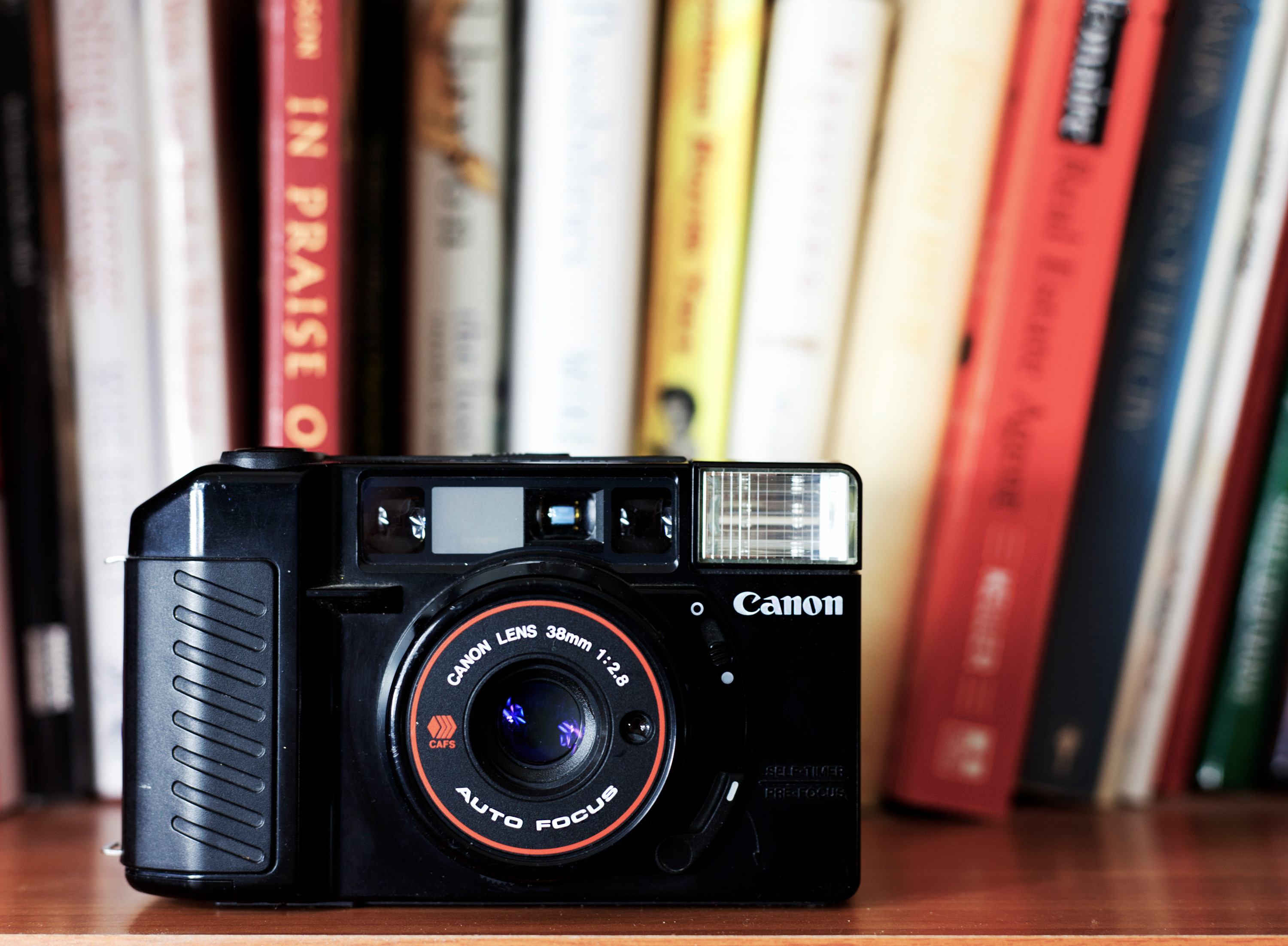
Canon AF35M II from 1983
