= Sony Alpha 900 =

Digital camera

Sony α 900
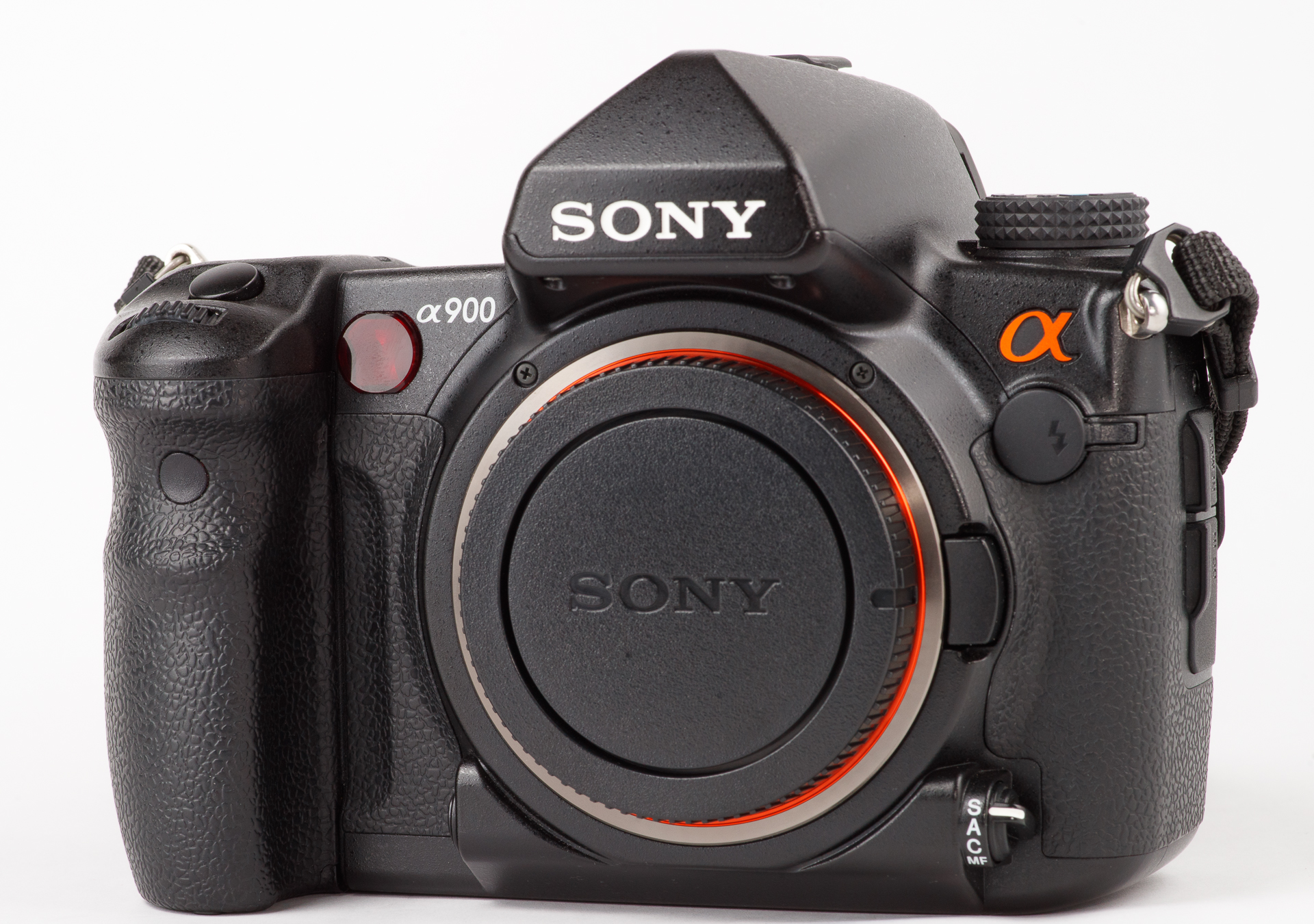

Overview
- Maker: Sony Group
- Type: Single-lens reflex

Lens
- Lens: Sony mount; compatible with Minolta A-type bayonet mount.

Sensor/medium
- Sensor: 35.9 mm × 24.0 mm Exmor CMOS sensor
- Maximum resolution: 24.6 megapixels
- Film speed: ISO 100–6400
- Storage media: Memory Stick: Memory Stick Duo, Memory Stick PRO Duo, Memory Stick PRO-HG Duo Compact Flash Type I, Type II (Microdrive), UDMA (Mode5) compliant

Focusing
- Focus modes: Wide AF area, Spot AF area (center), Focus area selection (any of 9)
- Focus areas: TTL CCD line sensors (9-points, center dual cross types + 10 assist sensors)

Exposure/metering
- Exposure modes: Mode: Auto, Program Auto (P, with program shift), Aperture priority (A), Shutter priority (S), Manual (M)
- Exposure metering: TTL metering Cell: 40-segment honeycomb-pattern SPC Range: 0 EV to 20 EV (+2 EV to +20 EV with Spot metering) (at ISO 100 equivalent with F1.4 lens)
- Metering modes: Multi segment, Spot, Centre weighted

Shutter
- Shutter: Electronically controlled, vertical-traverse, focal-plane type
- Shutter speed range: 1/8000 sec. – 30 sec., bulb
- Continuous shooting: 5fps

Viewfinder
- Viewfinder: Fixed eye-level system with optical glass type pentaprism, approximately 100%, 0.74x Magnification

General
- LCD screen: 3.0", 921,600 dots
- Battery: NP-FM500H Lithium-Ion rechargeable battery (1650 mAh)
- Optional battery packs: Vertical Grip VG-C90AM
- Weight: 850 g (30 oz)
- Made in: Japan

The α900 (DSLR-A900) is a full-frame digital SLR camera, produced by Sony. An early design study of the camera was shown at PMA on 8 March 2007, and a newer prototype announced at PMA 2008 on 31 January 2008. Sony officially introduced the final camera on 9 September 2008 prior to photokina 2008. In October 2011, Sony Japan announced the camera's end of production.

The specifications include: 24.6-megapixel CMOS sensor, 5 frame/s burst mode, dual BIONZ processors, 100% viewfinder, 9-point AF with 10 assist points, inbuilt image sensor shift stabilization and intelligent preview. It does not have video/movie recording.

== Intelligent preview mode ==
This mode, first introduced on the DSLR-A900, allows the photographer to take a sample image at the current settings. When this mode is enabled in the settings (default), then using the depth of field (DOF) preview button makes a preview image of the subject. The display shows the image and its image histogram, but it is not stored on the memory card. At that point, the photographer can accept current settings or simulate how the image (and histogram) would look with changes in aperture, shutter speed, dynamic range optimizer and white balance. If the photographer prefers those new settings he simply continues to work to accept them. Otherwise he can reject them by depressing the garbage can icon. He can also compare the sample to the simulation by depressing the DISP button.

== Predecessor to the DSLR-A850 ==
The DSLR-A900 requires a labour-intensive alignment procedure in the factory in order to provide a 100% scene view in the viewfinder. In eliminating this costly procedure by masking the view to a slightly smaller area (98%) while also downspecifying the frame rate to 3 frames per second, the DSLR-A850 offers a camera with most of the benefits of the DSLR-A900 at a significant saving to the photographer.

Level	Sensor	2004	2005	2006	2007	2008	2009	2010	2011		2012	2013	2014	2015	2016	2017	2018	2019	2020
Professional	Full frame						α900					α99				α99 II			
Professional	Full frame							α850											
High-end	APS-C		DG-7D			α700				α77				α77 II					
Midrange	APS-C									α65					α68				
Upper-entry	APS-C								α55		α57								
Upper-entry	APS-C				α100			α550 ^{F}	α580				α58						
Upper-entry	APS-C		DG-5D					α500	α560										
Upper-entry	APS-C							α450											
Entry-level	APS-C								α33	α35	α37								
Entry-level	APS-C					α350 ^{F}		α380	α390										
Entry-level	APS-C					α300		α330											
Entry-level	APS-C					α200		α230	α290										
Early models	Minolta 7000 with SB-70/SB-70S (1986) · Minolta 9000 with SB-90/SB-90S (1986) (Still video SLRs); Minolta MS-C1100 (1992) · Minolta RD-175 (1995)																		
Level	Sensor																		
Level	Sensor	2004	2005	2006	2007	2008	2009	2010	2011		2012	2013	2014	2015	2016	2017	2018	2019	2020
