= Sony Alpha 850 =

Sony α850
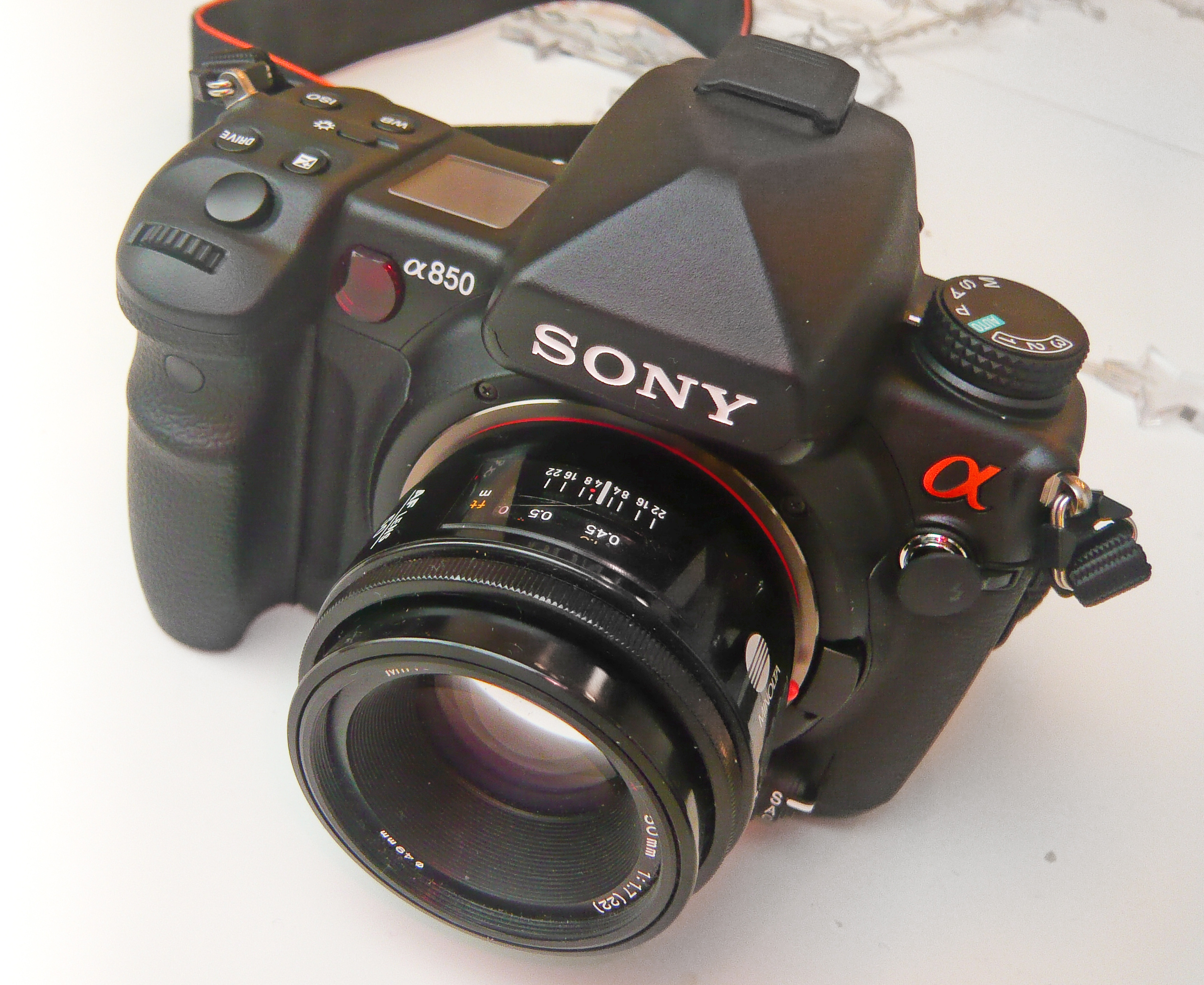

Overview
- Maker: Sony Group
- Type: Single-lens reflex

Lens
- Lens: Sony mount; compatible with Minolta A-type bayonet mount. Sony α lens and Konica Minolta α/Maxxum/Dynax lens (Note: Sony's DT series lenses are not recommended for use with 35mm full-frame sensors due to their differing image circle size, which may affect light metering accuracy in certain shooting situations.)

Sensor/medium
- Sensor: 35.8 mm × 23.9 mm Exmor CMOS sensor
- Maximum resolution: 24.6 megapixels
- Storage media: Memory Stick: Memory Stick Duo, Memory Stick PRO Duo, Memory Stick PRO-HG Duo Compact Flash Type I, Type II (Microdrive), UDMA (Mode 5) compliant

Focusing
- Focus: Manual, and; AF Modes : Single-shot AF, Automatic AF, Continuous AF, (AF/MF selectable)
- Focus modes: dual-cross 9 point AF w/10 assist points, center AF w/2.8 sensor
- Focus areas: Wide (Auto, up to 9 areas), Spot, Local (9 local areas selectable)

Exposure/metering
- Exposure modes: Mode: Auto, Program Auto (P, with program shift), Aperture priority (A), Shutter priority (S), Manual (M)
- Exposure metering: Type: TTL metering; Cell: 40-segment honeycomb-pattern SPC; Range: 0 EV to 20 EV (+2 EV to +20 EV with spot metering); (at ISO 100 equivalent with F1.4 lens): Mode: Multi segment, Spot, Centre weighted

Shutter
- Frame rate: 3
- Shutter: Electronically-controlled, vertical-traverse, focal-plane type
- Shutter speed range: 1/8000 sec. – 30 sec., bulb, 1/250 sec. (SteadyShot off), 1/200 sec. (SteadyShot on), maximum burst of 3 frames per second.

Viewfinder
- Viewfinder: Fixed eye-level system with optical glass type pentaprism, approximately 98%

General
- LCD screen: 3.0", 921k pixels, 100% coverage
- AV port: HDMI
- Data port: USB 2.0
- Body features: Magnesium Alloy body; weather & dust resistant uses rubber seals
- Weight: 850 g (30 oz) (bare body)
- Made in: Japan

The α850 (DSLR-A850) was Sony's second full-frame digital SLR, introduced on 27 August 2009. Similar to the DSLR-A900, the camera featured the same 24.6-megapixel full-frame CMOS sensor used in the a900. On 8 June 2011, Sony pre-announced the camera's end of production in July/August 2011.

The camera was almost exactly the same as the DSLR-A900, but the viewfinder coverage was dropped to 98% with 0.74× magnification and the burst rate was reduced to 3 frames per second.

== Notes ==
Level	Sensor	2004	2005	2006	2007	2008	2009	2010	2011		2012	2013	2014	2015	2016	2017	2018	2019	2020
Professional	Full frame						α900					α99				α99 II			
Professional	Full frame							α850											
High-end	APS-C		DG-7D			α700				α77				α77 II					
Midrange	APS-C									α65					α68				
Upper-entry	APS-C								α55		α57								
Upper-entry	APS-C				α100			α550 ^{F}	α580				α58						
Upper-entry	APS-C		DG-5D					α500	α560										
Upper-entry	APS-C							α450											
Entry-level	APS-C								α33	α35	α37								
Entry-level	APS-C					α350 ^{F}		α380	α390										
Entry-level	APS-C					α300		α330											
Entry-level	APS-C					α200		α230	α290										
Early models	Minolta 7000 with SB-70/SB-70S (1986) · Minolta 9000 with SB-90/SB-90S (1986) (Still video SLRs); Minolta MS-C1100 (1992) · Minolta RD-175 (1995)																		
Level	Sensor																		
Level	Sensor	2004	2005	2006	2007	2008	2009	2010	2011		2012	2013	2014	2015	2016	2017	2018	2019	2020
