= Mamiya 645 =

Series of film and digital cameras and lenses

Mamiya 645 First Generation
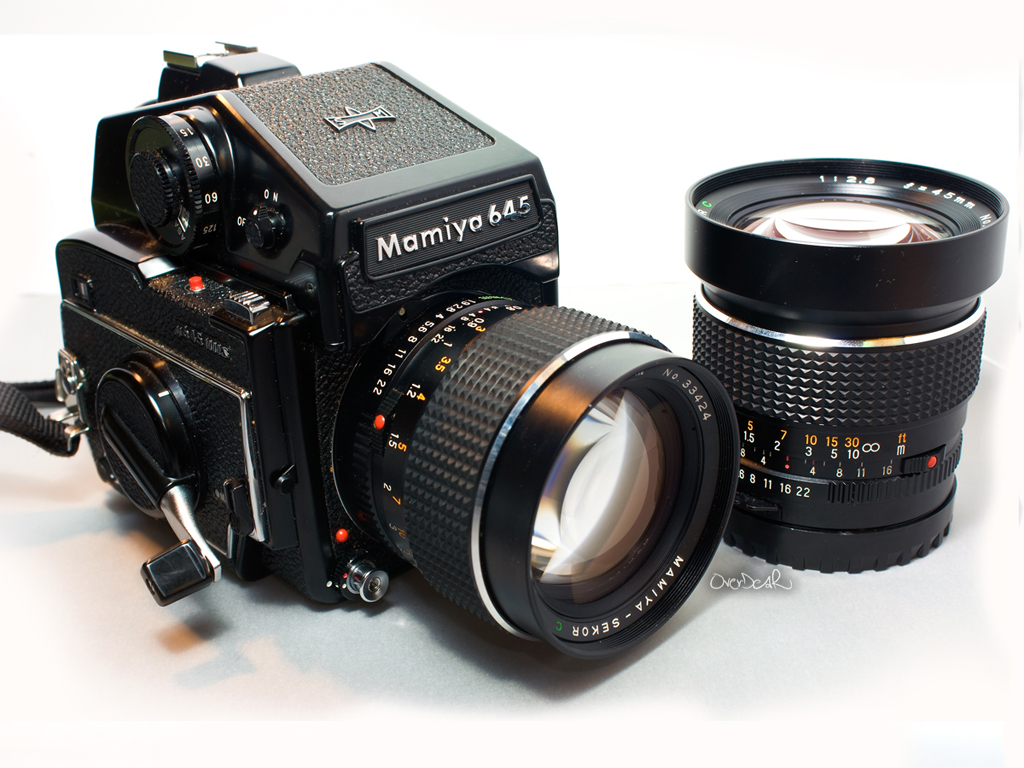
- Mamiya M645 1000S with CdS prism, with 80mm f/1.9 and 45mm f/2.8 lenses

Overview
- Maker: Mamiya
- Type: Single-lens reflex
- Released: 1975 - 1990

Lens
- Lens mount: Mamiya 645 bayonet
- Lens: Interchangeable lens

Sensor/medium
- Film format: 120 film
- Film size: 6x4.5cm (645)
- Film speed: 25 to 6400
- Film advance: Manual or Auto

Focusing
- Focus: Manual focus

Exposure/metering
- Exposure: Manual or Aperture Priority
- Exposure metering: Through interchangeable prisms
- Metering modes: Center-weighted

Viewfinder
- Viewfinder: Interchangeable

General
- Made in: Japan

The Mamiya 645 camera systems are a series of medium format film and digital cameras and lenses manufactured by Mamiya and its successors. They are called "645" because they use the nominal 6 cm x 4.5 cm film size from 120 roll film. They came in three major generations: first-generation manual-focus film cameras, second-generation manual-focus film cameras, and autofocus film/digital cameras.

Mamiya 645 Second Generation
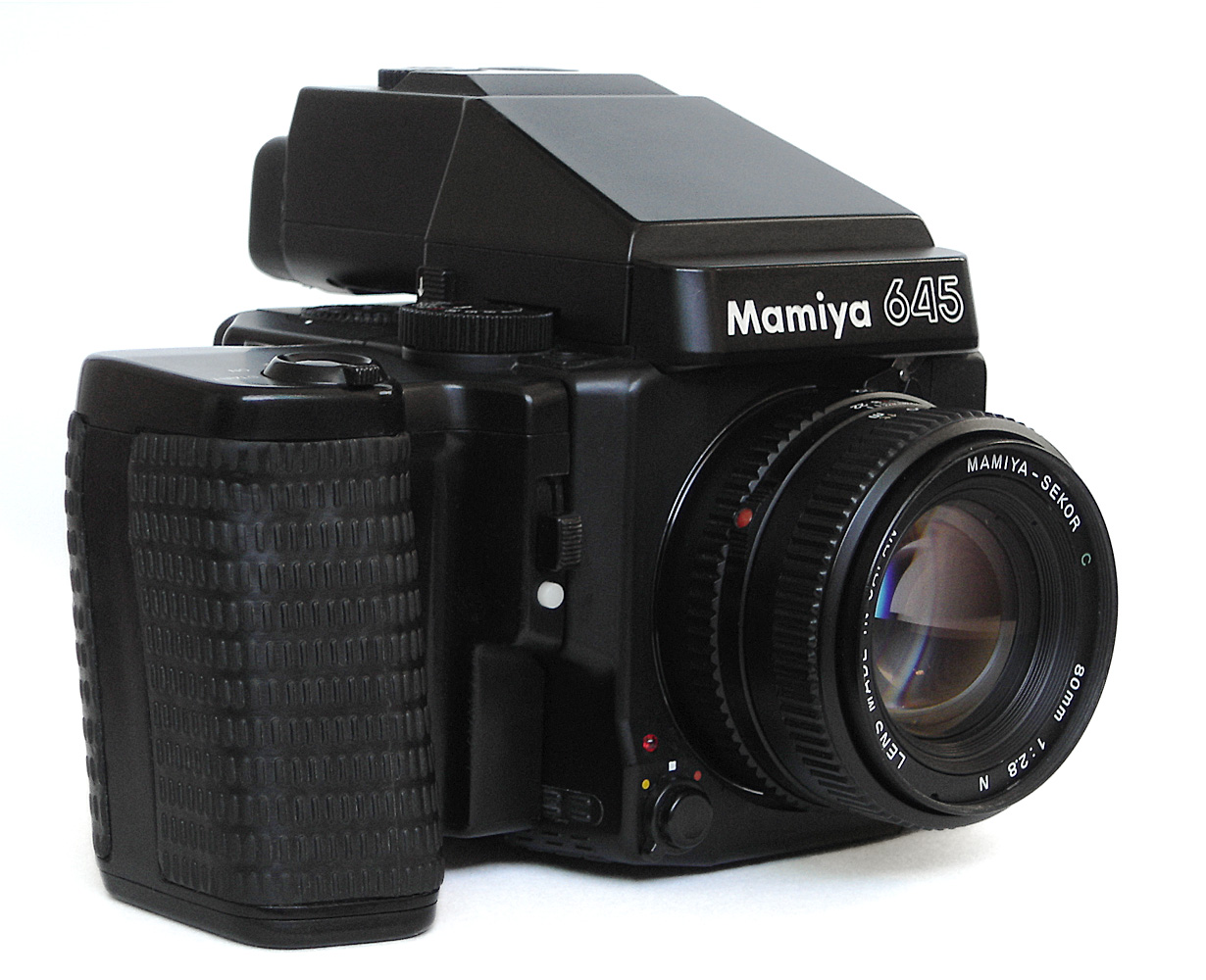
- Mamiya 645 Super with power winder grip, AE prism N, and 80mm f/2.8 N lens

Overview
- Maker: Mamiya
- Type: Single-lens reflex
- Released: 1985 - 2006

Lens
- Lens mount: Mamiya 645 bayonet
- Lens: Interchangeable lens

Sensor/medium
- Film format: 120 film
- Film size: 6x4.5cm (645)
- Film speed: 25 to 6400
- Film advance: Manual or Auto

Focusing
- Focus: Manual focus

Exposure/metering
- Exposure: Manual or Aperture Priority
- Exposure metering: Through interchangeable prisms
- Metering modes: Center-weighted, spot-metering, or computer-controlled

Viewfinder
- Viewfinder: Interchangeable

General
- Made in: Japan

== Mamiya 645 Manual Focus System ==
=== Mamiya 645 manual focus cameras ===
All seven of the manual-focus Mamiya 645 cameras can use the same lenses and film inserts (film spools). The two generations use different viewfinders, grips, and other accessories that are not always cross-compatible.

==== First Generation ====
- The M645 was manufactured from 1975 to 1987. This was the first model to offer a 6x4.5 cm frame, allowing 15 shots on a standard 120 roll film. The M645 was a true system camera, with interchangeable viewfinders and lenses. It used an electronically controlled cloth focal plane shutter offering speeds of 8 seconds to 1/500 second in one-stop increments. The camera featured a mirror lockup, as well as selectable multi-exposure. Film was carried in cartridges that could be pre-loaded, but no capability existed to allow changing of film magazines mid-roll. A waist-level non-metered finder was available, as well as a non-metered pentaprism and three varieties of through-the-lens (TTL) metered prisms (CdS, PD and AE). The metered prisms read the aperture dial through a mechanical coupling on the lens. The standard lens was the 80mm f/2.8 C or the 70mm f/2.8 C E or the 80mm f/1.9 C.
- The M645 1000S was manufactured from 1976 to 1990. This camera added a 1/1000 second shutter speed to the M645, as well as a self-timer and a depth-of-field preview lever. The standard lens was the 80mm f/2.8 C or the 80mm f/1.9 C.
- The M645J was manufactured from 1979 to 1982. This was a stripped-down version of the M645, with the mirror lockup knob and second shutter button removed. The standard lens was the 80mm f/2.8 C or the 80mm f/1.9 C.

==== Second Generation ====
- The Mamiya 645 Super was manufactured from 1985 to 1993. This was a new camera with a molded plastic shell on a diecast metal frame. Its features are the same as the M645 1000s, but it added removable film backs, whereby a dark-slide could be inserted and the back removed mid-roll. The standard lens was the 80mm f/2.8 N, or the 80mm f/1.9 C (early) or the 80mm f/1.9 N (late).
- The Mamiya 645 Pro was manufactured from 1993 to 1998. It added a self-timer and a smoother styling. The standard lens was the 80mm f/2.8 N or the 80mm f/1.9 N.
- The Mamiya 645 Pro-TL was manufactured from 1997 to 2006 and is functionally similar to the 645 Pro but adds through-the-lens flash metering. The standard lens was the 80mm f/2.8 N or the 80mm f/1.9 N.
- The Mamiya 645E was manufactured from 2000 to 2006. This was an entry-level version of the M645 Pro without switchable backs or viewfinders. It did have a light meter built in to the viewfinder, however. The standard lens was the 80mm f/2.8 N or the 80mm f/1.9 N.

Mamiya 645 Manual Focus Camera Comparison
Model	Body / Frame Construction	Years	Slowest Shutter	Fastest Shutter	Flash Sync	Weight (body)	Switchable Backs	Switchable Finders	Mirror Lockup	Self Timer	Multi Exposure	DoF Preview on Body	Shutter buttons
M645	Metal / Metal	1975-87	8s	1/500s	1/60s	920g	No	Yes	Yes	No	Yes	No	Two
M645 1000S	Metal / Metal	1976-90	8s	1/1000s	1/60s	965g	No	Yes	Yes	Yes	Yes	Yes	Two
M645J	Metal / Metal	1979-82	1s	1/500s	1/60s	910g	No	Yes	No	No	Yes	No	One
645 Super	Plastic / Metal	1985-93	4s	1/1000s	1/60s	895g	Yes	Yes	Yes	No	Yes	No	One
645 Pro	Plastic / Metal	1993-98	4s	1/1000s	1/60s	980g	Yes	Yes	Yes	Yes	Yes	No	One
645 Pro-TL	Plastic / Metal	1997-06	4s	1/1000s	1/60s	970g	Yes	Yes	Yes	Yes	Yes	No	One
645E	Plastic / Metal	2000-06	4s	1/1000s	1/60s	1340g	No	No	Yes	No	Yes	No	One

=== Mamiya 645 Manual-Focus Lenses ===
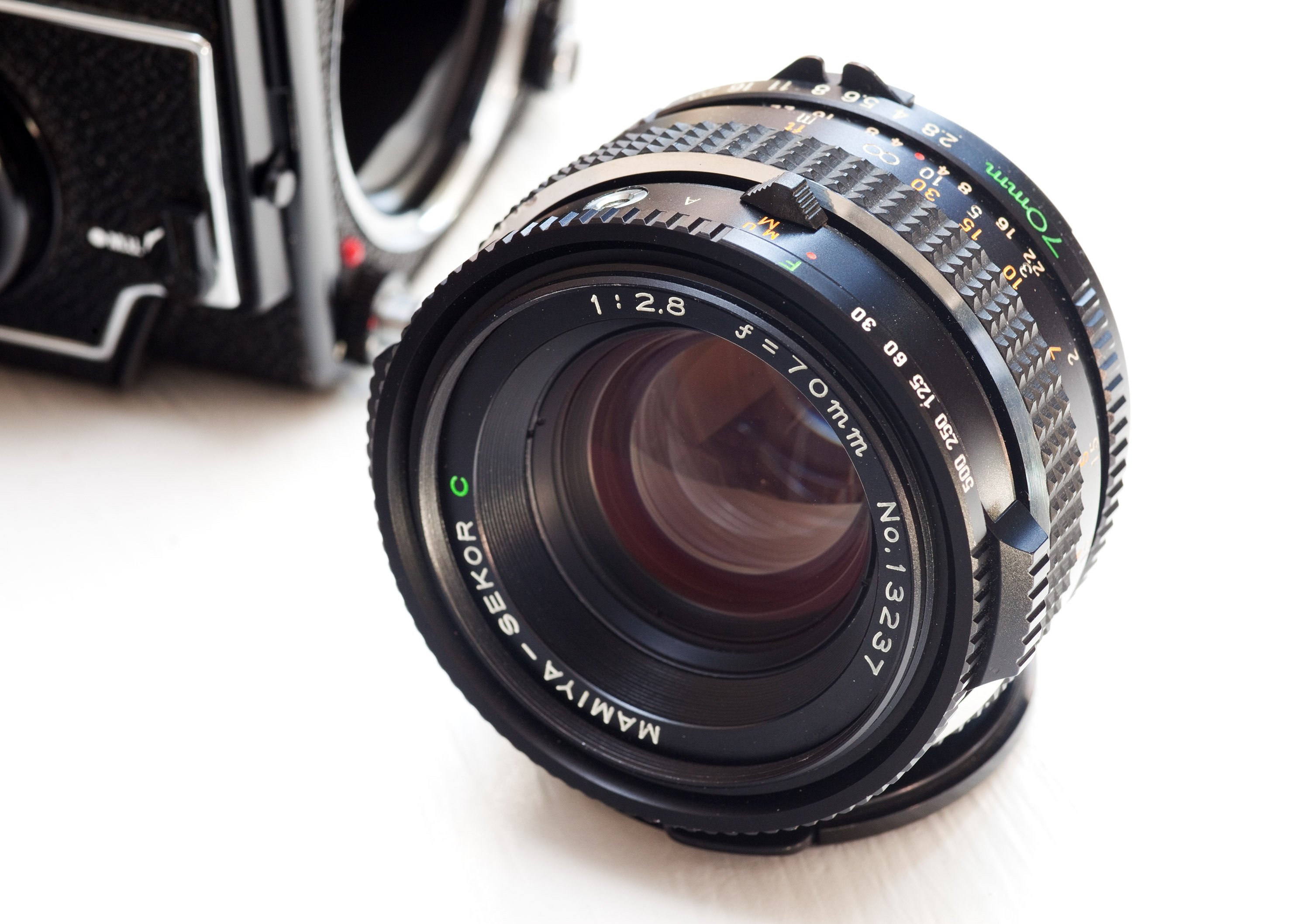
A Mamiya 70mm f/2.8. This lens has a built-in leaf shutter, which is cocked by the grips at the 3 o'clock and 9 o'clock positions

The Mamiya 645 Manual-Focus lenses will work on all manual-focus bodies. They will also work on autofocus bodies such as the Mamiya 645AF, Mamiya 645DF and Phase One 645DF, but manual-focus lenses will require light metering after the lens has been stopped down, unlike native autofocus lenses. Third-party adapters exist to use these manual-focus lenses on Nikon F mount, Canon EF mount, and other cameras. These lenses will not work on the Phase One XF unless modified. All Mamiya 645 lenses are multi-coated. Nearly all have curved aperture blades, rendering smooth backgrounds at wider aperture settings.

The internal shutter in the first-generation 645 bodies only supported flash synchronization at 1/60th of a second. This made outdoors fill flash difficult, and so some lenses were equipped with a built-in leaf shutter which supported flash synchronization at all speeds up to 1/500th of a second. Leaf shutter lenses had a separate PC socket. In order to take advantage of the faster speeds the internal shutter had to be fired at 1/30th of a second or slower.

==== Lens abbreviations ====
- A or APO — the lens has an apochromatic (or near-apochromatic) design
- C — the lens is stamped “Sekor C” on the lens barrel. All manual-focus lenses for Mamiya 645 are Sekor C lenses, which Mamiya used to designate multi-coated lenses.
- E — only for the 70mm f/2.8 E lens sold as a kit with the original M645, apparently late in the M645's production run to differentiate it from the leaf-shutter version.
- Macro — the lens is optimized for close focusing and close-up (macro) photography
- N — the lens has a "new" cosmetic design. "N" lenses were launched with the second generation manual-focus cameras. Many "N" lenses are the same as their prior "C" or "S" lens version, but have changes to the lens coatings and a plastic aperture ring instead of metal. Some "C" lenses received a cosmetic update (removal of the chrome on the focus ring) but were not otherwise changed and did not receive a "N" marking, such as the 50mm f/4.5 and 500mm f/5.6. "N" lenses may also be called "CN" lenses.
- N/L — the lens has the "new" cosmetic design and an integrated Leaf Shutter. When used with the optional power drive WG-401 on second generation bodies, the leaf shutters are automatically cocked. On first generation bodies, or without the power drive, the leaf shutters must be cocked manually.
- S — the lens is a revised version of a "C" lens. The only lenses with "S" versions are the 45mm f/2.8 and 55mm f/2.8 (both with different optical formulas and dimensions than their predecessors), but other accessories have "S" versions, including the Waist-level Finder W, the Prism Viewfinder PD, and the #3 extension tube. Early "S" lenses may have gold "S" stickers on them, while later "S" lenses may have the "S" engraved. "S" lenses may also be called "CS" lenses.
- SF — the lens has a separate control ring to create a Soft Focus effect.
- ULD — the lens has “ultra low dispersion” glass in its design
- Zoom — the lens has a variable focal length

==== Lens table ====
Mamiya 645 Manual Focus Lenses
Focal length	Aperture	Versions*	Special Features	Aperture Range	Aperture Blades	Elements / Groups	Minimum focusing	Filter Size	Hood type	Length × Diameter	Weight	Equivalent Focal Length in 35mm format	Equivalent Aperture in 35mm format	Peak Resolution Performance (lines/mm)**
24 mm	f/4	C	ULD Fisheye	4-22	5	10 / 8	0.3 m	Drop-in	Fixed	82 × 100 mm	785 g	15 mm	f/2.5	N.A.
35 mm	f/3.5	C, N		3.5-22	6	9 / 7	0.45 m	77 mm	None	62 × 80 mm	445 g	22 mm	f/2.2	74 @ f/5.6 (AF version)
45 mm	f/2.8	C		2.8-22	6	9 / 7	0.45m / 0.50m	77mm	Slip-on	78 × 80 mm	540 g	28 mm	f/1.8	N.A.
45 mm	f/2.8	S, N		2.8-22	6	9 / 7	0.45 m	67 mm	Slip-on	71 × 75 mm (N version)	475 g	28 mm	f/1.8	78 @ f/5.6 (AF version)
50 mm	f/4	C	Shift	4-32	6	10 / 8	0.45 m	77 mm	None	106 × 80 mm	735 g	31 mm	f/2.5	N.A.
55 mm	f/2.8	C		2.8-22	6	9 / 6	0.55 m	58 mm	Screw-in	71 × 70 mm	395 g	34 mm	f/1.8	83 @ f/8 (C version)
55 mm	f/2.8	S, N		2.8-22	6	8 / 6	0.45 m	58 mm	Screw-in	59 × 70 mm (N version)	335 g (S) 305 g (N)	34 mm	f/1.8	73 @ f/8 (N version)
55 mm	f/2.8	A N/L	Leaf Shutter	2.8-22	5	8 / 6	0.45 m	67 mm	Screw-in	62 × 80 mm	520 g	34 mm	f/1.8	N.A.
70 mm	f/2.8	E		2.8-22	6	6 / 4	0.8 m	58 mm	Screw-in	50 × 70 mm	285 g	43 mm	f/1.8	N.A.
70 mm	f/2.8	C	Leaf Shutter	2.8-22	5	6 / 4	0.8 m	58 mm	Screw-in	50 × 76 mm	395 g	43 mm	f/1.8	N.A.
80 mm	f/1.9	C, N		1.9-22	6	7 / 6	0.7 m	67 mm	Screw-in	59 × 76 mm	420 g	50 mm	f/1.2	N.A.
80 mm	f/2.8	C, N		2.8-22	6	6 / 5	0.7 m	58 mm	Screw-in	47 × 70 mm (C) 44 × 70 mm (N)	250 g (C) 220 g (N)	50 mm	f/1.8	58 @ f/11 (C) 73 @ f/5.6 (N) 78 @ f/4 (AF)
80 mm	f/2.8	A N/L	Leaf Shutter	2.8-22	5	6 / 5	0.8 m	67 mm	Screw-in	62 × 80 mm	460 g	50 mm	f/1.8	N.A.
80 mm	f/4	C, N	Macro 1:2	4-22	5	6 / 4	0.37 m	67 mm	None	75 × 79 mm	585 g	50 mm	f/2.5	N.A.
110 mm	f/2.8	C, N		2.8-22	6	5 / 5	1.2 m	58 mm	Screw-in	60 × 70 mm	390 g	68 mm	f/1.8	N.A.
120 mm	f/4	A	APO Macro 1:1	4-32	9	9 / 8	0.4 m	67 mm	None	111 × 77 mm	745 g	74 mm	f/2.5	71 @ f/8 (MF "A" version)
145 mm	f/4	C	Soft Focus	4-32	8	7 / 5	1.5 m	77 mm	Screw-in	116 × 82 mm	900 g	90 mm	f/2.5	N.A.
150 mm	f/2.8	A	APO	2.8-22	8	6 / 4	1.5 m	67 mm	Built-in	112 × 75 mm	740 g	93 mm	f/1.8	N.A.
150 mm	f/3.5	C, N		3.5-32	6	5 / 5	1.5 m	58 mm	Built-in	80 × 70 mm (N version)	415 g (C) 420 g (N)	93 mm	f/2.2	N.A.
150 mm	f/3.8	A N/L	Leaf Shutter	3.8-22	5	5 / 5	1.5 m	67 mm	Screw-in	82 × 79 mm	620 g	93 mm	f/2.4	N.A.
150 mm	f/4	C		4-32	6	5 / 4	1.5 m	58 mm	Built-in	91 × 70 mm	440 g	93 mm	f/2.5	52 @ f/4 (C version)
200 mm	f/2.8	A	APO	2.8-22	8	7 / 5	2.4 m	77 mm	Built-in	144 × 91 mm	1100 g	124 mm	f/1.8	64 @ f/8 (MF "A" version)
210 mm	f/4	C, N		4-32	9	5 / 4	2.5 m	58 mm	Built-in	137 × 70 mm	715 g (C) 775 g (N)	130 mm	f/2.5	77 @ f/4 (AF version)
300 mm	f/2.8	A	APO	2.8-22	8	9 / 8	3.5 m	43.5 mm rear	Built-in	237 × 140 mm	2660 g	186 mm	f/1.8	72 @ f/5.6 (MF "A" version)
300 mm	f/5.6	C, N	ULD (N version)	5.6-32	9	6 / 5	4 m	58 mm	Built-in	164 × 70 mm	710 g	186 mm	f/3.5	N.A.
500 mm	f/4.5	A	APO	4.5-32	N.A.	11 / 9	5 m	43.5 mm rear	Built-in	378 × 162 mm	5410 g	310 mm	f/2.8	N.A.
500 mm	f/5.6	C		5.6-45	9	6 / 5	9 m	105 mm	Built-in	358 × 114 mm	2280 g	310 mm	f/3.5	N.A.
500 mm	f/8	C	Reflex / Mirror	8 (fixed)	Fixed	7 / 5	4 m	Drop-in	Built-in	135 × 101 mm	880 g	310 mm	f/5.0	N.A.
55 – 110 mm	f/4.5	N	Zoom	4.5-32	8	11 / 10	1.5 m	67 mm	Screw-in	104 × 77 mm	800 g	34–68 mm	f/2.8	AF version: 61 @ 55mm/f11; 56 @ 75mm/f11; 52 @ 110mm/f8
75 – 150 mm	f/4.5	C	Zoom	4.5-32	8	11 / 10	1.8 m	77 mm	Slip-on	114 × 84 mm	975 g	47–93 mm	f/2.8	N.A.
105 – 210 mm	f/4.5	C	Zoom	4.5-32	6	15 / 11	2.5 m	77 mm	Screw-in	N/A × 80 mm	1220 g	65–130 mm	f/2.8	N.A.
105 – 210 mm	f/4.5	C	ULD zoom	4.5-32	9	13 / 11	1.8 m	58 mm	Built-in	158 × 75 mm	875 g	65–130 mm	f/2.8	AF version: 72 @ 105mm/f8; 60 @ 140mm/f8; 62 @ 210mm/f8

* Lens with multiple versions are combined to save space. In the "Versions" column, the versions are separated by commas. For example, the 210mm had two versions, the original "C" and the updated "N".

** Note that different tests have different testing procedures, and that this information is not necessarily a good indication of overall lens performance. Please see the references for the full reviews.

=== Mamiya 645 Manual Focus Accessories ===
==== Viewfinders — First Generation ====
Viewfinders — First Generation
Finder	Image reversed left-right	Magnification	Light meter type	Metering range*	Meter min shutter speed	Meter max shutter speed	ISO Range	Meter Display	Shutter Speed Dial Used	Aperture Priority Mode	Meter Exposure Range in Stops	Battery use	Hotshoe	Weight	Appearance notes
Waist level finder W	Yes	1.3x (with fold-up magnifier)	None	N/A	N/A	N/A	N/A	N/A	Camera	No	None	None	No	165g	Simple fold-up waist-level finder. Lacks fold-up sports finder (wire frame finder).**
Waist level finder W S	Yes	1.3x (with fold-up magnifier)	None	N/A	N/A	N/A	N/A	N/A	Camera	No	None	None	No	185g	Waist-level finder with built-in, fold-up sports finder (wire frame finder).
Prism viewfinder P	No	0.74x	None	N/A	N/A	N/A	N/A	N/A	Camera	No	None	None	Yes	380g	Sleek sides, no knobs besides small silver release knob on back.**
Prism viewfinder CdS	No	0.74x	Cadmium Sulfide	EV 2.85 to EV 17	1 sec.	1/1000	25-6400	Match Needle	Camera and Finder must both be set to the same speed	No	+/- 2 stops	1.5V SR44 or LR44	Yes	520g	Large shutter speed knob with inset ISO knob. Round on-off switch.**
Prism viewfinder PD	No	0.74x	Silicon Photo Diode	EV -1.15 to EV 18	8 sec.	1/500	25-6400	Seven LED	Finder (camera dial must be set at bullseye mark)	No	+/- 3 stops	Camera	Yes	495g	Large shutter speed knob (up to 1/500) with smaller, separate ISO knob and white "on" button (15 sec. timeout).**
Prism viewfinder PD S	No	0.74x	Silicon Photo Diode	EV -1.15 to EV 19	8 sec.	1/1000	25-6400	Seven LED	Finder (camera dial must be set at bullseye mark)	No	+/- 3 stops	Camera	Yes	500g	Large shutter speed knob (up to 1/1000) with smaller, separate ISO knob and white "on" button (15 sec. timeout)
Prism viewfinder AE	No	0.74x	Cadmium Sulfide	EV 2.85 to EV 17	2 sec.	1/1000	25-6400	Match Needle	Camera (bullseye mark setting activates Aperture Priority mode)	Yes	+/- 2 stops	Camera	Yes	535g	Small ISO knob only, and either a square sliding on-off switch (early) or a white "on" button surrounded by a circular on-off switch (late).

* when used with 80mm f/1.9 lens and 100 ISO film

** early version has silver "Mamiya" logo on the front, later version has silver "Mamiya 645" logo on front.

==== Viewfinder Accessories — First Generation ====
- Focusing screen No. 1 — microprism (standard screen with a microprism circle in the center)
- Focusing screen No. 2 — matte (for close-up work, just a ground glass, no focusing aid)
- Focusing screen No. 3 — checker/grid (like the matte screen, but with grid lines)
- Focusing screen No. 4 — rangefinder spot (a classic horizontal split-image rangefinder focusing screen)
- Focusing screen No. 5 — rangefinder spot with microprism (a 45-degree-angle split image rangefinder surrounded by a microprism area) - Standard on most models
- Magnifier (finder extension) for P, PD, PD S, CdS viewfinders
- Right-angle finder for P, PD, CdS viewfinders
- Right-angle finder 2 for P, PD, PD S, CdS viewfinders
- Diopter corrections (magnifiers) for P, PD, PD S, CdS viewfinders (-3 to +3)
- Diopter corrections (magnifiers) for W viewfinder (-3 to +2)

==== Film inserts — First Generation ====
- 120 film insert (can be used with both generations)
- 220 film insert (can be used with both generations)

==== Grips and Auto-winders — First Generation ====
- Pistol rubber handgrip with no shutter trigger
- Pistol plastic handgrip with shutter trigger
- Power drive grip (right hand) with shutter trigger — provides automatic film advance
- Standard L-grip (left hand) with no shutter trigger
- Deluxe L-grip (left hand) with shutter trigger and accessory shoe
- Flash gun adapter (similar shape to L-grip)
- Film advance knob or crank

==== Other accessories — First Generation ====
- Extension tube #1 - 11.8mm
- Extension tube #2 - 23.6mm
- Extension tube #3, Extension tube #3S - 35.4mm
- Auto macro spacer 2x - when used with 80mm f/4 Macro lens, increases magnification from 1:2 to 1:1
- Auto bellows
- Balloon bellows
- Slide copier attachment and slide carriers
- Focus handle (attaches to lens)
- Reversing ring RS58 for bellows (fits 58 mm filter-thread)
- Reversing ring RS67 for bellows (fits 67 mm filter thread)
- Tripod quick-shoe system
- Lens filters and hoods
- Bellows-style lens hood
- Hand and neck straps
- Aluminum traveling case branded with Mamiya logo, and smaller leather cases
- Adapter ZE (for Mamiya 35mm SLRs)

==== Viewfinders — Second Generation ====
Viewfinders — Second Generation
Finder	Image reversed left-right	Magnification	Light meter type	Metering range*	Meter min shutter speed	Meter max shutter speed	ISO Range	Meter Display	Shutter Speed Dial Used	Aperture Priority Mode	Meter Exposure Range in Stops	Battery use	Hotshoe	Appearance notes
Waist level finder W N	Yes	1.3x (with fold-up magnifier)	None	N/A	N/A	N/A	N/A	N/A	Camera	No	N/A	None	No	No large Mamiya logo, otherwise similar to Waist level finder W S from first generation
Prism viewfinder N	No	0.79x	None	N/A	N/A	N/A	N/A	N/A	Camera	No	N/A	None	No	Blocky shape from 645 Super, plain prism finder with no prominent knobs
Prism viewfinder FP401	No	0.79x	None	N/A	N/A	N/A	N/A	N/A	Camera	No	N/A	None	No	Smooth shape from 645 Pro and Pro TL, plain prism finder with no prominent knobs
AE Prism viewfinder N	No	0.79x	Silicon Photo Diode	EV -1.15 to EV 19	8 sec.	1/1000	25-6400 (set on film back)	LED shutter speed	Camera	Yes	+/- 3 stops	Camera	No	Blocky shape from 645 Super, two dials on top (metering mode and exposure compensation)
AE Prism viewfinder FE401	No	0.79x	Silicon Photo Diode	EV -1.15 to EV 19	8 sec.	1/1000	25-6400 (set on film back)	LED shutter speed	Camera	Yes	+/- 3 stops	Camera	No	Smooth shape from 645 Pro and Pro TL, two dials on top (metering mode and exposure compensation)
AE Prism viewfinder FK402	No	0.79x	Silicon Photo Diode	EV -1.15 to EV 19	8 sec.	1/1000	25-6400 (set on film back)	Four LED under / over	Camera	Yes	+/- 2 stops	Camera	No	No knobs (and no way to change metering mode or exposure compensation). Has short prism section with long tube coming off the back and dioptric correction dial (+/- 5 diopters) that rotates around the tube.

* when used with 80mm f/1.9 lens and 100 ISO film

==== Viewfinder Accessories — Second Generation ====
- Focusing screen N type A — matte
- Focusing screen N type A4 — checker/grid
- Focusing screen N type B — rangefinder spot
- Focusing screen N type C — microprism spot
- Focusing screen N type E — rangefinder spot with microprism
- Magnifier N for prism N, AE N viewfinders
- Angle finder N for prism N, AE N viewfinders
- Diopter corrections for prism N, AE N viewfinders
- Magnifying lenses for W N viewfinder

==== Camera backs / inserts — Second Generation ====
- 120 film insert (can be used with both generations)
- 220 film insert (can be used with both generations)
- 120 roll film back HA401 (second generation only)
- 220 roll film back HB401 (second generation only)
- 135 roll film back HC401 and special type E focusing screen (second generation only)
- Polaroid pack film holder HP401

==== Grips and Auto-winders — Second Generation ====
- Advance crank AC401
- Power winder grip WG401 (Super)
- Power winder grip WG402 (Pro and Pro TL)
- Left-hand grip GL401
- Flash bracket AD401

==== Other accessories — Second Generation ====
- 2x Teleconverter N
- Auto bellows N (includes double cable release)
- Various straps and cases (N models)
- All of the "Other accessories" listed above for First-generation systems can also be used

== Mamiya 645 Autofocus System ==
Mamiya 645 Autofocus
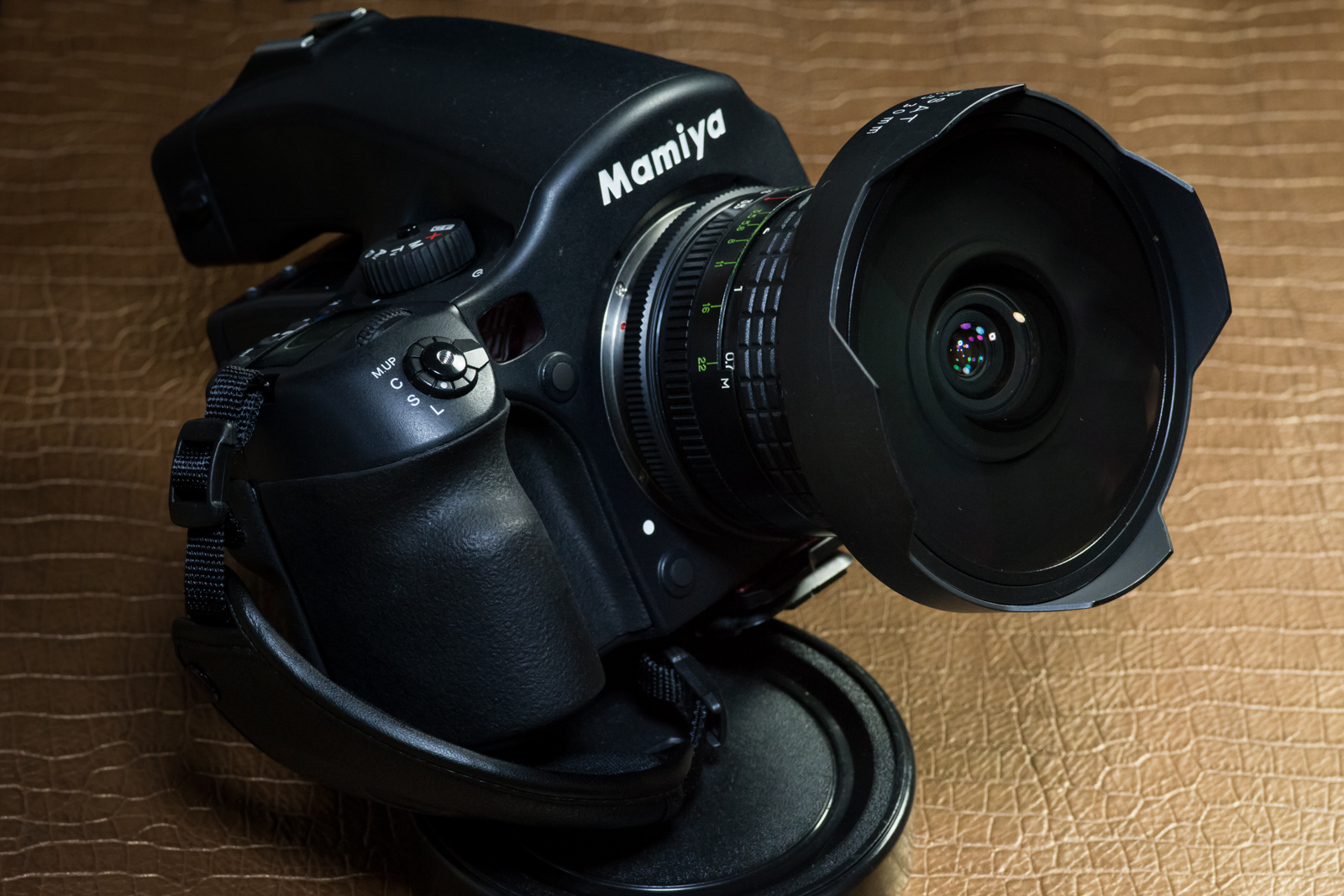
- Mamiya 645AFD with Arsat 30mm f/3.5 fisheye lens

Overview
- Maker: Mamiya
- Type: Single-lens reflex
- Released: 1999 - Present

Lens
- Lens mount: Mamiya 645 bayonet
- Lens: Interchangeable lens

Sensor/medium
- Sensor: Various interchangeable backs (645AFD and later)
- Film format: 120 film (prior to 645DF models)
- Film size: 6x4.5cm (645)
- Film speed: Varies
- Film advance: Automatic

Focusing
- Focus: Auto focus (with manual override)

Exposure/metering
- Exposure: Manual, Aperture Priority, Shutter Priority, or Program
- Exposure metering: Through fixed prism
- Metering modes: Center-weighted, spot-metering, or matrix

Viewfinder
- Viewfinder: Fixed prism finder

General
- Made in: Japan

The Mamiya 645 Autofocus (AF) system was launched in 1999 with the 645AF. It was a departure from the previous manual system, in that the finders and grips were no longer detachable and interchangeable. It still used the same lens mount, but the new autofocus lenses did not have an aperture ring; rather, the lens aperture was controlled by dials on the camera. Manual-focus lenses could still be used on the autofocus cameras, but not vice versa. If manual focus lenses are used, the lens aperture must be set before metering the scene (known as "stop-down metering") which made the manual-focus lenses of limited usefulness compared to the newer autofocus lenses.

=== Mamiya 645 auto focus cameras ===
- Mamiya 645AF (1999) — Similar to 645 Pro TL, but power winder and AE prism finder are both built in. Maximum shutter speed increases to 1/4000, and minimum shutter speed improves to 30 seconds, while flash sync improves to 1/125. Autofocus is implemented with single-focus, continuous-focus, and manual focus modes. Takes 120/220 film backs only
- Mamiya 645AFD (2001) — Added communication interface for digital backs, otherwise similar to the 645AF.
- Mamiya 645AFD II (2005) — Updated version of 645AFD with minor changes.
- Mamiya 645AFD III (Phase One 645AF) (2008) — Updated version of 645AFD II with minor changes.
- Mamiya 645DF (Phase One 645DF) (2009) — A completely new camera, but it uses the same lenses as the rest of the Mamiya 645 AF system. It supports digital backs only (no film backs)
- Mamiya 645DF+ (Phase One 645DF+) (2012-current) — A minor update of the 645DF with reworked internals for higher reliability. Supports more than 50 different digital backs and 80 different lenses, including native Mamiya lenses and Hasselblad V lenses.

==== Mamiya ZD series cameras ====
- Mamiya ZD (2004) — fixed-back medium-format DSLR. The same 22 megapixel sensor was also available in the ZD Back.

=== Mamiya 645 Autofocus Lenses ===
==== Lens abbreviations ====
- AF — the lens has autofocus
- APO — the lens has an apochromatic design
- Asph — the lens has aspherical element(s)
- D — the lens is optimized for digital sensors (even if still manually-focused)
- IF — the lens has internal focusing
- LS — the lens has a Leaf shutter integrated into the lens
- M (Macro) — the lens is optimized for close focusing and close-up (macro) photography
- SK — the lens is co-branded as a Schneider-Kreuznach lens
- ULD — the lens has "ultra low dispersion" glass used in its design
- Zoom — the lens has a variable focal length

Mamiya 645 Autofocus Lenses
Focal length	Aperture	Lens features	Macro	Leaf shutter	Aperture range	Elements / Groups	Minimum focusing	Filter Size	Weight	Equivalent Focal Length in 35mm format	Equivalent Aperture in 35mm format
28mm	f/4.5	AF D Asph	No	No	4.5-32	14 / 10	0.35 m	Gelatin filter frame	885g	17 mm	f/2.8
28mm	f/4.5	AF D LS Asph	No	Yes	4.5-32	14 / 10	0.35 m	Gelatin filter frame	886g	17 mm	f/2.8
35mm	f/3.5	AF D SK LS	No	Yes	3.5-32	11 / 8	0.50 m	105 mm	1370g	22 mm	f/2.2
35mm	f/3.5	AF D	No	No	3.5-32	9 / 7	0.35 m	77 mm	480g	22 mm	f/2.2
45mm	f/2.8	AF D	No	No	2.8-22	9 / 7	0.45 m	67 mm	530g	28 mm	f/1.8
55mm	f/2.8	AF D	No	No	2.8-22	7 / 6	0.45 m	58 mm	445g	34 mm	f/1.8
55mm	f/2.8	AF D SK LS	No	Yes	2.8-22	7 / 6	0.45 m	72 mm	630g	34 mm	f/1.8
80mm	f/2.8	AF D	No	No	2.8-22	6 / 5	0.70 m	67 mm	330g	50 mm	f/1.8
80mm	f/2.8	AF D LS	No	Yes	2.8-22	6 / 5	0.70 m	67 mm	330g	50 mm	f/1.8
80mm	f/2.8	AF D SK LS	No	Yes	2.8-22	6 / 5	0.70 m	72 mm	500g	50 mm	f/1.8
110mm	f/2.8	AF D LS	No	Yes	2.8-22	6 / 5	0.90 m	72 mm	700g	68 mm	f/1.8
120mm	f/4	D Macro	Yes	No	4-22	9 / 8	0.40 m	67 mm	835g	74 mm	f/2.5
120mm	f/4	AF D Macro	Yes	No	4-32	9 / 8	0.37 m	67 mm	960g	74 mm	f/2.5
120mm	f/4	AF D SK LS Macro	Yes	Yes	4-32	9 / 8	0.37 m	86 mm	960g	74 mm	f/2.5
120mm	f/5.6	D SK Asph Tilt-shift	No	No	5.6-22	6 / 4	0.84 m	Bayonet VIII	1038g	74 mm	f/3.5
150mm	f/2.8	AF D IF	No	No	2.8-22	8 / 7	1.0 m	72 mm	780g	93 mm	f/1.8
150mm	f/3.5	AF D	No	No	3.5-32	5 / 5	1.5 m	58 mm	540g	93 mm	f/2.2
150mm	f/3.5	AF D SK LS	No	Yes	3.5-32	5 / 5	1.5 m	72 mm	645g	93 mm	f/2.2
210mm	f/4	AF D ULD IF	No	No	4-32	7 / 5	2.0 m	58 mm	750g	130 mm	f/2.5
240mm	f/4.5	AF D LS IF	No	Yes	4.5-22	8 / 8	1.7m	86 mm	1600g	149 mm	f/2.8
300mm	f/4.5	AF D APO IF	No	No	4.5-32	8 / 8	3.0 m	77 mm	1430g	186 mm	f/2.8
55-110mm	f/4.5	AF zoom	No	No	4.5-32	11 / 10	1.5 m	67 mm	870g	34–68 mm	f/2.8
75-150mm	f/4.5	AF D zoom	No	No	4.5-32	11 / 10	1.0 m	77 mm	1140g	47–93 mm	f/2.8
75-150mm	f/4.5-5.6	AF D SK LS zoom	No	Yes	4.5(5.6)-32(45)	11 / 10	1.0 m	95 mm	1700g	47–93 mm	f/2.8
105-210mm	f/4.5	AF D ULD zoom	No	No	4.5-32	13 / 11	1.5 m	58 mm	990g	65–130 mm	f/2.8

Some Mamiya 645 AF lenses are also sold as Phase One lenses. Phase One also sells Schneider-Kreuznach lenses, which are also branded as Mamiya. See the history of Mamiya for more information.

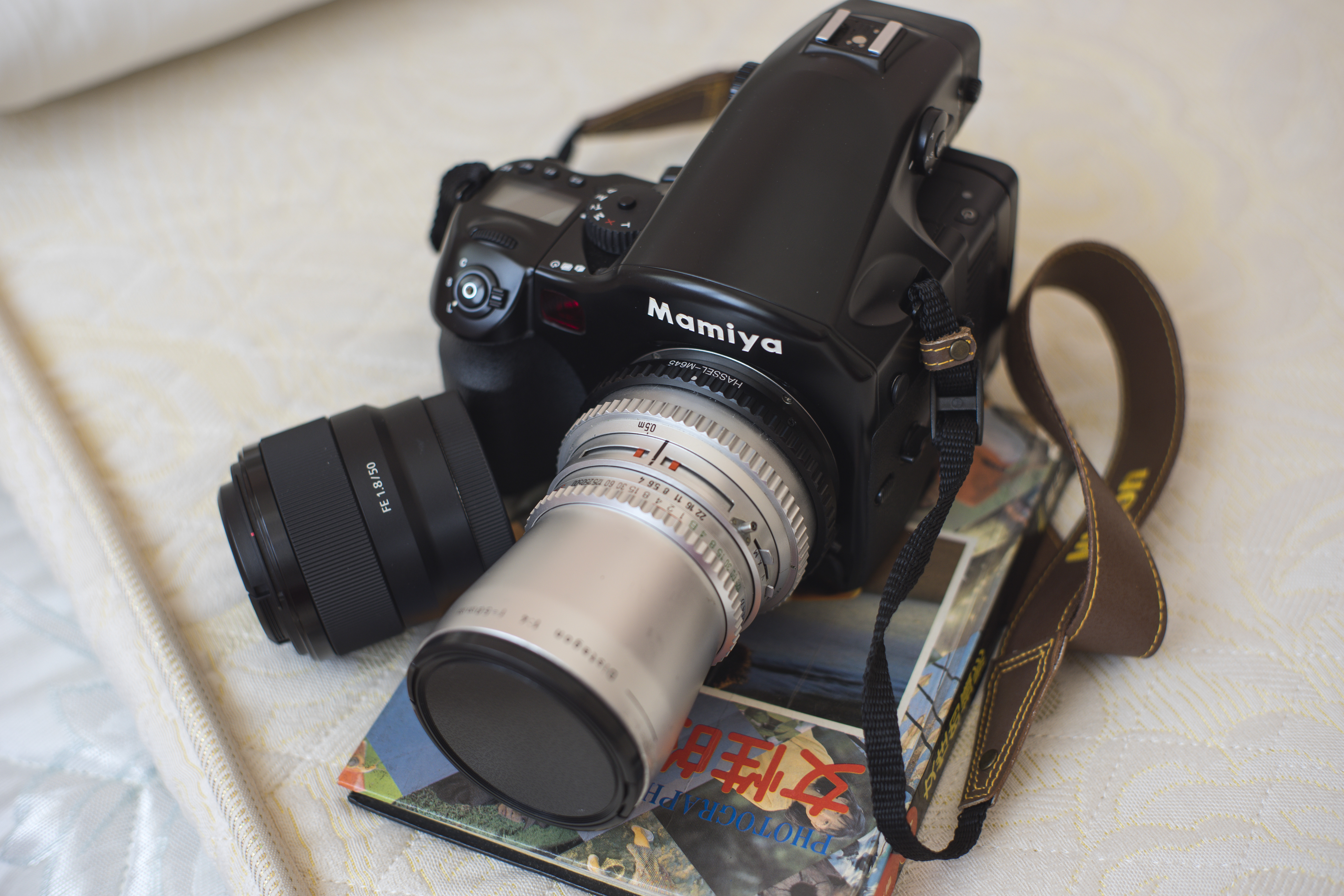
Mamiya 645AFD camera with Hasselblad 50mm Distagon Lens, using the Hasselblad adapter

=== Mamiya 645 AF System Accessories ===
- V-Grip Air GB401 - for shooting comfortably in portrait mode
- Dual charger - for dual battery charging
- External battery case PE401
- Schneider-Kreuznach 2x teleconverter - AF lenses will become manual focus
- Angle finder FA401 - 360 degree rotatable angle finder
- Magnifier FD402 - for macro and telephoto work
- Auto extension tubes NA401, NA402, NA403 - for macro work
- Auto bellows NC401 with reversing ring - for macro work
- Cable Releases - RE401 (1m long) and RE402 (5m long)
- Adapters for RB67 and RZ67 bodies - to attach DM digital back to RB67 or RZ67 body
- Remote control unit RS402
- Various flash accessories for Metz flashes
- Various lens hoods including bellows-style
- Various focusing screens (up to eight options depending on the camera body)
- Carbon-fiber tripod, monopod, and tripod head system
- Aluminum carrying case and other cases
- Hasselblad V lens mount adapters (black #HBB NR404 800-53200A, and silver #HBW NR405 800-53400A)

== See also ==
- Mamiya
- List of Mamiya Products
- Medium format (film)
- 120 film
