= RB 67 =

RB 67 is the designation of several regional rail services in Germany:

- RB 67, operated by Bayerische Regiobahn between Augsburg-Oberhausen and Schongau
- RB 67, operated by DB Regio Mitte between Frankfurt (Main) and Mannheim
- RB 67, operated by DB Regio Mitte between Kusel and Kaiserslautern
- RB 67, operated by Eurobahn between Münster and Bielefeld

== See also ==
- Mamiya RB67
