= Mamiya RZ67 =

Medium format film camera

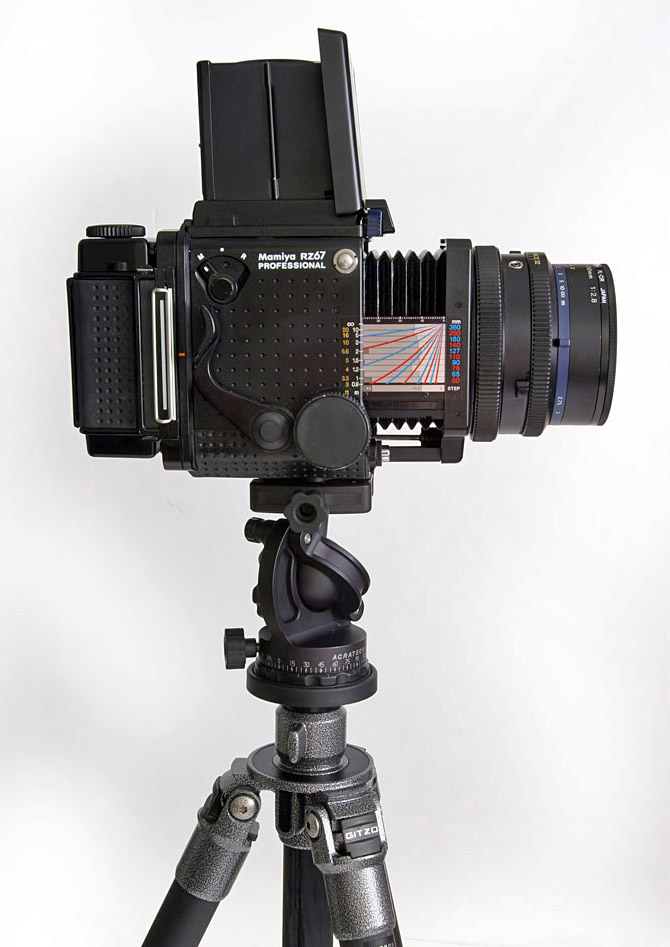
- RZ67 Pro I ready for shooting

Overview
- Maker: Mamiya
- Type: Medium Format SLR

Lens
- Lens mount: Custom Mamiya breech-lock bayonet mount

Sensor/medium
- Film speed: ISO 25 to 6400 [manual]

Focusing
- Focus: Manual

Exposure/metering
- Exposure: Manual, Aperture Priority with AE prism

Flash
- Flash: Hot shoe, PC socket

Shutter
- Frame rate: Manual lever winding, unmodified.
- Shutter speed range: 8 s to 1/400 s, Bulb, Time

General
- Battery: 4LR44 6 V battery or 4 LR44 1.5 volt batteries
- Made in: Japan

The Mamiya RZ67 is a professional medium format single-lens reflex camera manufactured by Mamiya. There are three successive models: the RZ67 Professional (released in 1982), RZ67 Professional II (released in 1993) and RZ67 Professional IID (released in 2004). It is primarily designed for studio use, but can also be used in the field.

== Details ==
The RZ67 is a modular camera system, meaning the lenses, viewfinders, ground glass, film winders and film backs designed for the system are all interchangeable. The RZ67's Sekor lenses have built-in electronic leaf shutters which are cocked and triggered from the body. Focusing is performed with a set of bellows.

The camera accepts 120 and 220 film film with film backs configurable for 6×7 cm, 6×6 cm and 6×4.5 cm exposures. These backs are rotating, allowing for both landscape and portrait orientation without removing the back. Special-purpose backs allow for the use of Polaroid film as well as Quadra 72 4×5 sheet film. Mamiya RB67 backs are also supported via the G-Adapter. The film speed is set on each RZ back via a dial. There are two versions of the 6×7 and 6×4.5 backs. The model II versions have a second film counter to always show the film count on the top, regardless of the back orientation.

The RZ67 operates on one 6V 4SR44 silver oxide battery, or 6V 4LR44 alkaline battery. It can be used in an emergency with a mechanical mode fixed at 1/400 sec shutter speed. Multiple exposures are possible in the M-mode. Mirror lock up is supported for long exposures and macro photography. The body has one standard flash hot shoe on its left side, one plug for a standard shutter cable release, and a PC socket for an electronic shutter trigger. The RZ67 measures 104mm (W) × 133.5mm (H) × 211.5mm (L) with the 110mm f/2.8 lens, and weighs approximately 2.4 kg (5.29 lbs). The flange distance is 105mm.

The RZ67 name is adopted from the model name of the Mamiya RB67 (in which RB stands for "Revolving Back"), which was first introduced in 1970. The main difference between RB67 and RZ67 is that the RB67 is completely mechanical. The RZ67 body is able to transmit exposure information from the lens to the body. In addition, the RZ67 has plastic exterior body, making it somewhat lighter. Similar to the RB67, the RZ67 film backs can be rotated 90 degrees to provide a horizontal or vertical composition. The orientation is shown in the viewfinder with black guides. The viewfinder also hosts LEDs informing of the state of the camera (flash ready, low battery, dark slide not removed, shutter not cocked). Both cameras also can manually set their shutter speed and aperture. In addition to manual operation, the RZ67 is able to operate in an automatic exposure mode with an AE viewfinder, which transmits exposure information directly to the body. In L compatibility mode, the RZ67 is able to use RB67 lenses.

== Versions ==
Original RZ67 Professional (RZ67 Pro I):

- Electronic shutter 8 sec: 1/400 sec with full EV steps

RZ67 Professional II (RZ67 Pro II):

- Some improvements of the electronics
- An additional knob was added to the right side of the focusing unit for fine tuning of the focus
- Shutter can be adjusted in 0.5 EV steps

RZ67 Professional IID (RZ67 Pro IID):

- Has an integrated interface for communicating with digital backs (the earlier versions need either an interface plate or external triggering wires)
- Minor internal mechanical improvements
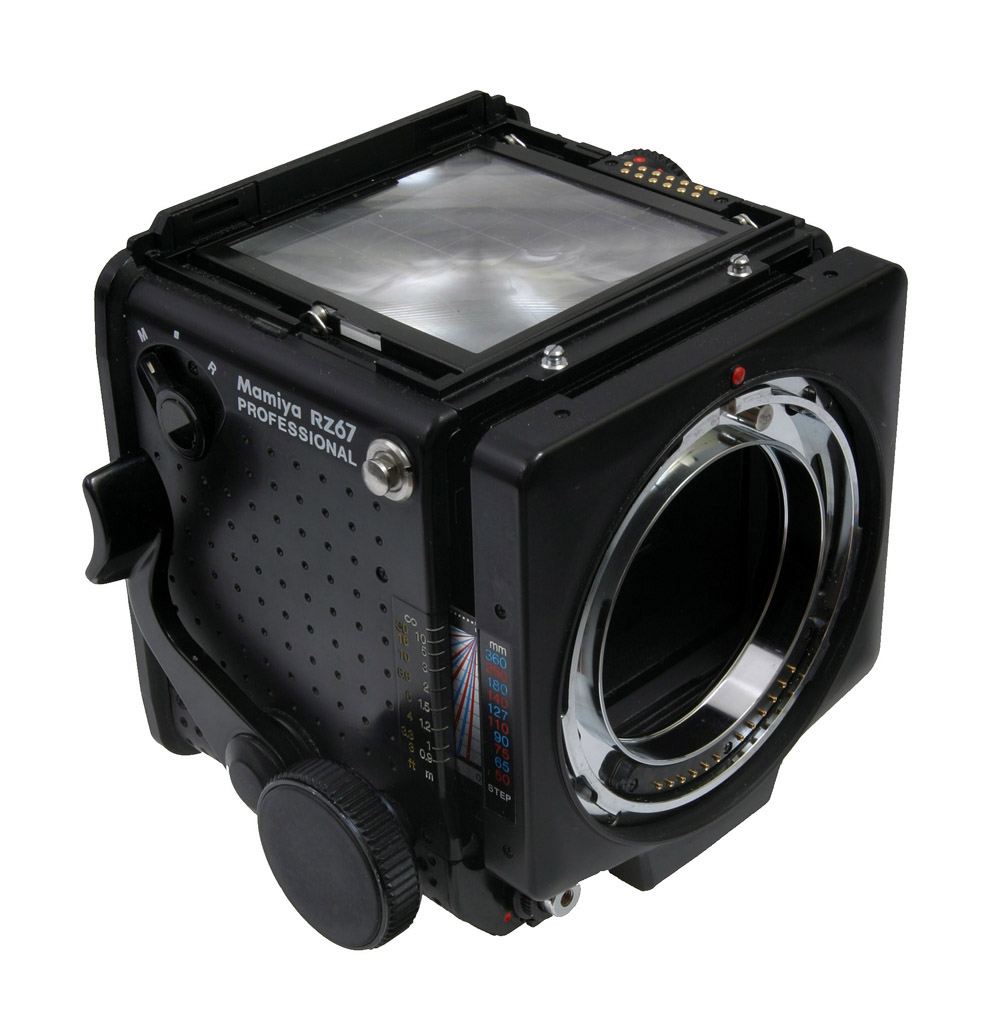
RZ67 Pro I

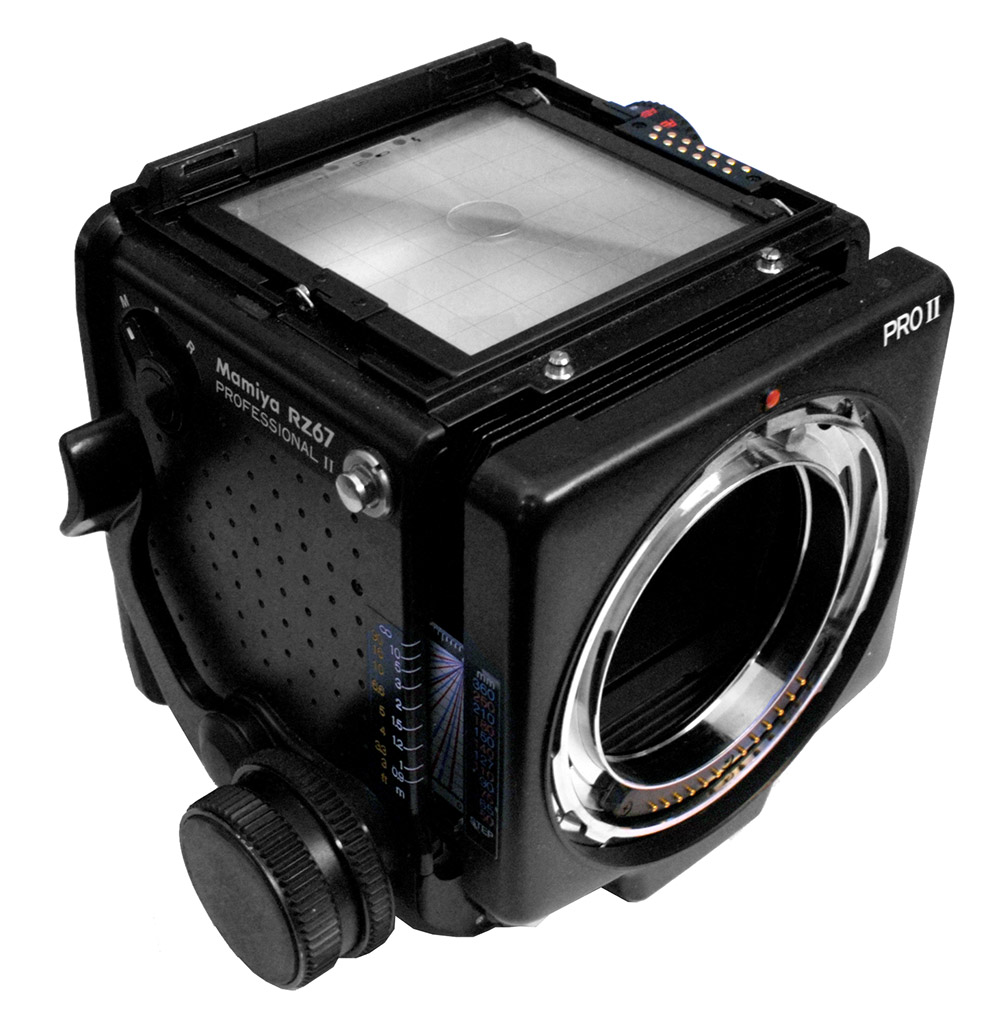
RZ67 Pro II, not much exterior difference between the models except the Pro II version has a critical focus knob.

== Lenses ==
There are a wide variety of lenses available for the RZ67:

- Four wide-angle lenses:

43 mm f/4.5. prototype lens. ULD glass, floating system and aspherical. 21 mm equivalent
50 mm f/4.5. Two versions exist, the non ULD and ULD L (contains floating element), the ULD version is clearly marked. 24 mm equivalent
65 mm f/4, two versions (the second one has a floating element), 32 mm equivalent
75 mm f/3.5, with floating element, 36 mm equivalent

- Three normal lenses:

90 mm f/3.5, with extension tubes 1 and 2 has the largest magnification of all RZ67 lenses, able to shoot 1.92:1. A prototype lens of 90 3.5 M L-A with floating system also exists. 44 mm equivalent
110 mm f/2.8, smallest of the RZ lenses, also has largest aperture, 53 mm equivalent
127 mm f/3.5 and an older model f/3.8, 62 mm equivalent

- Eight telephoto lenses:

150 mm f/3.5, 73 mm equivalent
180 mm f/4.5, three generations, W-N version is the latest and has improved optics, 87 mm equivalent
210 mm f/4.5 APO, apochromatically corrected design, 102 mm equivalent
250 mm f/4.5, 2 versions (newer one is APO), 121 mm equivalent
350 mm f/5.6 APO, 170 mm equivalent
360 mm f/6.0, an older lens, 175 mm equivalent
500 mm f/6 APO and an older model f/8, longest of the RZ lenses, 238 mm equivalent

- Seven specialty lenses:

37 mm f/4.5 Fisheye, (the widest RZ lens), captures 180 degrees diagonally across the frame, does not correct distortion, 18 mm equivalent
75 mm f/4.5 Short Barrel, possible to use with a tilt/shift adapter for perspective and focus plane control, needs an SB spacer for normal 75 mm use, 36 mm equivalent
75 mm f/4.5 Shift, perspective control lens, needs manual cocking of the shutter, 36 mm equivalent
140 mm f/4.5 Macro, two versions - "Mamiya M Macro L-A" and "Mamiya-Sekor Macro Z W" (both containing floating element system with "M" being the newer of the two, producing better results), able to shoot 1:3 without extension tubes or bellows and 1.22:1 with extension tubes 1 and 2, 68 mm equivalent
180 mm f/4 Variable Soft Focus, uses three interchangeable diffusion and spherical aberration disks for soft effect, 87 mm equivalent
180 mm f/4.5 Short Barrel, for tilt and shift adapter, needs an SB spacer for normal 180 mm use, 87 mm equivalent
100-200 mm f/5.2 Zoom, the only RZ zoom lens, 48-97 mm equivalent

All RB67 lenses are mechanical only

All lenses have internal electronic Seiko #1 shutters with a maximum 1/400 sec speed, PC-type X flash sync plug, T-switch for long exposures, a plug for a standard cable release for B exposures, depth of field preview lever, distance scale, aperture adjust ring. In "B" mode, the RZ67 models will expose up to 30 seconds (a warning beep will sound for the last 10 seconds). In "T" mode, the camera can expose indefinitely without drawing power from the battery. Most lenses, except for the 37mm, 75mm shift lenses and the 500mm lenses have 77mm filter threads on the front of the lens. Those lenses have 105mm filter threads. Some lenses have a floating element; focusing these lenses involves setting a subject distance ring on the lens after focusing with the bellows.

== Accessories ==
- Waist level viewfinder with a magnifier loupe (interchangeable with different dioptre adjusts)
- AE prism, prism and chimney viewfinders
- Vertical split image, matte, matte with corners, checker (default), microprism, crosshair and rangefinderspot microprism ground glasses
- Variable dioptre flip-up magnifier for RB and RZ prism finders
- G-2 Bellows lens hood (a simpler version of the G-3 Bellows lens hood)
- G-3 Bellows lens hood (65–350mm lens adjustable)
- Bellows front hood extension for G-3 bellows lens hood
- 100–200mm zoom lens mounting ring, prevents G-3 from rotating when zooming
- Gelatine filter holder for 50–350mm lenses
- Adjustable sun shield plate
- Metz SCA 395 flash module
- Hot shoe PC flash adapter
- Quick shoe for fast attaching and detaching for tripods
- Mirror-lock-up dual cable release (attaches both to body and lens)
- External battery case for keeping battery warm in cold weather
- Electromagnetic cable release
- Left hand grip (L-Grip) and U-shaped Aerial Grip, these attach to the electronic coupling on the body
- Adjustable flash bracket
- Infrared transmitter and receiver
- Tilt/Shift adapter for 75mm and 180mm SB lenses, with special electronic cable release adapter
- Ground glass for Tilt/Shift adapter
- Power winder, winds 1 frame per 1.5 sec, uses six AA cells, attaches to the base of the body
- 1.4× tele converter for best use with 90mm, 110mm, 127mm, 140mm, 180mm and 100–200mm lenses
- 45mm and 82mm auto extension tubes, electronically coupled
- short barrel spacer for use with the 75mm and 180mm short barrel lenses without the Tilt/Shift adapter at infiniti
- viewfinder masks for the 6×6 cm and 6×4.5 cm backs

Polaroid also made a radio transmitter and receiver for the RZ series.

== Famous photos ==
Arguably the most famous photo taken with this camera is the "Bliss" photo used as the default background for Microsoft Windows XP. Seen by millions of people every day, this photo was taken by photographer Charles O'Rear in 1996.

The RZ67 was used by Annie Leibovitz for many of her famous works in the 1980s and 1990s. Allan Warren also used the RZ67 for many of his portraits.
