= Mamiya RB67 =

Medium format single-lens reflex camera

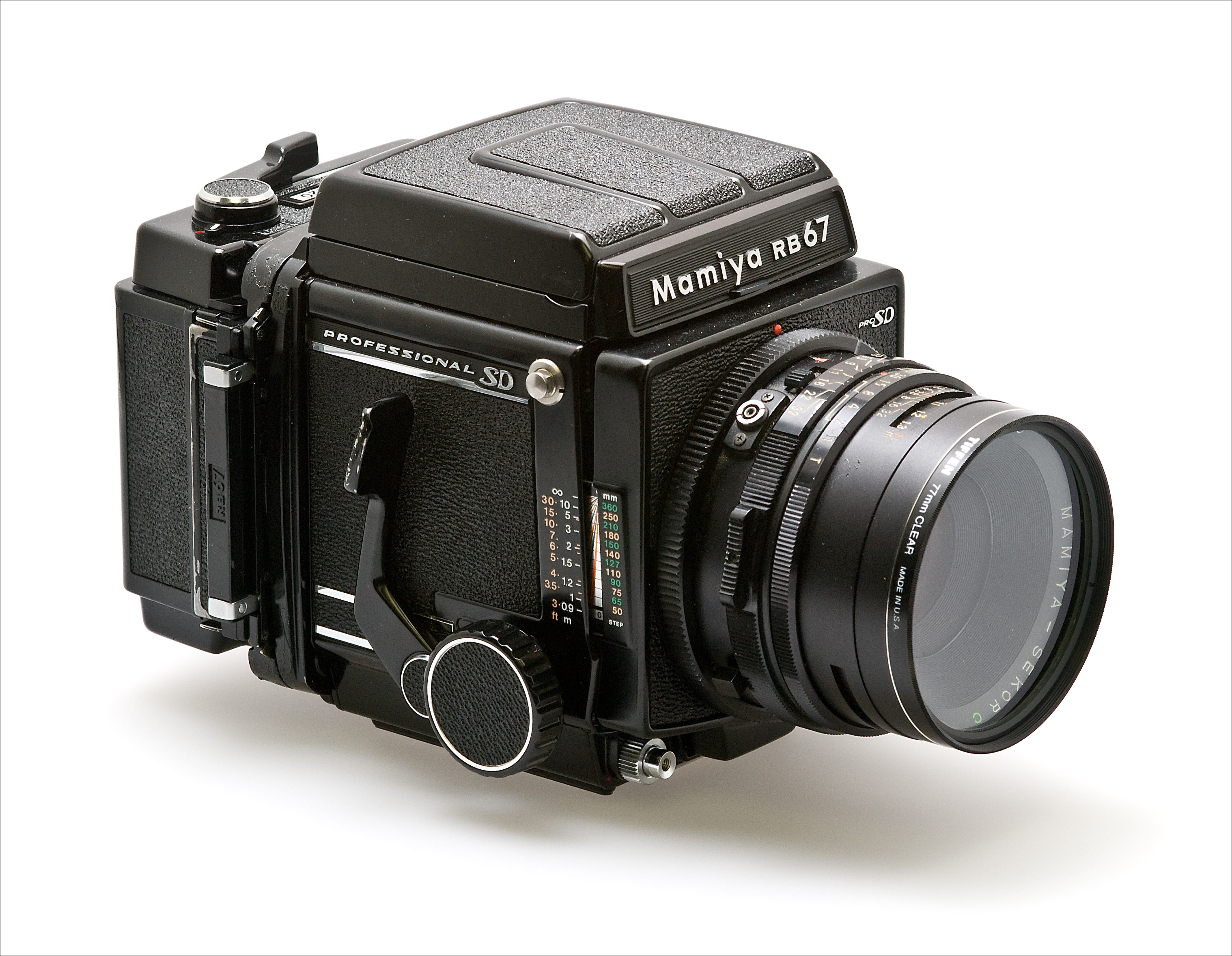

Overview
- Maker: Mamiya
- Type: Medium Format SLR
- Released: 1970: RB67 Professional; 1974: RB67 Pro-S; 1990: RB67 Pro-SD
- Production: 1970-2010

Lens
- Lens mount: Custom Mamiya breech-lock bayonet mount

Sensor/medium
- Recording medium: 120 film

Focusing
- Focus: Manual

Exposure/metering
- Exposure: Manual

Flash
- Flash: PC socket

Shutter
- Frame rate: Manual lever winding, unmodified.
- Shutter speed range: 1 s to 1/400 s, Time

General
- Dimensions: 104×139×226 mm (4.1×5.5×8.9 in) (W×H×L) (with the 90 mm f/3.8 lens)
- Weight: 2.69 kg (5.9 lb)
- Made in: Japan

The Mamiya RB67 is a professional medium format single-lens reflex system camera manufactured by Mamiya. There are three successive models: the RB67 Professional (released in 1970), RB67 Pro-S (released in 1974) and RB67 Pro-SD (released in 1990). It is primarily designed for studio use, but can also be used in the field.

== Details ==
The RB67 Professional was introduced in 1970 with a similar look to popular medium format SLR cameras like the Hasselblad V series, but was larger due to the larger 6×7 cm frame size. However, the RB67 differed visually from other medium format cameras of the time, which resemble very large 35mm cameras.

The RB67 is a modular camera system. This means lenses, viewfinders, ground glass, and film backs are interchangeable. There is no focal plane shutter in the RB67. The RB67's Sekor lenses have mechanical leaf shutters which are cocked on the body and triggered either from a threaded shutter release on the lens or from the body's shutter button. Focusing is performed with bellows on the body. Though the RB67 is a completely mechanical camera there are a variety of motorized film backs and automatic exposure finders that do require batteries.

The camera accepts 120 and 220 film, with interchangeable film backs configured for exposures of 6x7cm, 6x6cm, or 6x4.5 cm. Special-purpose film backs allow for motorized operation, 6x8cm exposures, use of 70mm film, or Polaroid film. Multiple exposures are supported as the shutter and film advance are not linked. It measures 104×139×226 mm (4.1×5.5×8.9 in) (W×H×L) with the 90mm f/3.8 lens mounted, and weighs approximately 2.69 kg (5.9 lb). The flange distance is 110 mm.

The RB stands for "Rotating Back", a concept dating back to early Graflex cameras as early as 1907. The RB67 film backs can be rotated 90 degrees to provide a horizontal or vertical composition. The orientation is shown in the ground glass with a combination of black frame lines.

== The Mamiya evolution ==
Mamiya began producing folding cameras for 120 medium format film in 1940 during World War II. They introduced their first medium format twin lens reflex camera in 1948, and through the 1950s they built TLR cameras similar to the German-made Rolleiflex Automat. In 1957 they introduced the Mamiyaflex C which incorporated several common features from large format press cameras: a bellows focusing system, and interchangeable lenses. It is regarded as the most advanced TLR system of its time. Despite their initial popularity with the press photographers, by the late 1960s other manufacturers were successfully producing and marketing medium format SLRs with interchangeable film backs, allowing a photographer to change film stocks without changing camera bodies.

While several competitors offered medium format SLR cameras, there was not a successful offering with bellows focusing and a rotating back. New medium format SLR offerings in the late 1960s, like the Pentax 6×7, began to resemble conventional 35mm SLR cameras. To compete, Mamiya added the RB67 alongside their advanced TLR, the C330, but using a horizontal film path, interchangeable film backs, while retaining the bellows focus and leaf shutter system. Polaroid exchangeable backs allowed instant photography with many professional cameras including the RB67.

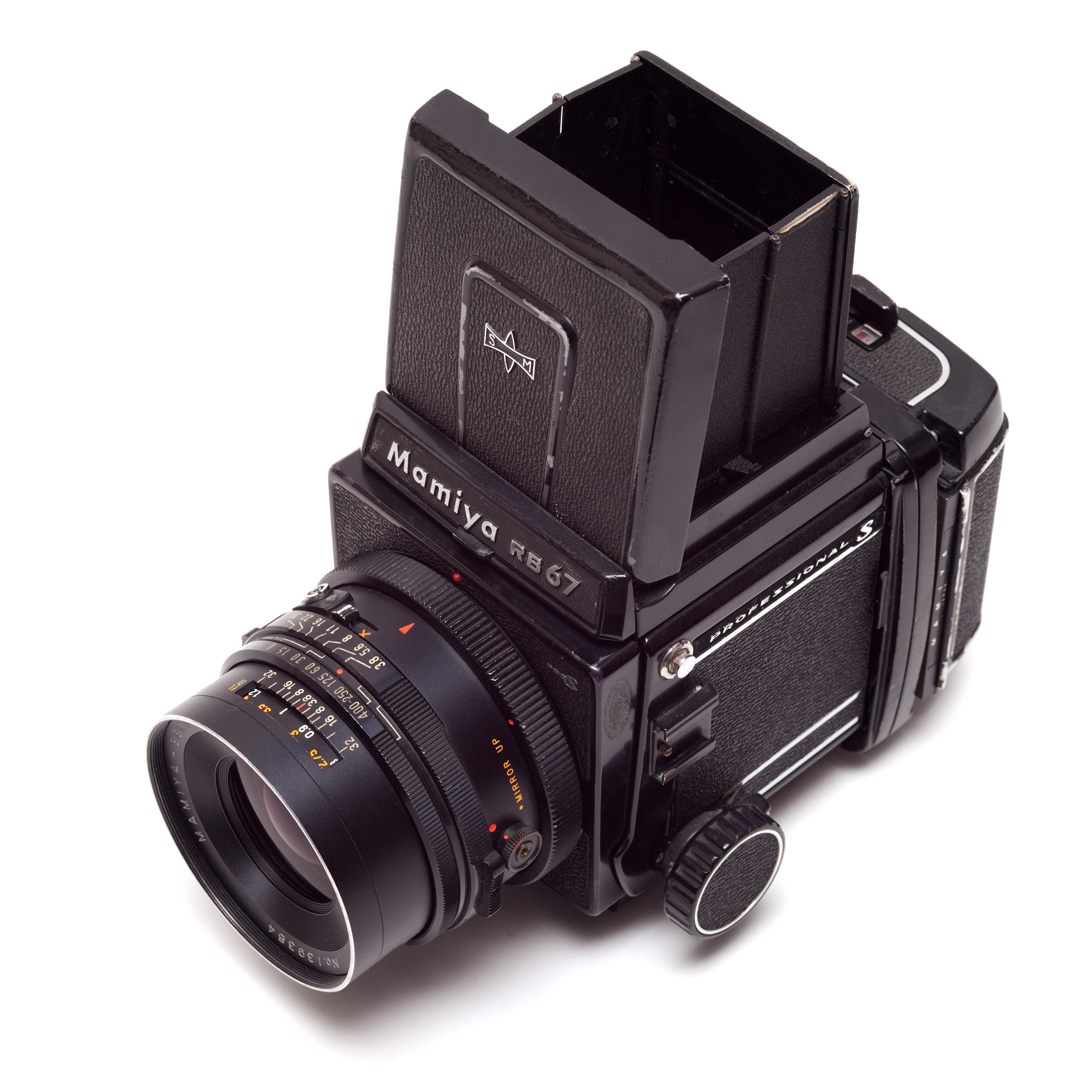

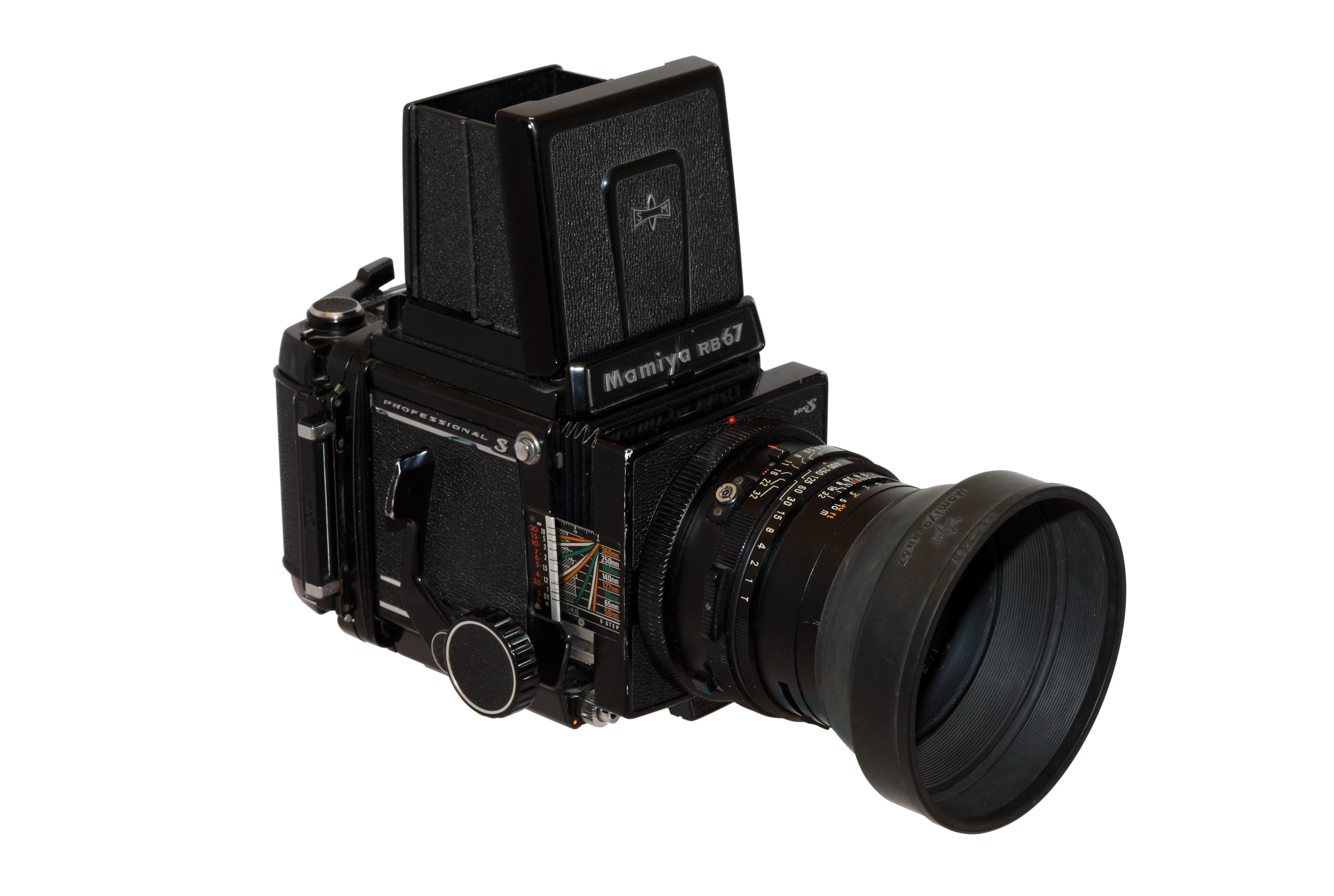

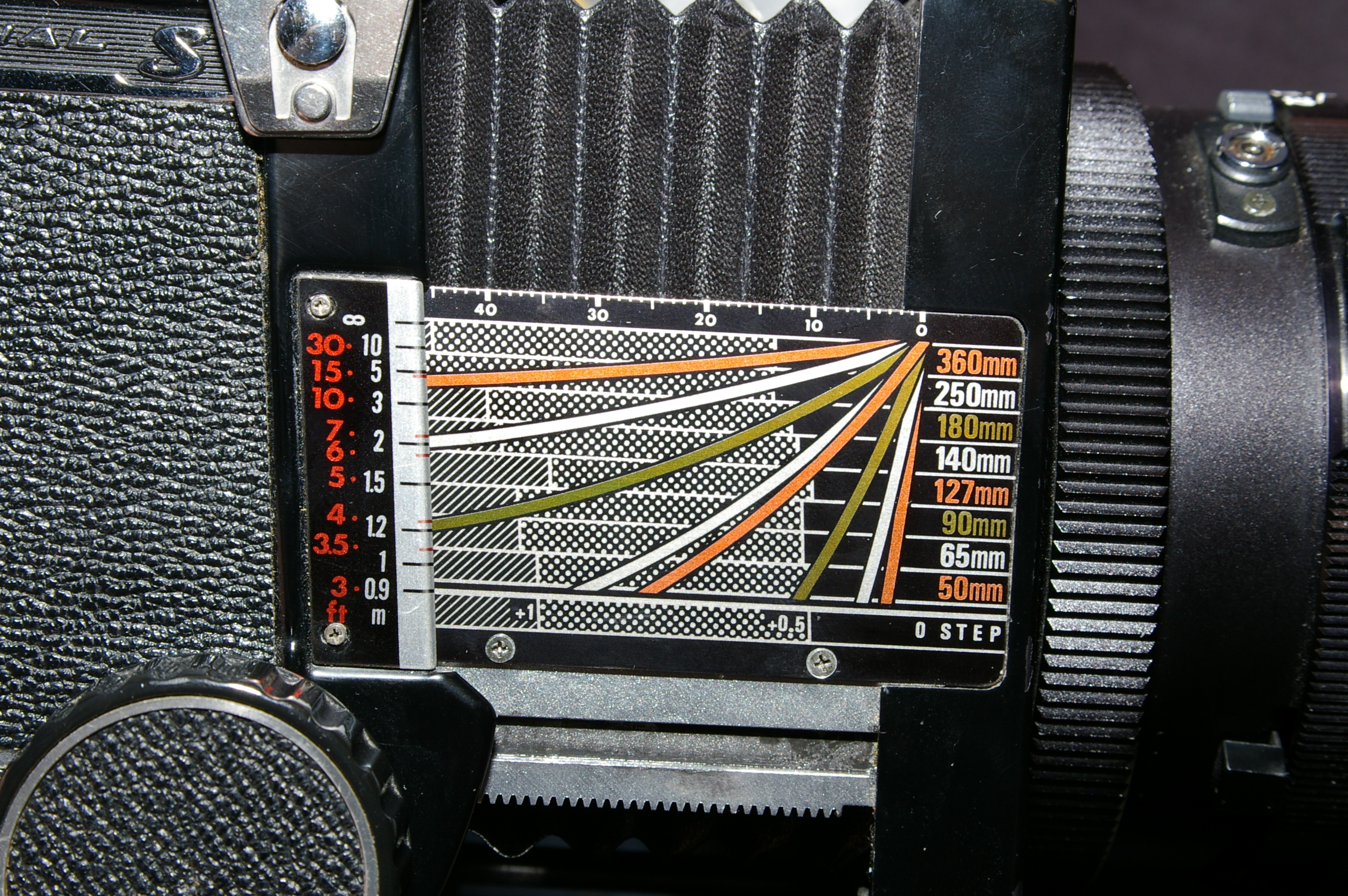

== See also ==
- Mamiya RZ67

== General references ==
- Shell, Bob. Mamiya Medium Format Systems. Hove Pro-Guide. Hove: Hove Photo, 1992. ISBN 9780906447765.
- Moore, Paul. Shooting Old Film Cameras – Mamiya RB67 Professional. Self-published, 2013. ISBN 1481964895.
- Gustavson, Todd. Camera: a History of Photography from Daguerreotype to Digital. Sterling Signature, 2012. ISBN 1454900024.
- Sherman, Bennet. Leaf Shutter SLR: Why?. Popular Photography. January 1960.
