= Mamiya C =

Line of twin-lens reflex cameras by Mamiya

Mamiya C series
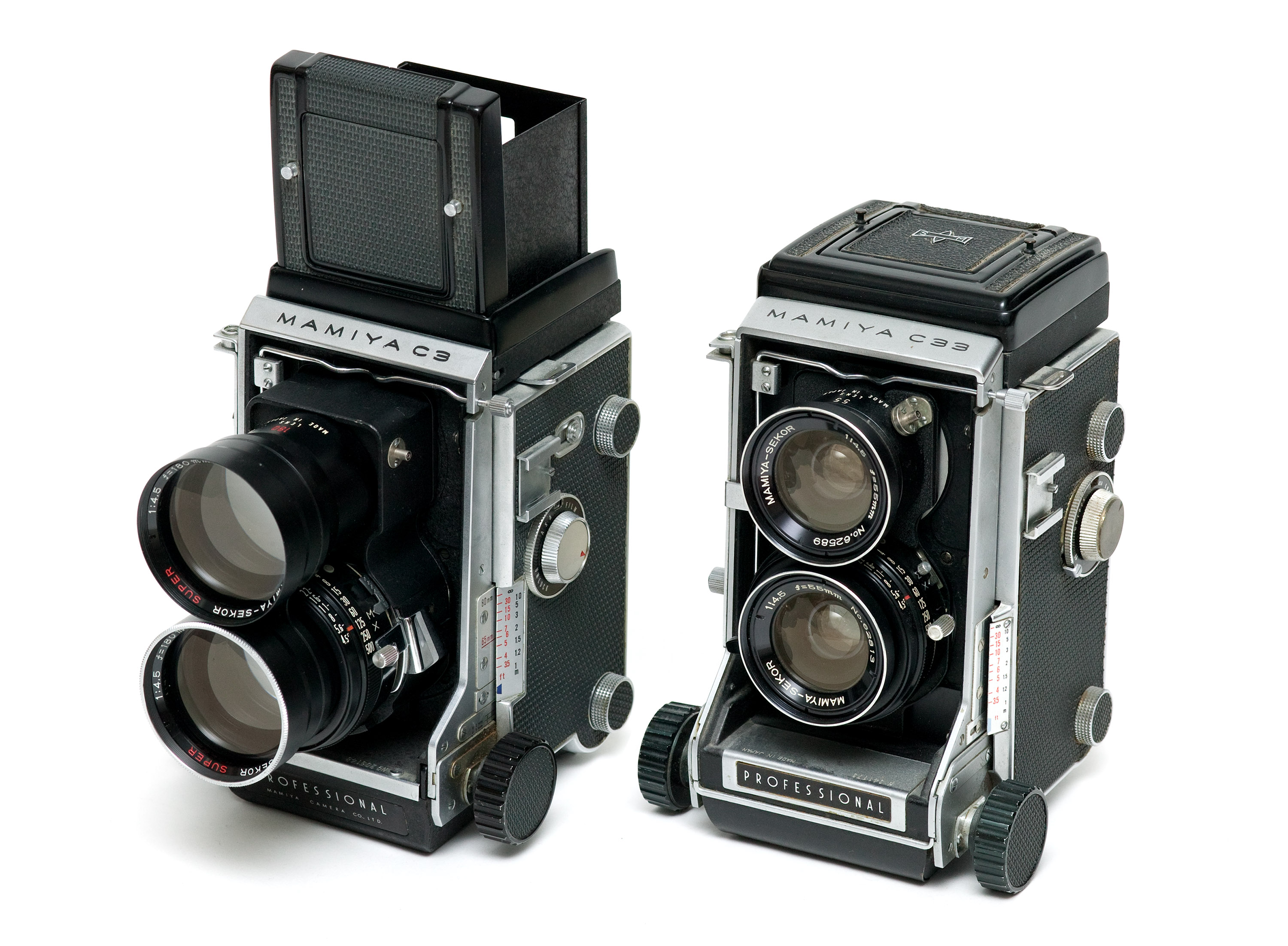
- Mamiya C3 and C33 models

Overview
- Maker: Mamiya
- Type: Twin-lens reflex
- Production: 1956–1994

Lens
- Lens mount: Mamiya C
- Lens: Interchangeable
- Compatible lenses: seven focal lengths, from 55mm to 250mm

Sensor/medium
- Sensor type: Film
- Sensor size: 56 mm × 56 mm (2.2 in × 2.2 in)
- Film format: 120 film
- Film advance: manual, knob or crank
- Film rewind: manual

Focusing
- Focus: manual

Exposure/metering
- Exposure modes: manual
- Exposure metering: in optional viewfinders or external

Shutter
- Shutter: in lens (leaf)
- Shutter speeds: 1–1/400 or 1/500 + B

Viewfinder
- Viewfinder: ground glass, waist-level

Chronology
- Predecessor: Mamiyaflex

The Mamiya C series is a line of twin-lens reflex medium-format system cameras manufactured by Mamiya between 1956 and 1994. It was developed from the Mamiyaflex series of cameras built from 1949 to 1956. The Mamiya C series was initially aimed at the professional market.

== Common features ==
Unlike most TLR cameras, the Mamiya C has interchangeable lenses. The upper and lower lenses come off as a unit, and are available in at least seven different focal lengths. The lower lens of each unit has an aperture diaphragm as well as a leaf shutter. A flash sync terminal is part of the lens unit, and the delay can be set to M or X mode. The camera has an interlocking baffle that enables lenses to be changed without exposing the film.

Focusing is performed via a bellows system on the front side of the camera. Early models had separate film advance and shutter cocking mechanisms; on later models the shutter was automatically cocked as the film was advanced. There is no metering in the camera body, so an external light meter is necessary; later models were compatible with optional accessory viewfinders that had built-in meters.

== Models ==
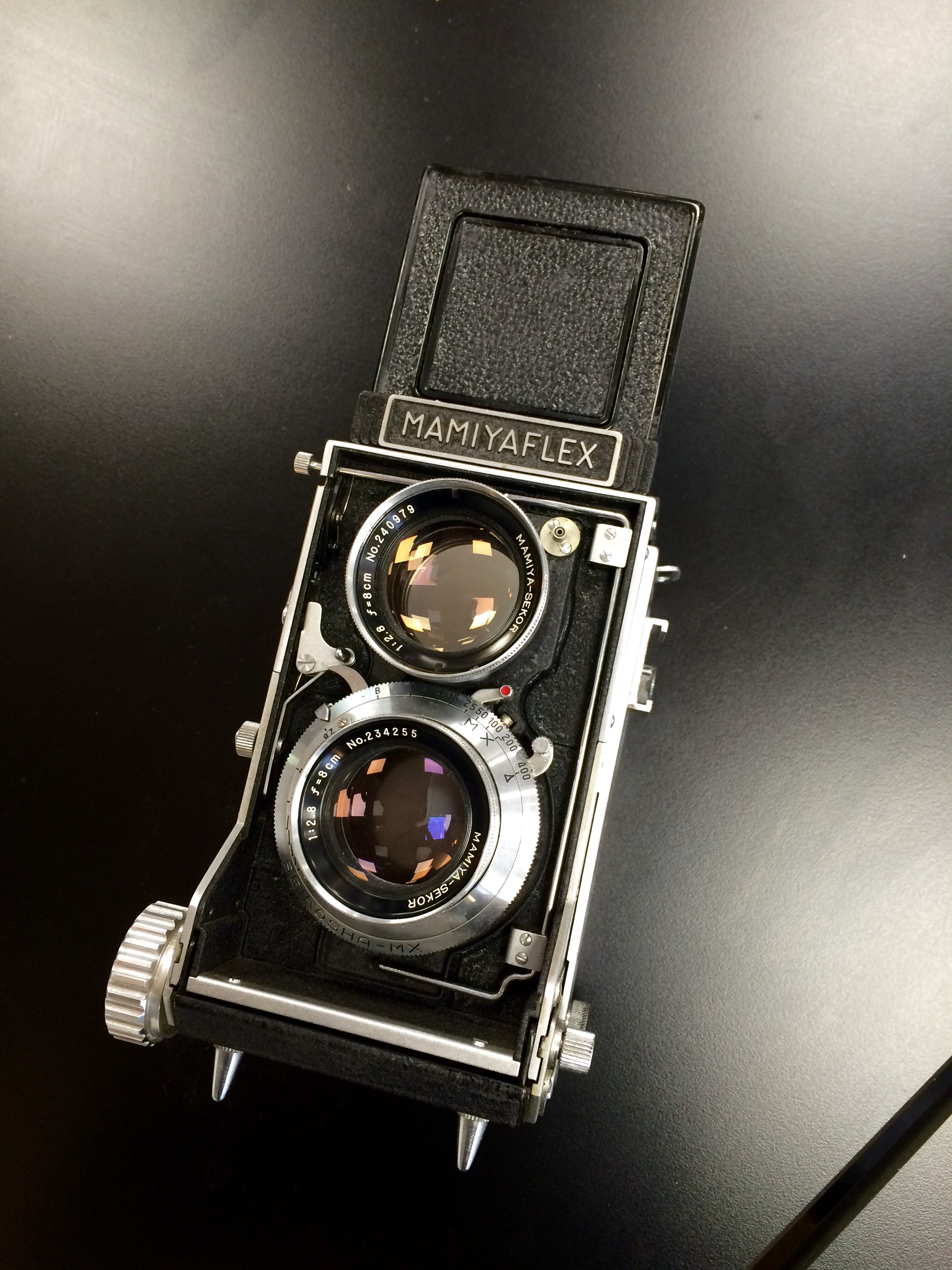
Mamiyaflex C

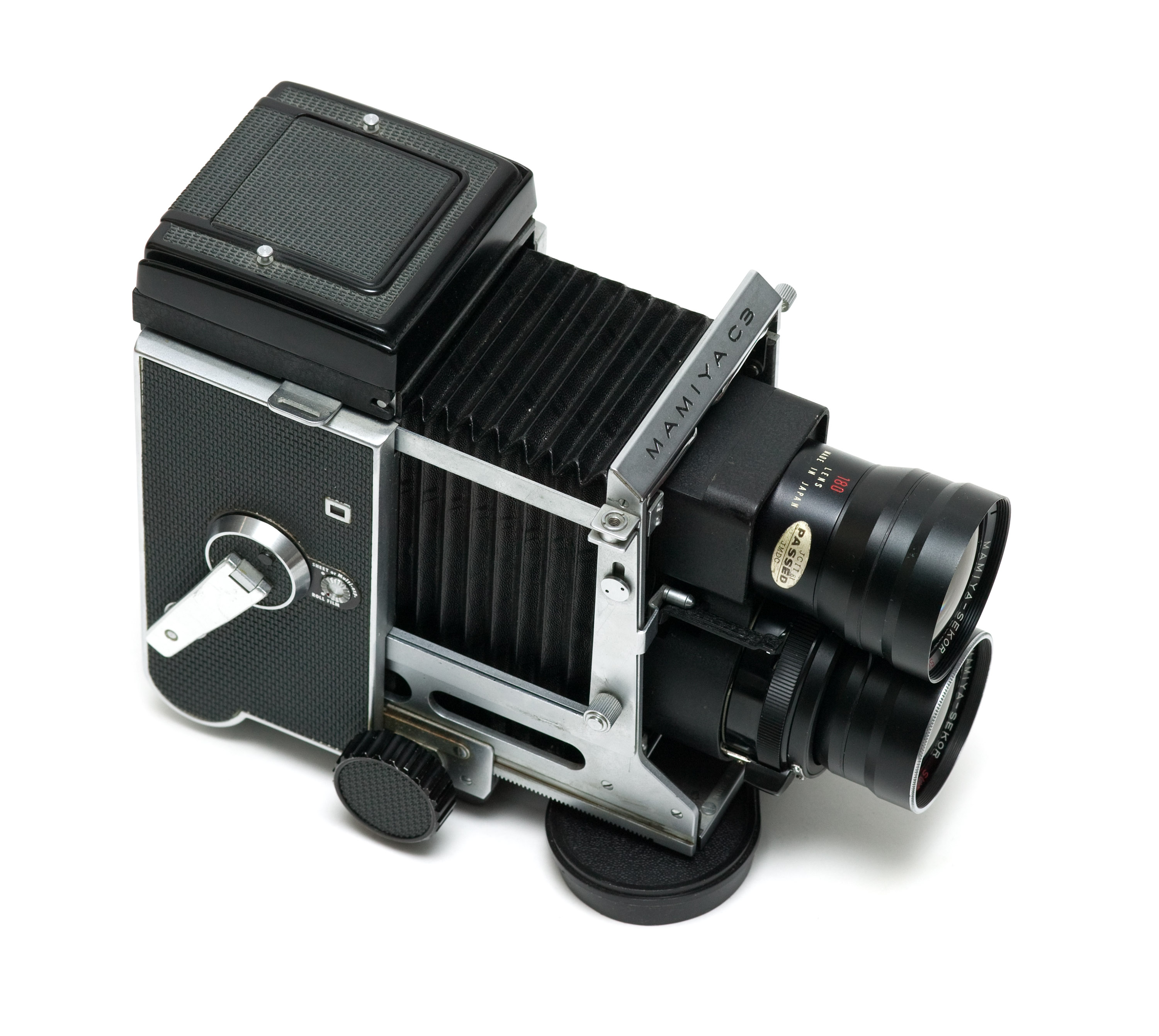
Mamiya C3 with bellows extended

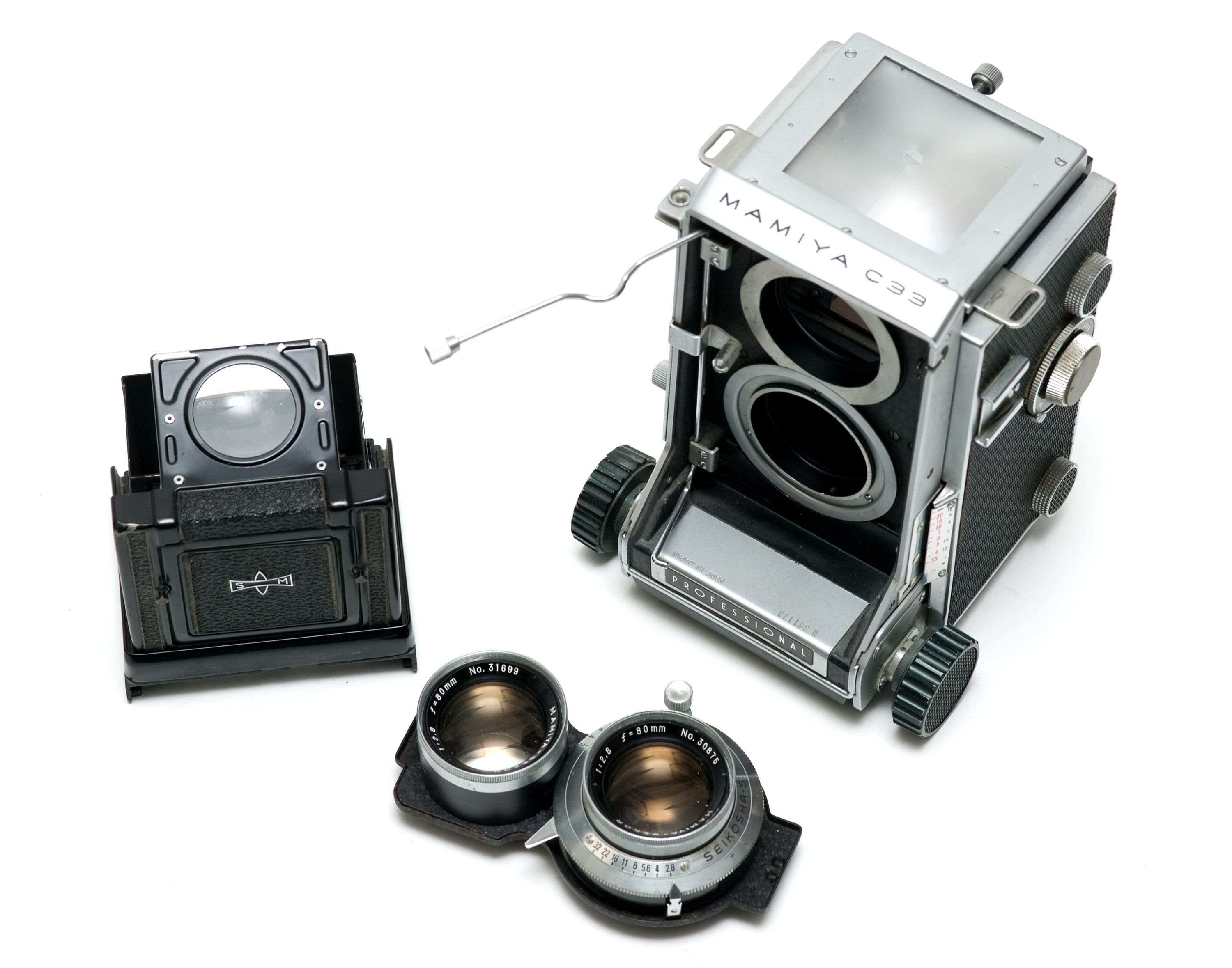
Mamiya C33 with lens and waist finder removed

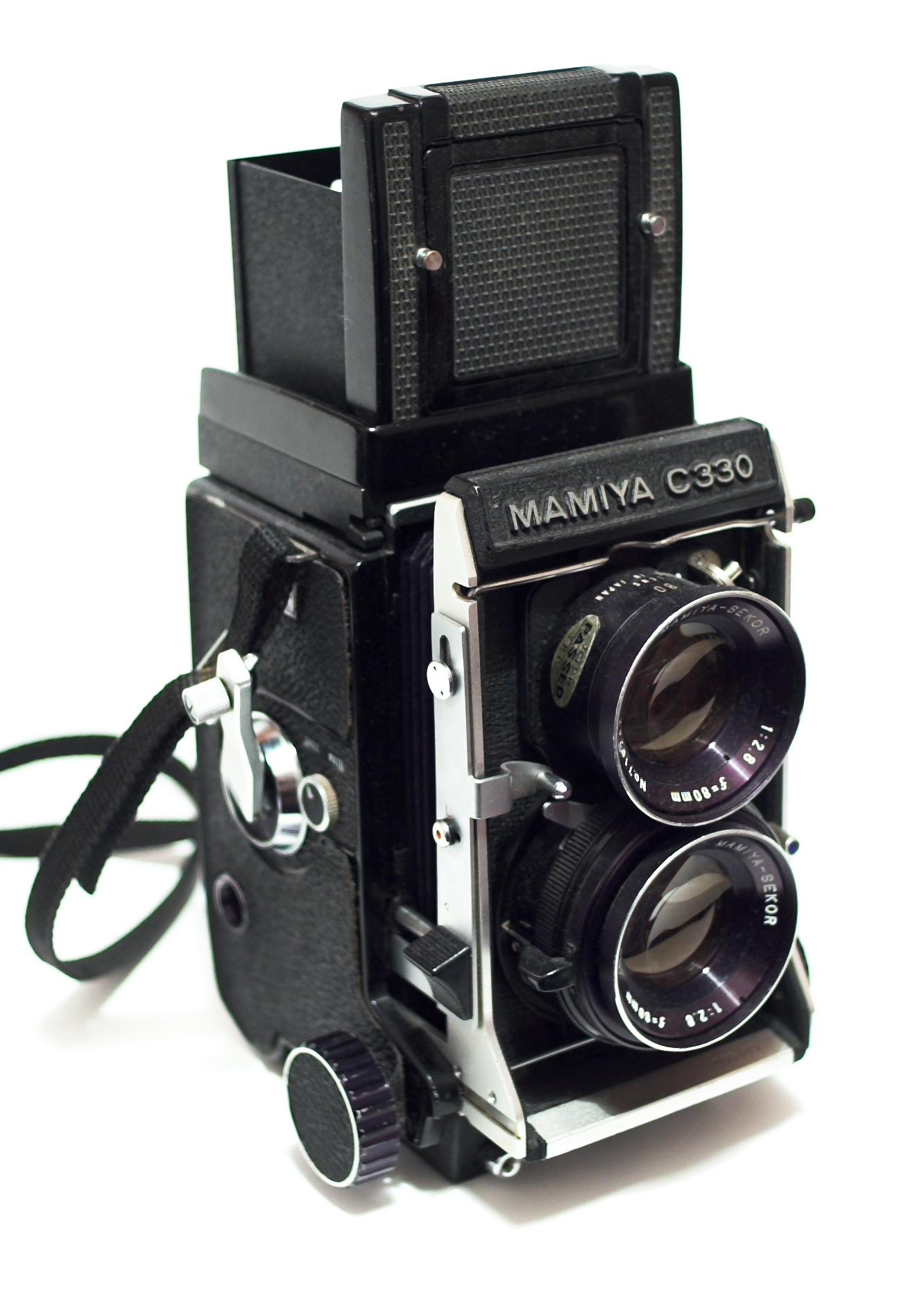
Mamiya C330

While the basic shape remained the same, the bodies increased with size over time. Two of the early models were branded with "Mamiyaflex" on the nameplate attached to the viewfinder; all of the other C series cameras were branded with "Mamiya". The first in the C series, the Mamiyaflex C, was introduced in 1957 as a follow-on to the earlier Mamiyaflex line, which had included the Automat A (1949) and Automat B (1954); the primary innovation of the C was the introduction of an interchangeable lens mount. The Mamiyaflex C was accompanied with 80mm, 105mm, and 135mm lenses. The C2 was introduced in June 1958 and is distinguished from its predecessor with a second focusing knob on the left side of the camera. In addition, two more lenses (65mm, 180mm) joined the line.

The "Mamiyaflex" name was dropped for "Mamiya" when the C3 was introduced in February 1962; the C3 featured updated styling, adding the name above the lens mount and switching to a gray leather body covering. At this time, the lenses used a new shutter mechanism with a faster minimum speed. The C3 also moved to a crank for film advance, speeding up camera operation.

The line was split in the mid-1960s with the C33 (April 1965) and C22 (March 1966) models. C22 had fewer features, which also made it lighter than the C33. The main distinguishing feature was the C33 had more automated operation, where winding the film also cocked the shutter automatically; the C22 required two separate actions. Both were the first Mamiya C TLRs that were able to use 220 film, but a different back was required.

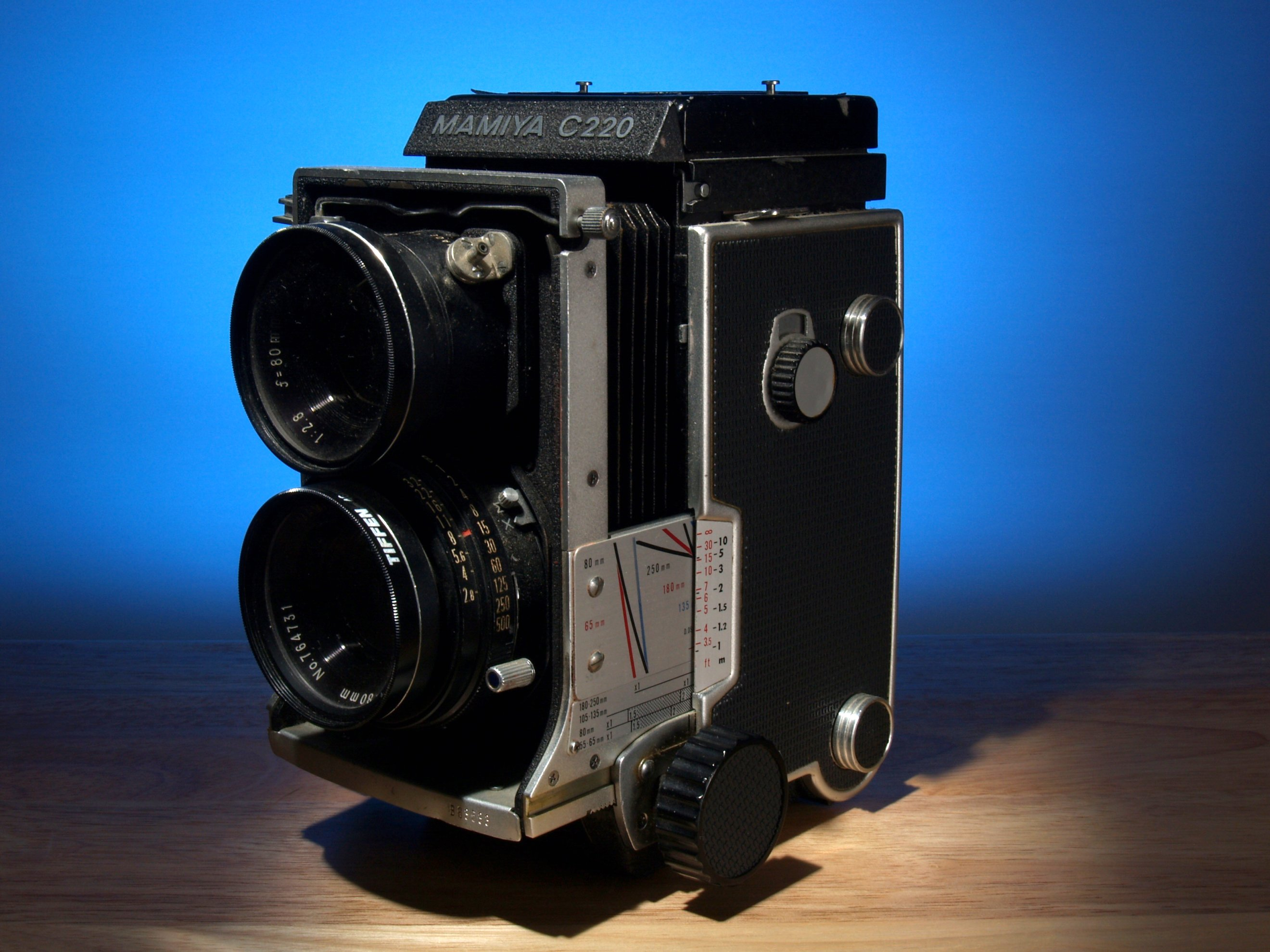
Mamiya C220

The C220 (April 1968) and C330 (October 1969) models were developed from the C22 and C33, respectively, with updated styling (the prominent nameplate now had chrome lettering on black) and a built-in switchable pressure plate to enable the use of 220 film. Weight was reduced as well. The final two lenses (55mm and 250mm) also were introduced at about this time.

The later C330f, C220f, and C330S were refined versions of their respective base cameras, and carried the letter annotation on a nameplate below the lens mount. One of the changes from the C330 to the C330f, for example, was the inclusion of a focusing track lock on the latter.

Mamiya C twin-lens reflex cameras
Name	Intro.	Film		Winder	Shutter cocking	Dimensions		Ref.
Name	Intro.	120	220	Winder	Shutter cocking	Size (W×H×D)	Weight	Ref.
C (Note: Branded "Mamiyaflex")	1956	Yes	No	knob	manual	114 mm x 164 mm x 103 mm	1,540 g	
PF (Note: police model)	1957	?	?	knob?	manual?	?	?	
C2	1958	Yes	No	knob	manual	?	1,250 g 44 oz	
C3	1962	Yes	No	crank	manual	93 mm × 159 mm × 108 mm 3 21/32 in × 6 1/4 in × 4 1/4 in	1,829 g; 65 oz 4 1/32 lb	
C33	1965	Yes	(Note: Camera can use 220 film with an optional accessory back.)	crank	automatic	?	1,810 g 64 oz	
C22	1966	Yes	No	knob (Note: Optional accessory crank available.)	manual	?	1,480 g 52 oz	
C220	1968	Yes	Yes	knob (Note: Equipped with fold-out crank.)	manual	118 mm × 167 mm × 113 mm 4.6 in × 6.6 in × 4.4 in	1,150 g 41 oz	
C330	1969	Yes	Yes	crank	automatic	?	1,465 g 52 oz	
C330f	1975	Yes	Yes	crank	automatic	122 mm × 168 mm × 114 mm 4.8 in × 6.6 in × 4.5 in	1,390 g 49 oz	
C220f	1982	Yes	Yes	knob	manual	123 mm × 172 mm × 113 mm 4.8 in × 6.8 in × 4.4 in	1,150 g 41 oz	
C330s	1983	Yes	Yes	crank	automatic	123 mm × 171 mm × 113 mm 4.8 in × 6.7 in × 4.4 in	1,340 g 47 oz	

== Lenses ==
Lenses for the Mamiya C series have been grouped by users into three different series based on the shutter model and the color of the shutter housing: first chrome, second chrome, and black. Most lenses can be used on most bodies, but some combinations won't allow for automatic shutter cocking. The first chrome series had Seikosha-MX shutters with speeds from 1 s to 1/400 s. The second chrome series had Seikosha-S shutters with speeds from 1 s to 1/500 s, plus Bulb. A few chrome shutter lens had a Seikosha-SLV shutter. The black series had Seiko shutters, except for the 80 mm f/3.7 lens, which had a Copal shutter.

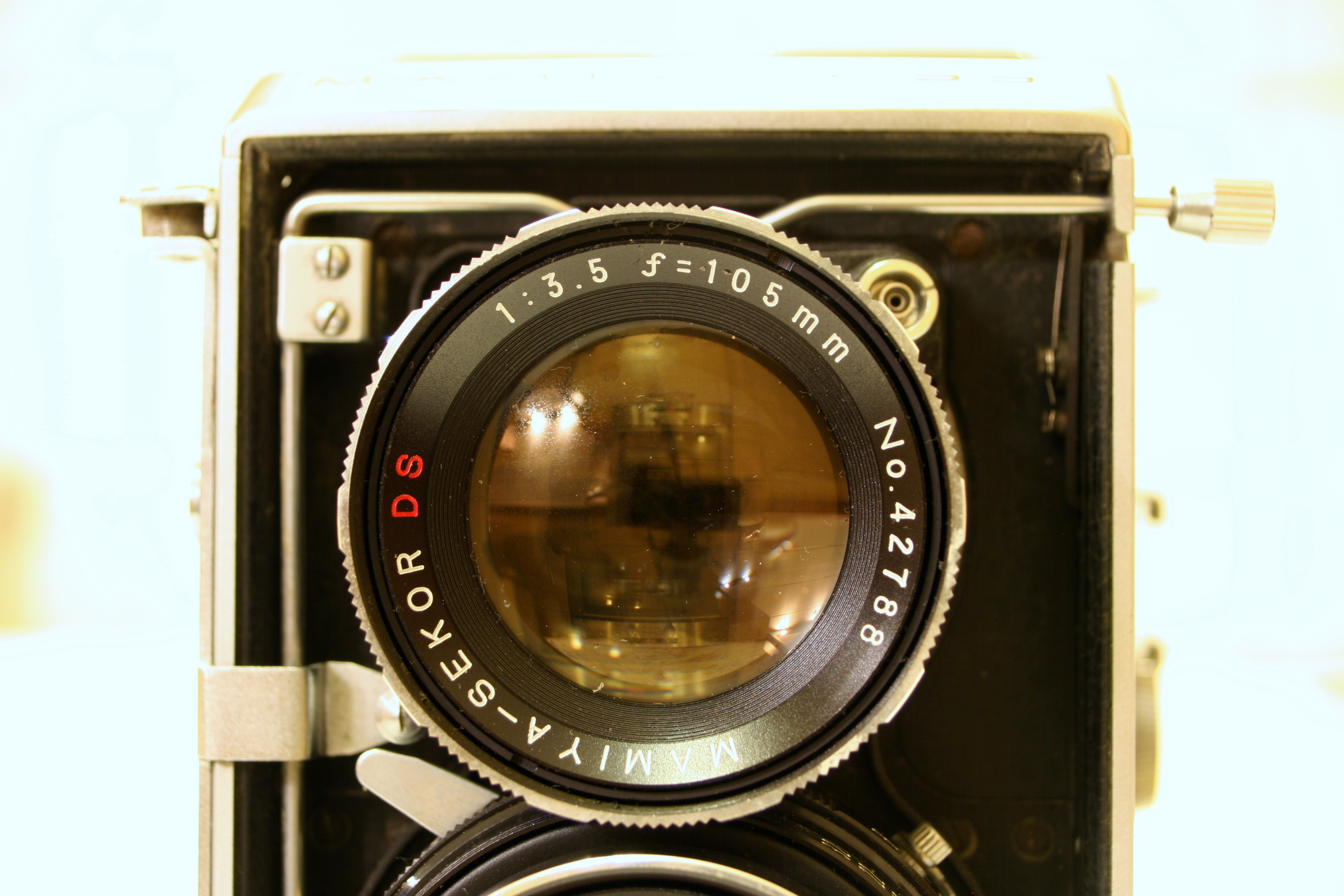
Top lens of 105 mm unit with lens retainer clip above

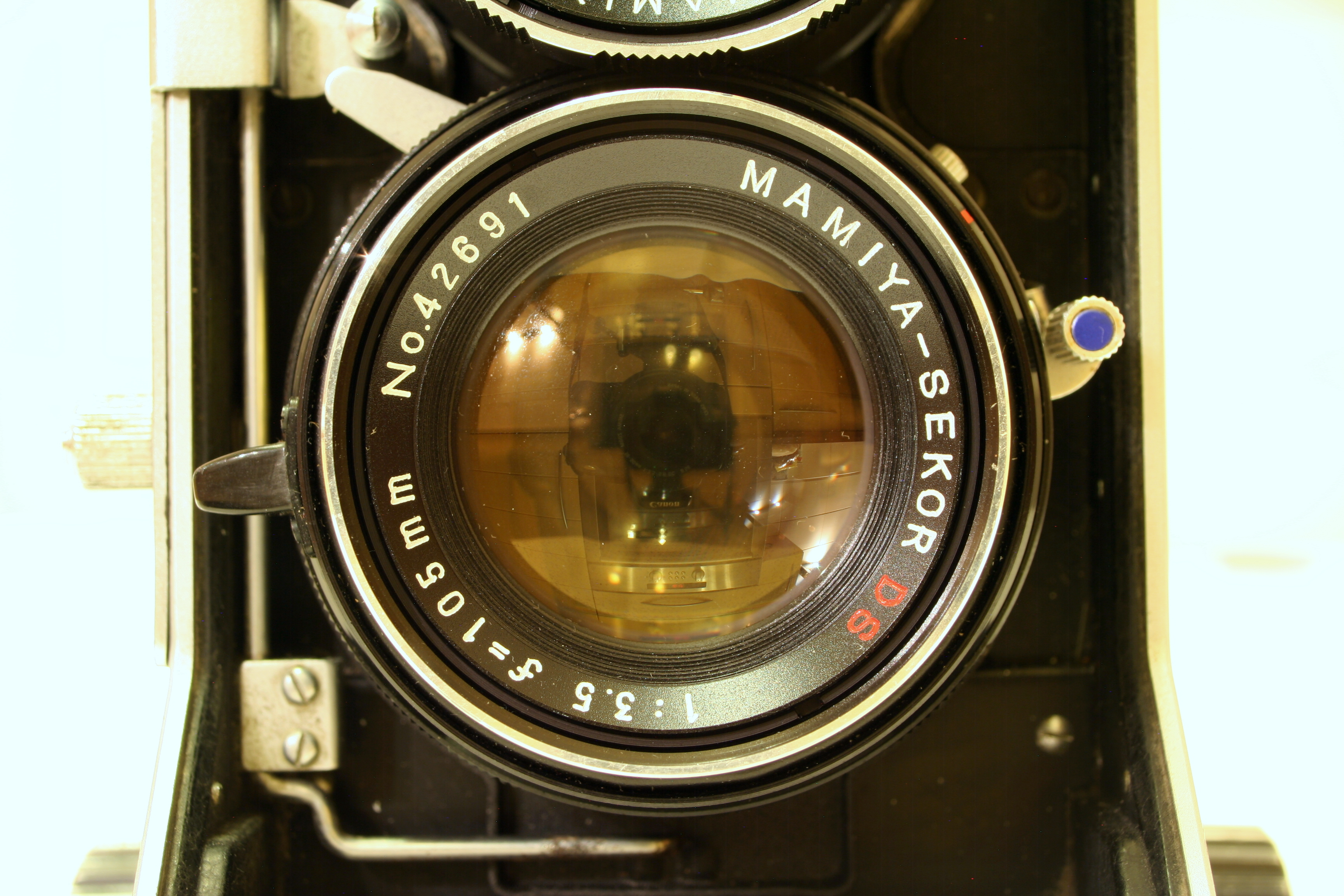
Bottom lens of 105 mm unit

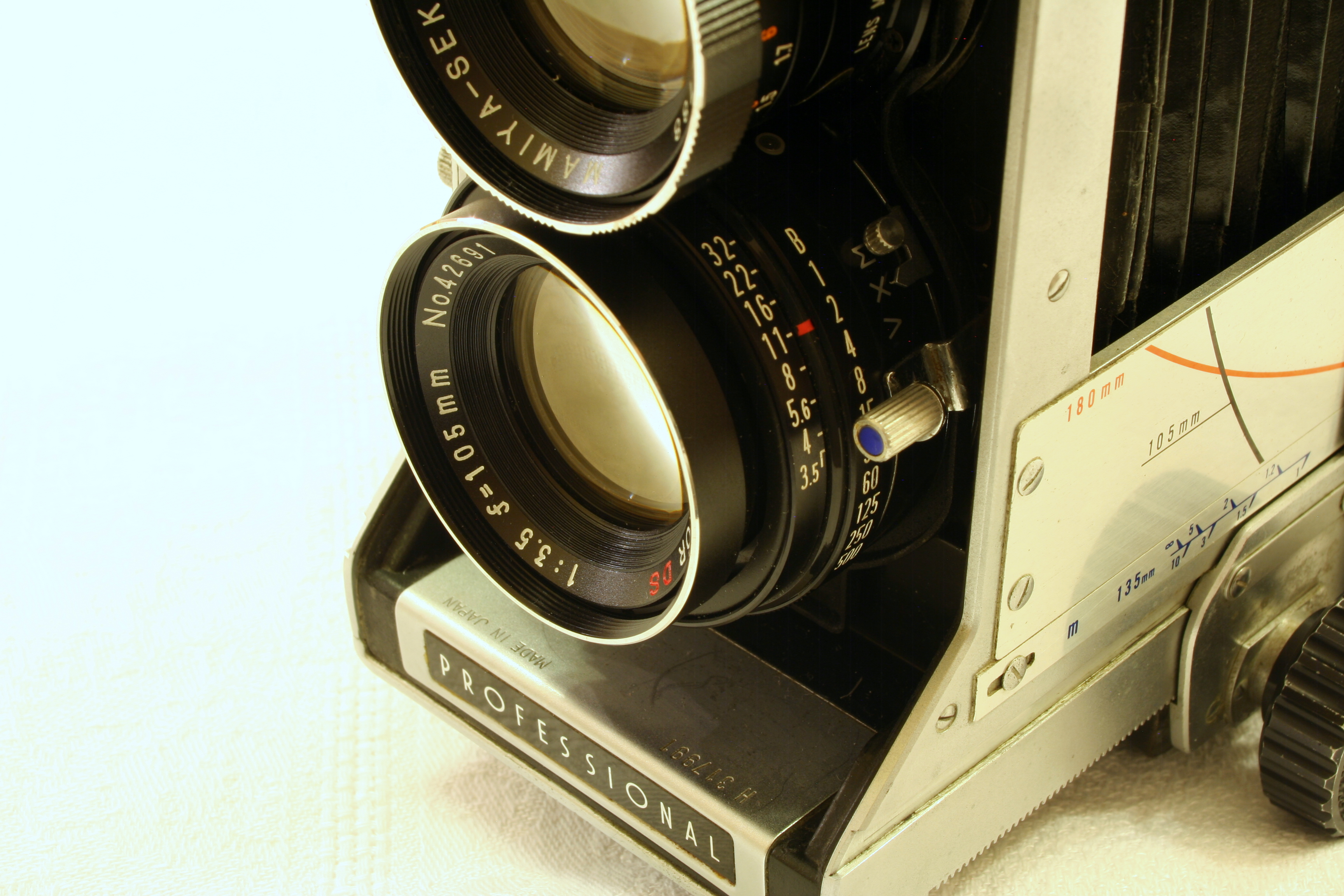
Bottom lens of 105 mm unit with aperture and shutter speed controls

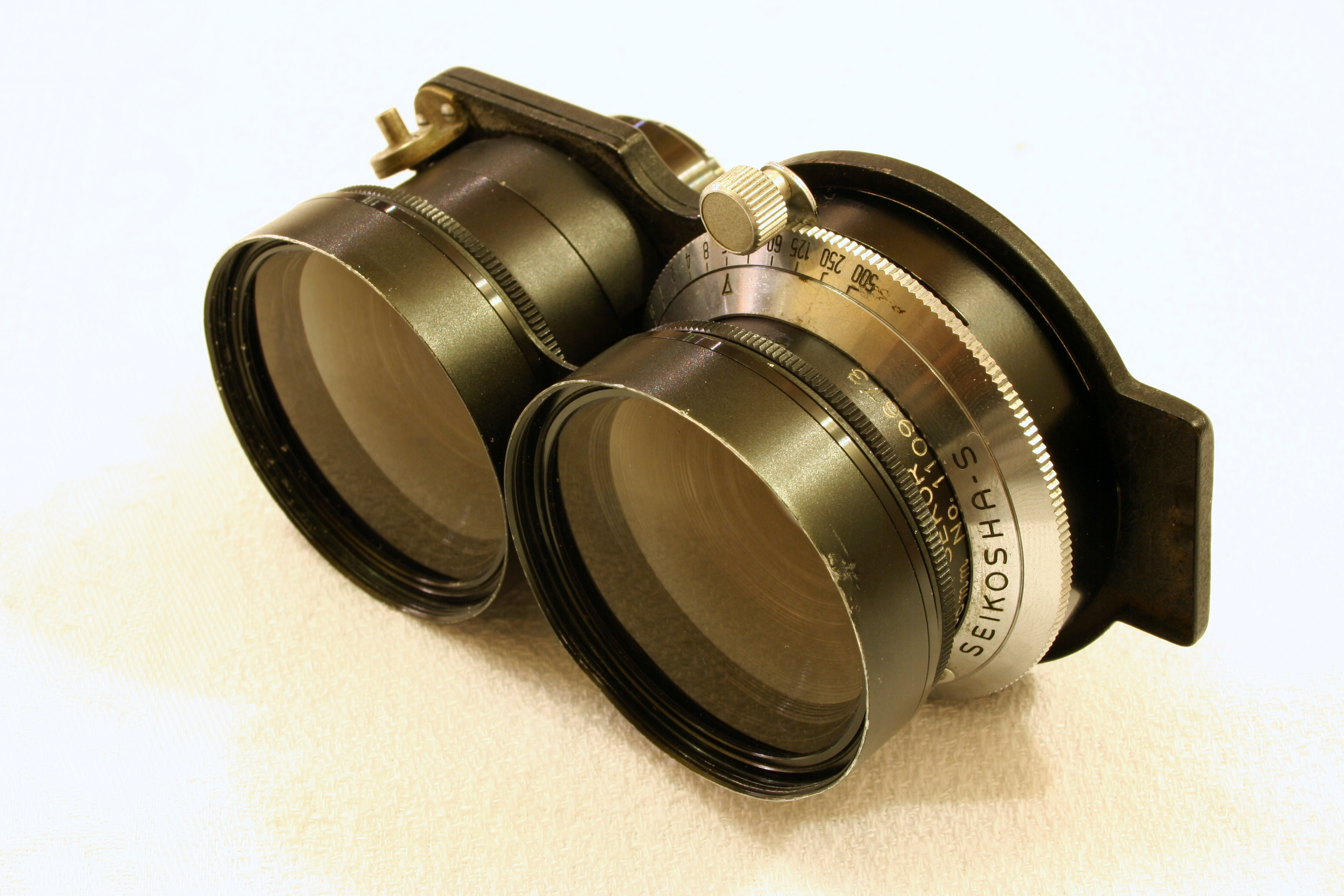
Mamiya C lens unit removed

Mamiya-Sekor lenses for Mamiya C TLR
Focal length	Aperture	Chrome		Black	Optics				Filter dia.	Weight
Focal length	Aperture	1st (Seikosha-MX) (Note: Shutter speeds range from 1 to 1/400 sec. Relatively short sales period: Dec 1956–Mar 1959. Can be mounted on C33 and later auto-cocking bodies, but will interfere with auto-cocking mechanism.)	2nd (Seikosha-S) (Note: Shutter speeds range from 1 to 1/500 sec plus "B"ulb)	Seiko	Comp. (Note: Optical composition, Elements/Groups)	Angle (Note: Measured diagonally)	Min. focus (Note: Varies according to specific camera model. Values stated are for Mamiya C330.)	Subject coverage (Note: At minimum focus, per side)	Filter dia.	Weight
55mm	f/4.5–22	No	No	Yes	9e/7g	70°30′	9 1/2 in 24 cm	2 17/32 in 6.4 cm	46mm	330 g 11.6 oz
65mm	f/3.5–32	Yes	Yes	Yes	6e/5g	63°	10 11/16 in 27.1 cm	2 21/32 in 6.7 cm	49mm (Note: The lenses equipped with 49mm filter threads were originally equipped with stiffening rings to protect the threads. These rings must be removed before placing a filter and are easily lost.)	340 g 12.0 oz
80mm	f/2.8–32	Yes	Yes	No	5e/3g	50°40′	1 ft 1 5/16 in 33.8 cm	3 25/64 in 8.6 cm	40.5mm	?
80mm	f/2.8–32	No	No	(Note: Also available as "S" version. The viewing lens on the "S" version is different than the taking lens.)	5e/3g	50°40′	1 ft 1 5/16 in 33.8 cm	3 25/64 in 8.6 cm	46mm	310 g 10.9 oz
80mm	f/3.7–32 (Note: Rare "budget" lens.)	No	(Note: Seikosha-SLV shutter)	(Note: Copal shutter with equivalent speeds.)	4e/3g	50°40′	1 ft 1 5/16 in 33.8 cm	3 25/64 in 8.6 cm	40.5mm	?
105mm	f/3.5–32	Yes	Yes	Yes	4e/3g	41°20′	1 ft 11 in 58 cm	7 1/4 in 18 cm	40.5mm	?
105mm	f/3.5–32	No	No	(Note: "D" and "DS" versions, as marked on the lens. "DS" version includes a diaphragm for the viewing lens to preview depth of field.)	5e/3g	41°20′	1 ft 11 in 58 cm	7 1/4 in 18 cm	46mm	336 g 11.9 oz
135mm	f/4.5–45	Yes	Yes	Yes	4e/3g (Note: Stated as 3e/3g in an early manual for the Mamiyaflex C2.)	33°	2 ft 11 1/2 in 90.2 cm	9 15/16 in 25.2 cm	46mm	370 g 13.1 oz
180mm	f/4.5–45	Yes	Yes	Yes	4e/3g	24°30′	4 ft 2 3/4 in 128.9 cm	10 53/64 in 27.5 cm	49mm	?
180mm	f/4.5–45	No	No	(Note: "Super" version with Seiko or Seiko-SLV shutter.)	5e/4g	24°30′	4 ft 2 3/4 in 128.9 cm	10 53/64 in 27.5 cm	49mm	620 g 21.9 oz
250mm	f/6.3–64	No	No	(Note: Requires manual cocking on all bodies)	6e/4g	18°	6 ft 8 3/4 in 205.1 cm	1 ft 1/4 in 31.1 cm	49mm	630 g 22.2 oz

== Accessories ==
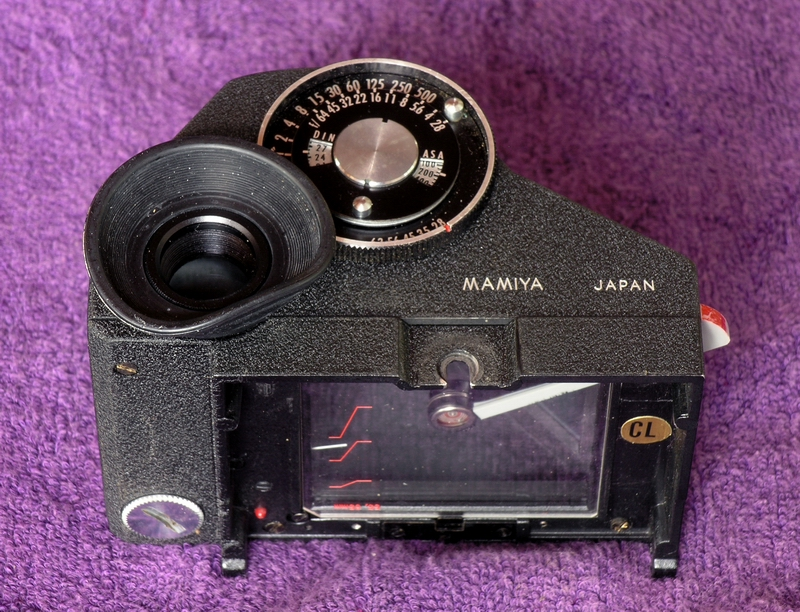
CdS Porrofinder - optional eye-level viewfinder with built-in meter

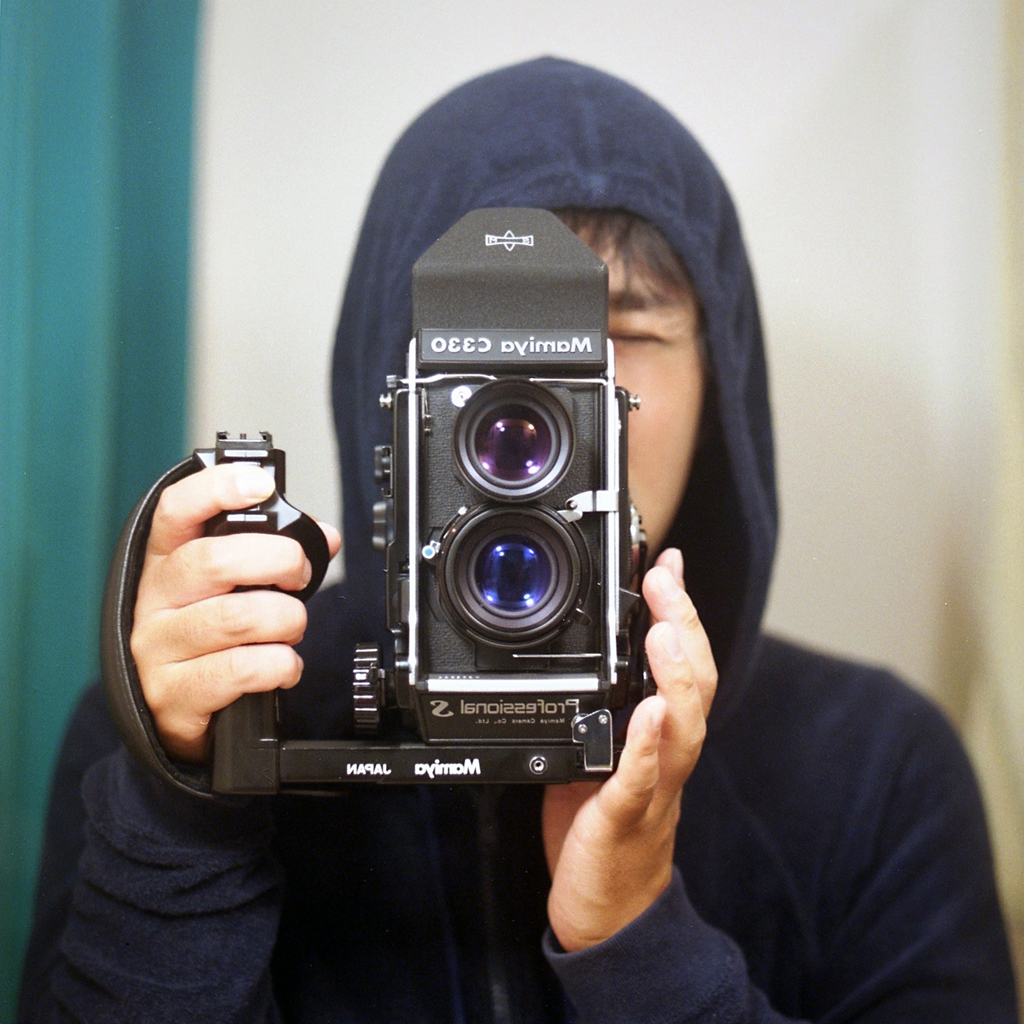
C330S with 80mm "S" lens, optional grip, and prism (eye-level) finder.

The Mamiya C series were marketed as system cameras, and over time a wide array of accessories were offered. Not all accessories are fully compatible with all camera bodies.

- Viewfinders - Magnifying hood, CdS finder, Porrofinder, CdS Porrofinder, Prism finder
- Viewfinder masks - for 105 mm, 136 mm, 180 mm, and 250 mm lenses
- Focusing screens - matte, crosshair, checker, rangefinder spot, microprism
- Pistol grips - bottom-mounted
- Grips - side-mounted
- Flashgun bracket
- Flashgun Pro Deluxe II
- Paramender - special tripod mount that helps with parallax issues
- Single-exposure back - for cut film and plates; three different models over time
- Lens hoods, cases, tripod quick releases, etc.

== See also ==
- List of Mamiya products
