= Mamiya Six =

Film camera

The Mamiya Six, also known as the Mamiya-6, is a series of folding medium-format rangefinder cameras manufactured by Mamiya between 1940 and the late 1950s. The cameras captured twelve 6 cm × 6 cm images on 120 film rolls. Some later models could also take sixteen 4.5 cm × 6 cm images. The cameras were coupled rangefinders, but had a unique focusing mechanism that moved the film plane instead of the lens. The lenses were not interchangeable and were made by various Japanese manufacturers. Beginning with the model IV, the name on the top plate changed from "Mamiya Six" (two lines) to "Mamiya-6".

== Models ==
- Mamiya Six I (1940)
- Mamiya Six I A (1941)
- Mamiya Six III (1942)
- Mamiya Six II (1943)
- Mamiya Six II A (1943)
- Mamiya-6 IV (1947)
- Mamiya-6 V (1953)
- Mamiya-6 K (1954)
- Mamiya-6 IV B (1955)
- Mamiya-6 Automat (1955)
- Mamiya-6 K II (1956)
- Mamiya-6 IV S (1957)
- Mamiya-6 P (1957)
- Mamiya-6 Automat 2 (1958)

== See also ==
- List of Mamiya products
