= Mamiya 7 =

Medium-format rangefinder system camera

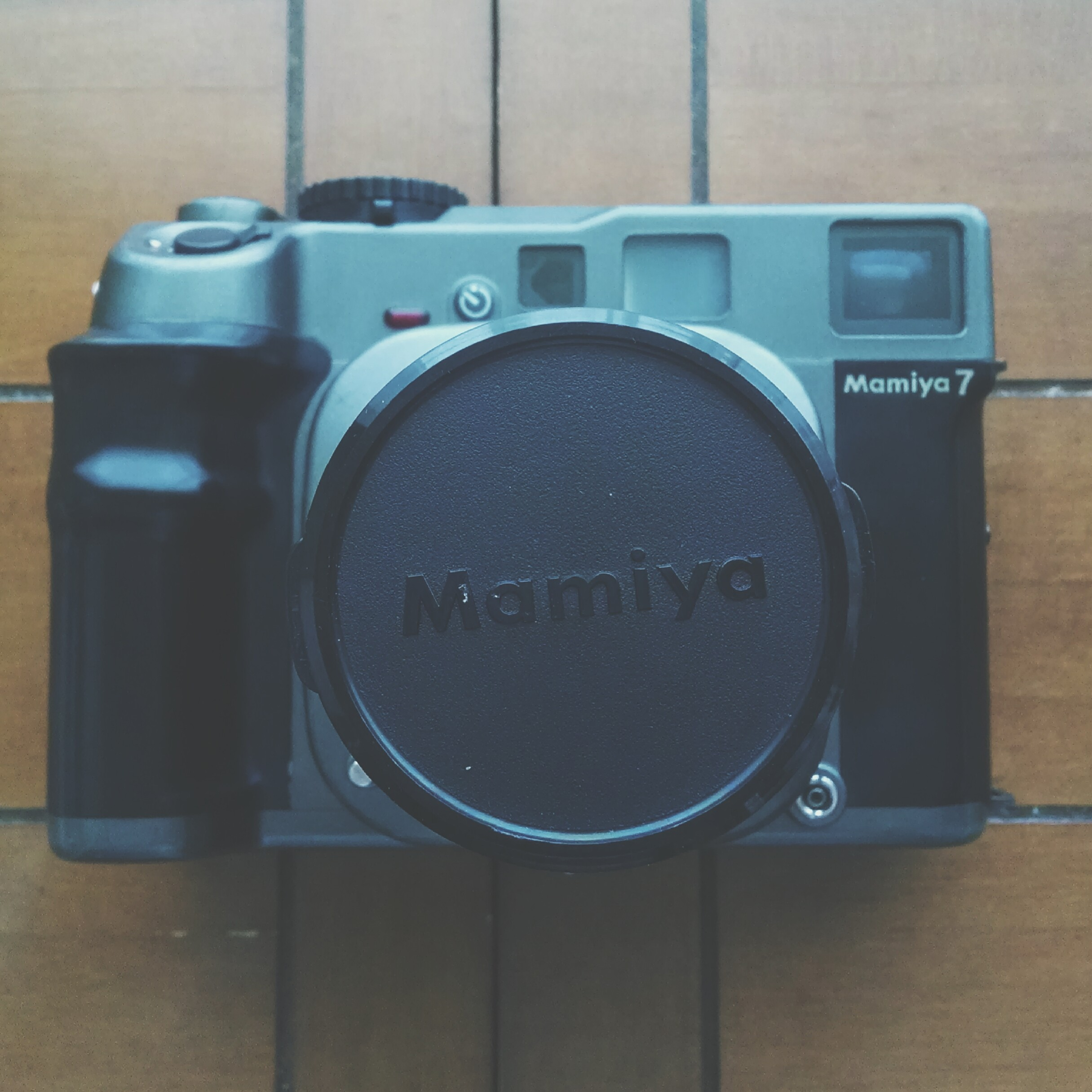

The Mamiya 7 is a medium-format rangefinder system camera manufactured by Mamiya. It was introduced in 1995 and discontinued in 2014.

== Features ==
The Mamiya 7 has a coupled viewfinder window which displays frame lines appropriate to the lens mounted, but only for the 65 mm, 80 mm, and 150 mm lenses. The 43 mm, 50 mm, and 210 mm lenses require an external viewfinder to be inserted into the hot shoe for composition. The camera has a built-in dark slide that allows the manual-focusing electronic leaf shutter lenses to be changed with film in the camera. It can operate in auto exposure, auto exposure lock, and manual modes. It captures ten 6 cm × 7 cm images on 120 film rolls, and 20 on 220 film. The camera also features a self-timer, hot shoe, and flash synchronization terminal. An optional panoramic adapter allows 24×65 mm images to be captured on 35 mm film.

The Mamiya 7II was introduced in 1999. It features an improved viewfinder and multi-exposure capability.

== Lenses ==
- Mamiya 43 mm f/4.5
  - Requires external viewfinder FV701
- Mamiya 50mm f/4.5
  - Requires external viewfinder FV703
- Mamiya 65 mm f/4.0
- Mamiya 80 mm f/4.0
- Mamiya 150 mm f/4.5
  - Optionally used with external viewfinder FV704
- Mamiya 210 mm f/8.0
  - Requires external viewfinder FV704
  - Does not couple to the camera's rangefinder. Focusing distance must be manually estimated.

== See also ==
- Mamiya 6
- List of Mamiya products
