= List of Mamiya products =

This is a list of products made by Mamiya, including cameras and lenses. Models made by Mamiya but marketed under other labels are shown in parentheses.

== Cameras ==
=== 16 mm format ===
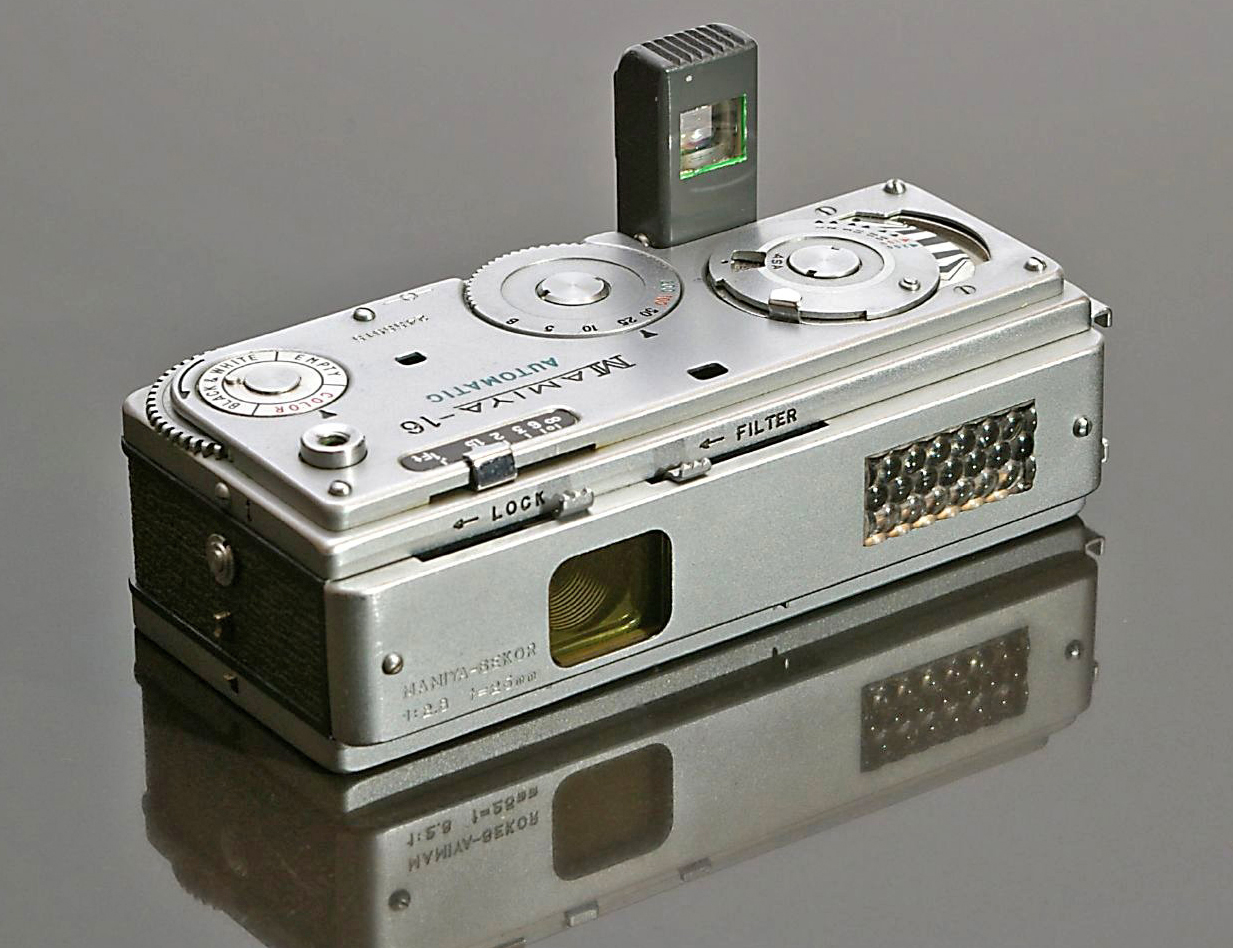
Mamiya 16 Automatic

- Mamiya 16 (1949)
- Mamiya Super 16 (1953)
- Mamiya Super 16 II (1957)
- Mamiya Super 16 III (Tower 16) (1958)
- Mamiya 16 Automatic (Revue 16 Automatic) (1959)
- Mamiya 16 Deluxe (1961)
- Mamiya 16 EE Deluxe (1962)

=== 126 format ===
- (Argus 260 Automatic) (1964)
- (Keystone K1020) (1966) — fixed-lens single lens reflex

=== 35 mm format ===
==== Rangefinder ====
- Mamiya 35 I (1949)
- Mamiya 35 II (1955)
- Mamiya 35 III (1957)
- Mamiya Magazine 35 (1957)
- Mamiya Wide (1957)
- Mamiya Elca (1958)
- Mamiya Crown (1958)
- Mamiya Metra (1958)
- Mamiya S (1958)
- Mamiya Wide E (1959)
- Mamiya Auto Metra (1959)
- Mamiya Metra 2 (1959)
- Mamiya Auto Metra 2 (1959)
- Mamiya Sketch (1959) — square image format (24mm × 24mm)
- Mamiya S2 (1959)
- Mamiya Ruby (1959)
- Mamiya Auto Deluxe (1960)
- Mamiya Ruby Standard (1961)
- Mamiya M3 (1961)
- Mamiya EE Super Merit (Mamiya Vulcan, Honeywell Electric Eye 35R, Mansfield Eye-Tronic R) (1962)
- Mamiya 4B (Rank Mamiya) (1963)
- Mamiya Super Deluxe (1964)
- Mamiya Myrapid (1965) — half-frame
- Mamiya 135 (1977)

==== Single lens reflex ====
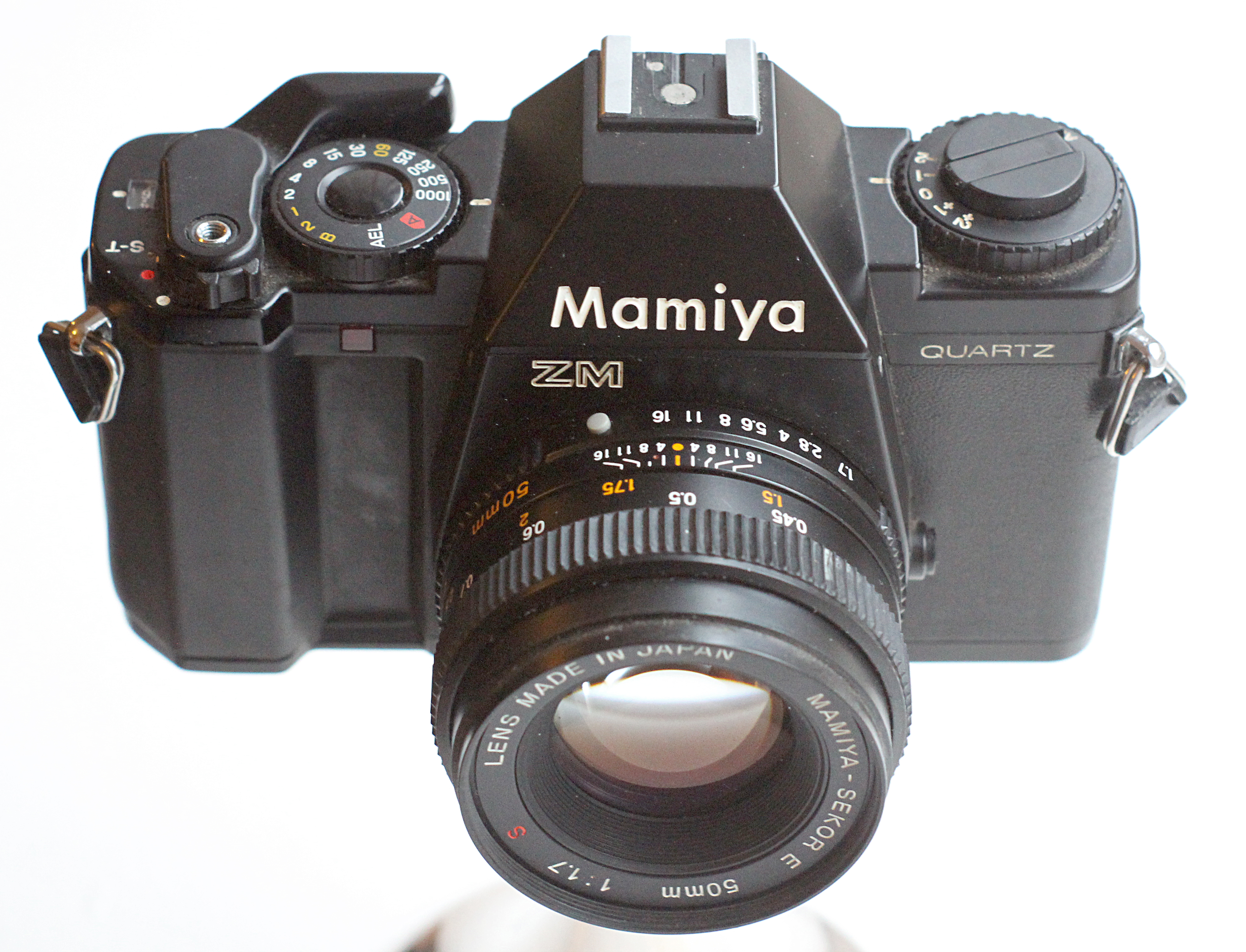
Mamiya ZM

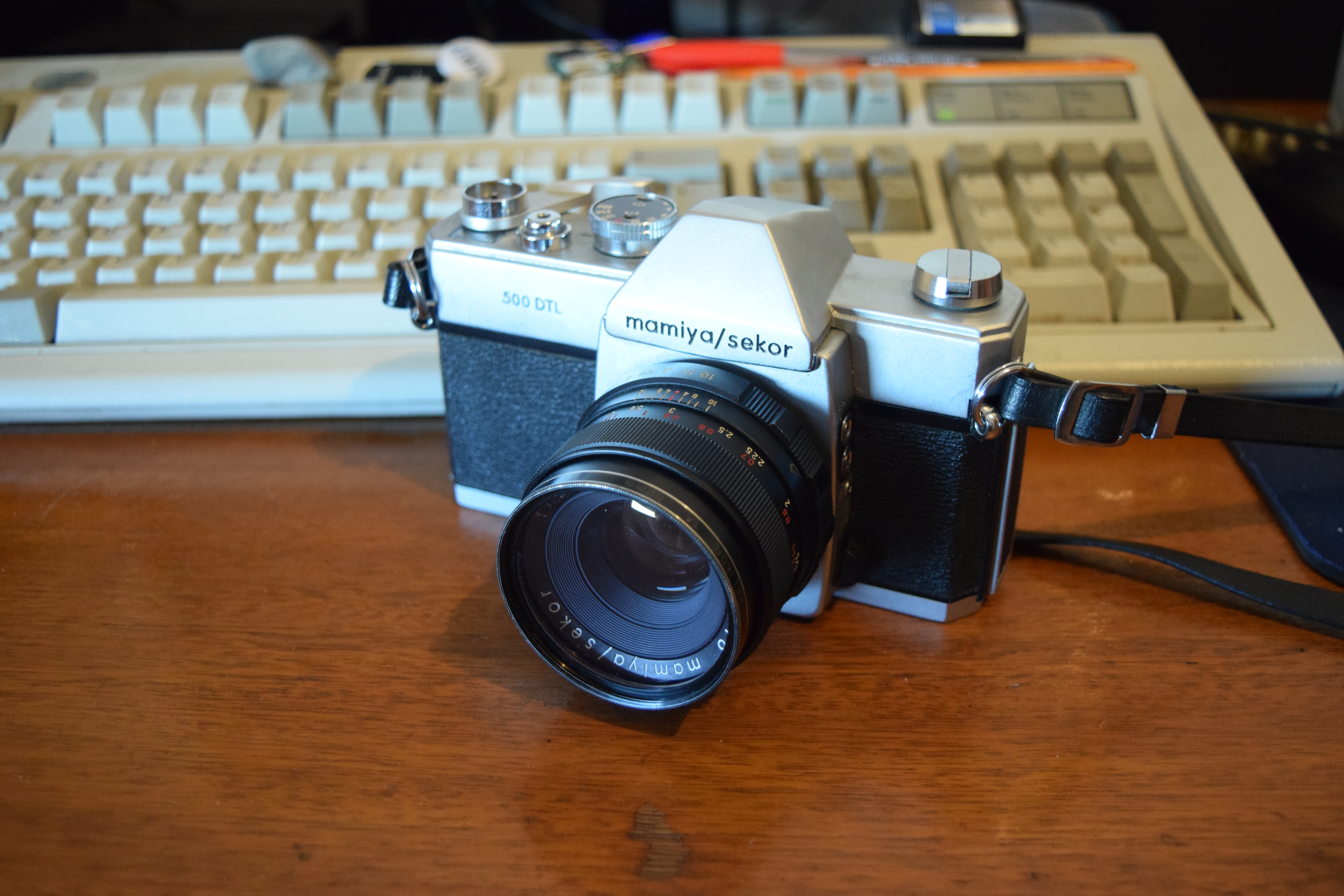
Mamiya/Sekor 500DTL

- Mamiya Prismflex (c. 1952) — prototype
- Mamiya Pentaflex (c. 1955) — prototype
- Mamiya Prismat (1960) — Exakta bayonet mount
- Mamiya Prismat NP (Sears 32A, Tower 32B, Sears 32B) (1961) — Exakta bayonet mount
- Mamiya Prismat PH (Tower 37, Tower 37A, PCA V-90) (1961) — Exakta bayonet mount
- Mamiya Prismat WP (1962) Argus Bayonet mount
- Mamiya Prismat WT (1962) Argus Bayonet mount
- (Nikkorex F, Ricoh Singlex, Nikkor J) (1962) — Nikon F-mount
- Mamiya Prismat CPH (1963) — Exakta bayonet mount
- Mamiya Prismat CWP (Mamiya Prismat CP) (1964) — Exakta bayonet mount
- Mamiya/Sekor 500TL (1966) — M42 lens mount
- Mamiya/Sekor 1000TL (1966) — M42 lens mount
- Mamiya/Sekor 500DTL (1968) — M42 lens mount
- Mamiya/Sekor 1000DTL (1968) — M42 lens mount
- Mamiya/Sekor 2000DTL (1969) — M42 lens mount
- Mamiya/Sekor AutoXTL (1972) — Mamiya XTL bayonet mount
- Mamiya X-1000 (1974) — Mamiya XTL bayonet mount
- Mamiya MSX 500 (1974) — M42 lens mount
- Mamiya MSX 1000 (1975) — M42 lens mount
- Mamiya DSX 500 (1975) — M42 lens mount
- Mamiya DSX 1000 B (1975) — M42 lens mount
- Mamiya NC-1000 (1978) — Mamiya NC bayonet mount
- Mamiya NC-1000s (1978) — Mamiya NC bayonet mount
- Mamiya ZE (1980) — Mamiya Z bayonet mount
- Mamiya ZE-2 (1980) — Mamiya Z bayonet mount
- Mamiya ZE-X (1981) — Mamiya Z bayonet mount
- Mamiya ZM (1982) — Mamiya Z bayonet mount
- Mamiya ZF (c. 1983) — prototype

==== Fixed-lens SLR ====
- Mamiya Auto-Lux 35 (1961)
- Mamiya Prismat Family (1962)
- Mamiya Prismat 528TL (1967)
- Mamiya Prismat 528AL (1975)

==== Viewfinder ====
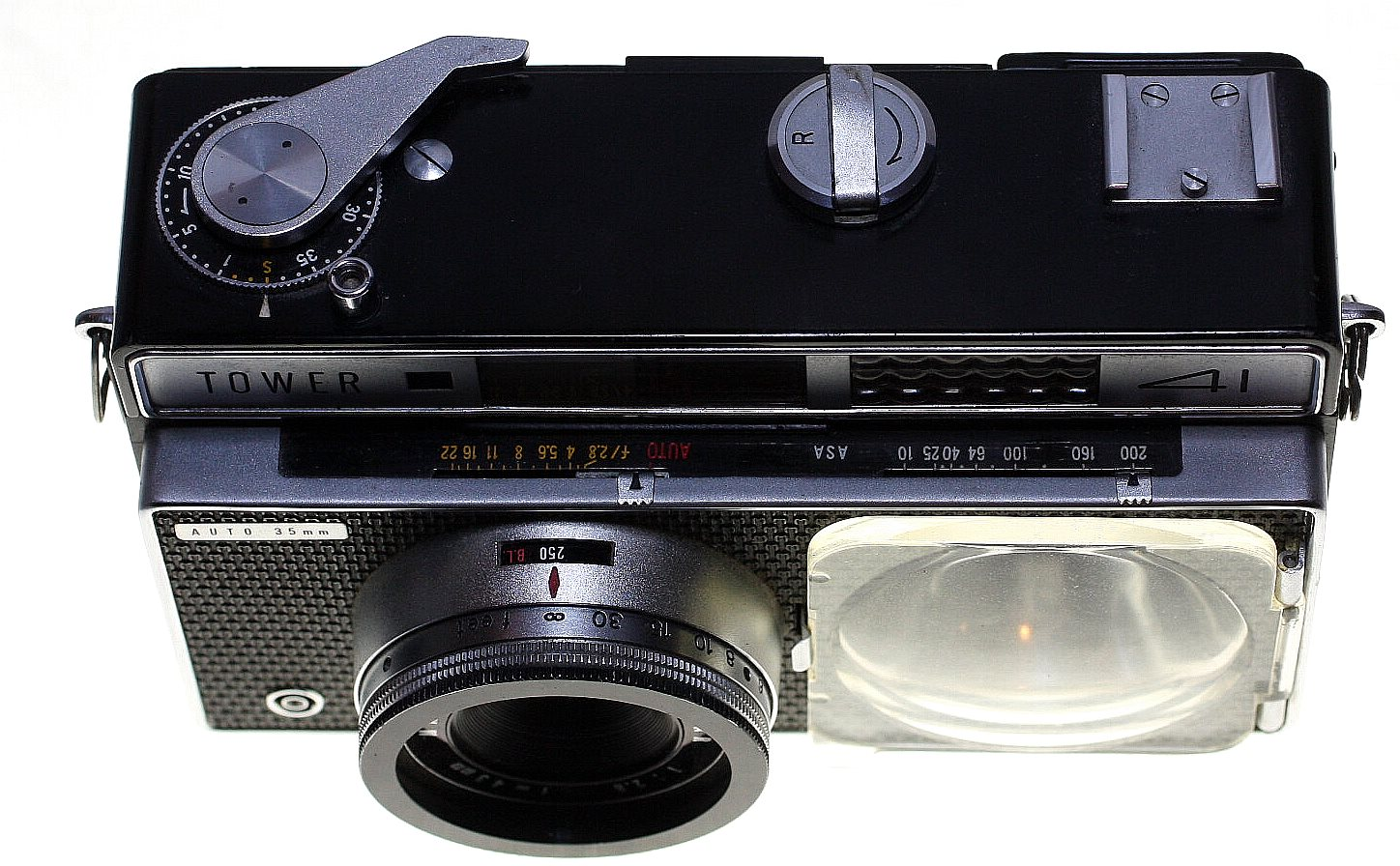
Tower 41 (Mamiya Automatic 35 EEF)

- Mamiya Mammy (1953) — zone focus system
- Mamiya Speed Shot Special (a.k.a. Mamiya Pistol Camera) (c. 1954) — half-frame; rare police model; not sold to public
- Mamiya Automatic 35 EEF (Tower 39, Tower 41) (1961) — zone focus system
- Mamiya EE Merit (Honeywell Electric Eye) (1962) — zone focus system
- Mamiya 135 EF (1979) — zone focus system
- Mamiya 135 AF (1980) — auto-focus
- Mamiya U (1981) — zone focus system
- Mamiya 135 EF2 (1982) — zone focus system
- Mamiya M (1982) — auto-focus
- Mamiya U Auto Focus (1983) — auto-focus
- Mamiya M Time Memory (1983) — auto-focus

=== 6×4.5 cm format ===
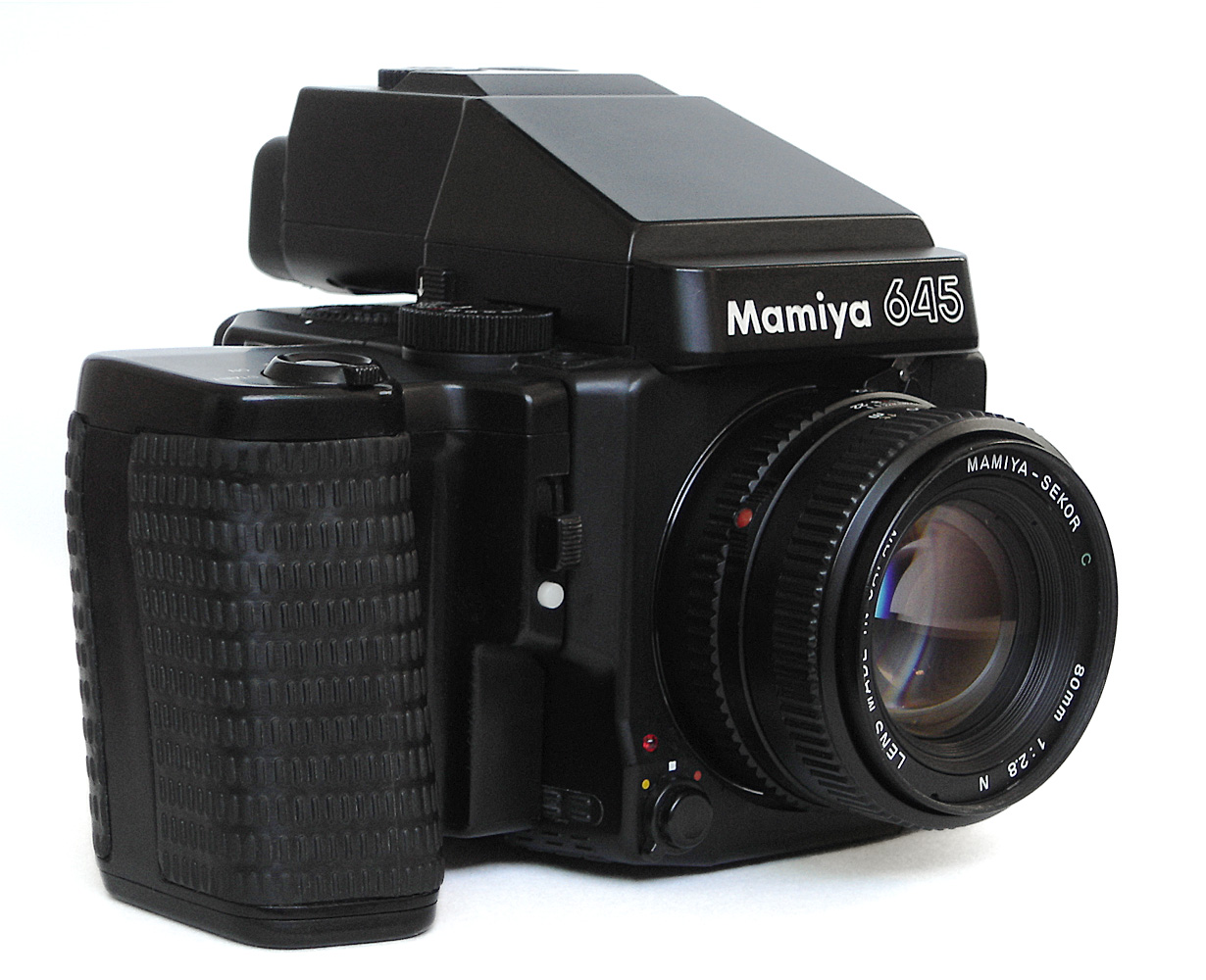
Mamiya 645 Super

For details, see Mamiya 645.

==== Mamiya 645 manual focus series ====
- The M645 (discontinued) was manufactured from 1975 to 1987 — the first model and the launch of the Mamiya 645 system
- The M645 1000S (discontinued) was manufactured from 1976 to 1990 — added a 1/1000 second shutter speed, self-timer and a depth-of-field preview lever
- The M645J (discontinued) was manufactured from 1979 to 1982 — a stripped down version of the M645
- The Mamiya 645 Super (discontinued) was manufactured from 1985 to 1993 — a new camera design with removable film backs
- The Mamiya 645 Pro (discontinued) was manufactured from 1993 to 1998 — minor updates to the Mamiya 645 Super
- The Mamiya 645 Pro-TL (discontinued) was first released in 1997 — minor updates to the Mamiya 645 Pro
- The Mamiya 645E (discontinued) was first released in 2000 — entry-level model with a non-interchangeable back and finder

==== Mamiya 645 auto focus series ====
- Mamiya 645AF (1999) — the first autofocus model
- Mamiya 645AFD (2001) — added communication interface for digital backs
- Mamiya 645AFD II (2005) — minor updates to the 645AFD
- Mamiya 645AFD III (Phase One 645AF) (2008) — minor updates to the 645AFD II
- Mamiya 645DF (Phase One 645DF) (2009) — digital-only (no film backs) supports Leaf shutter lenses, vertical grip and user firmware upgrades.
- Mamiya 645DF+ (Phase One 645DF+) (2012–current) — Faster auto focus compared to DF and automated live view handling with compatible digital backs.

==== Mamiya ZD series ====
- Mamiya ZD (2004) — fixed-back medium-format DSLR

=== 6×6 cm format ===
==== Twin-lens reflex ====
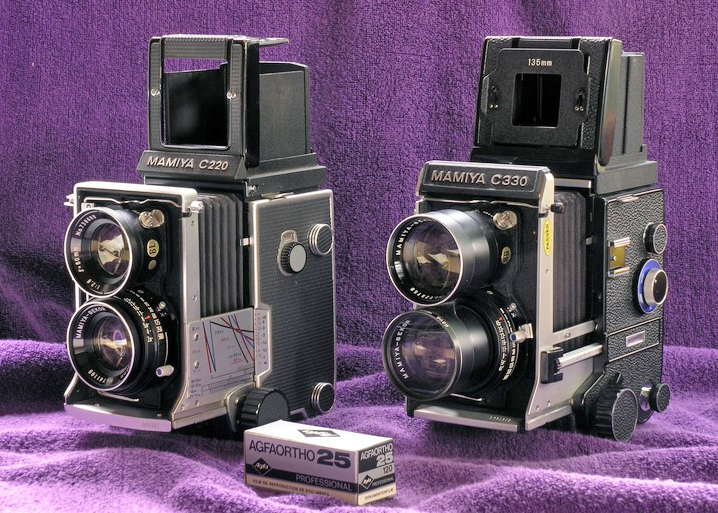
Mamiya C220 and C330

- Mamiyaflex Junior (1948)
- Mamiyaflex Automat A (1949)
- Mamiyaflex I (1951)
- Mamiyaflex II (1952)
- Mamiyaflex Automat B (1954)
- Mamiyaflex Automat A II (1955)
- Mamiyaflex Automat B II (1956)
- Mamiyaflex Automat A III (1956)
- Mamiyaflex C Professional (1956)
- Mamiyaflex PF (1957) police model
- Mamiyaflex C2 Professional (1958)
- Mamiya C3 Professional (1962)
- Mamiya C33 Professional (1965)
- Mamiya C22 Professional (1966)
- Mamiya C220 Professional (1968)
- Mamiya C330 Professional (1969)
- Mamiya C330f Professional (1975)
- Mamiya C220f Professional (1982)
- Mamiya C330s Professional (1983)

==== Rangefinder ====
- Mamiya Six I (1940)
- Mamiya Six I A (1941)
- Mamiya Six III (1942)
- Mamiya Six II (1943)
- Mamiya Six II A (1943)
- Mamiya-6 IV (1947)
- Mamiya-6 V (1953)
- Mamiya-6 K (1954)
- Mamiya-6 IV B (1955)
- Mamiya-6 Automat (1955)
- Mamiya-6 K II (1956)
- Mamiya-6 IV S (1957)
- Mamiya-6 P (1957)
- Mamiya-6 Automat 2 (1958)
- Mamiya 6 (1989) — electronic 6 cm × 6 rangefinder camera
- Mamiya 6 MF (1993) — added multi-format back feature

=== 6×7 cm format ===
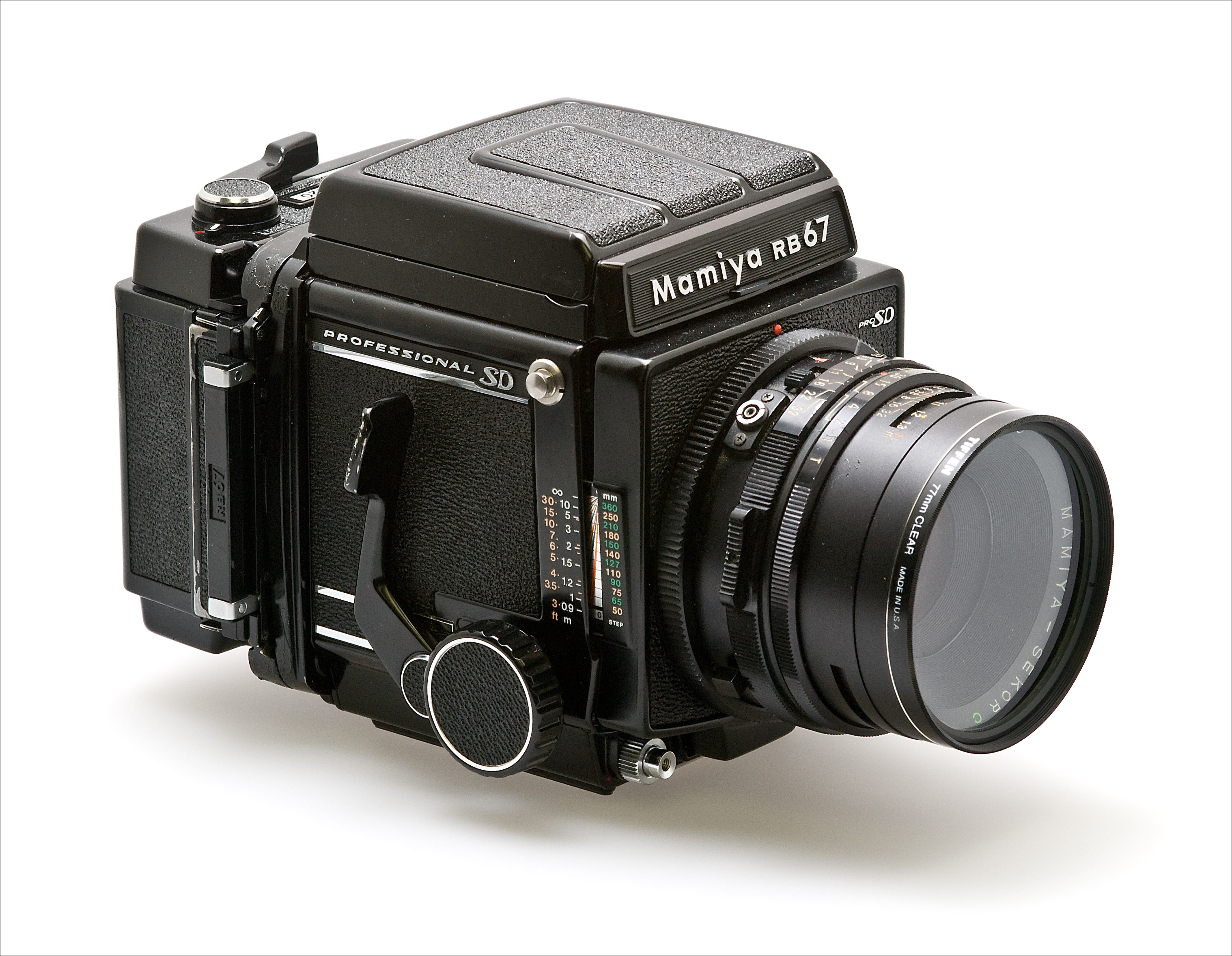
Mamiya RB67 Pro-SD

- Mamiya RB67 Professional (1970) — mechanical 6 cm × 7 cm SLR medium-format camera
- Mamiya RB67 Professional S (1974) — minor changes
- Mamiya RB67 Professional GL (1982) — special edition of the Pro-S
- Mamiya RB67 Professional SD (1990) — new, larger lens throat; older lenses require an adapter
- Mamiya RZ67 Professional (1982) — electronic 6 cm × 7 cm SLR medium-format camera
- Mamiya RZ67 Professional II (1995) — upgraded electronics
- Mamiya RZ67 Professional IID (2004–2014) — added communication interface for digital backs
- Mamiya 7 (1995–1999) — electronic 6 cm × 7 cm rangefinder camera
- Mamiya 7 II (1999–2011) — added multi-exposure capability and other minor improvements

=== 6x9 cm format ===
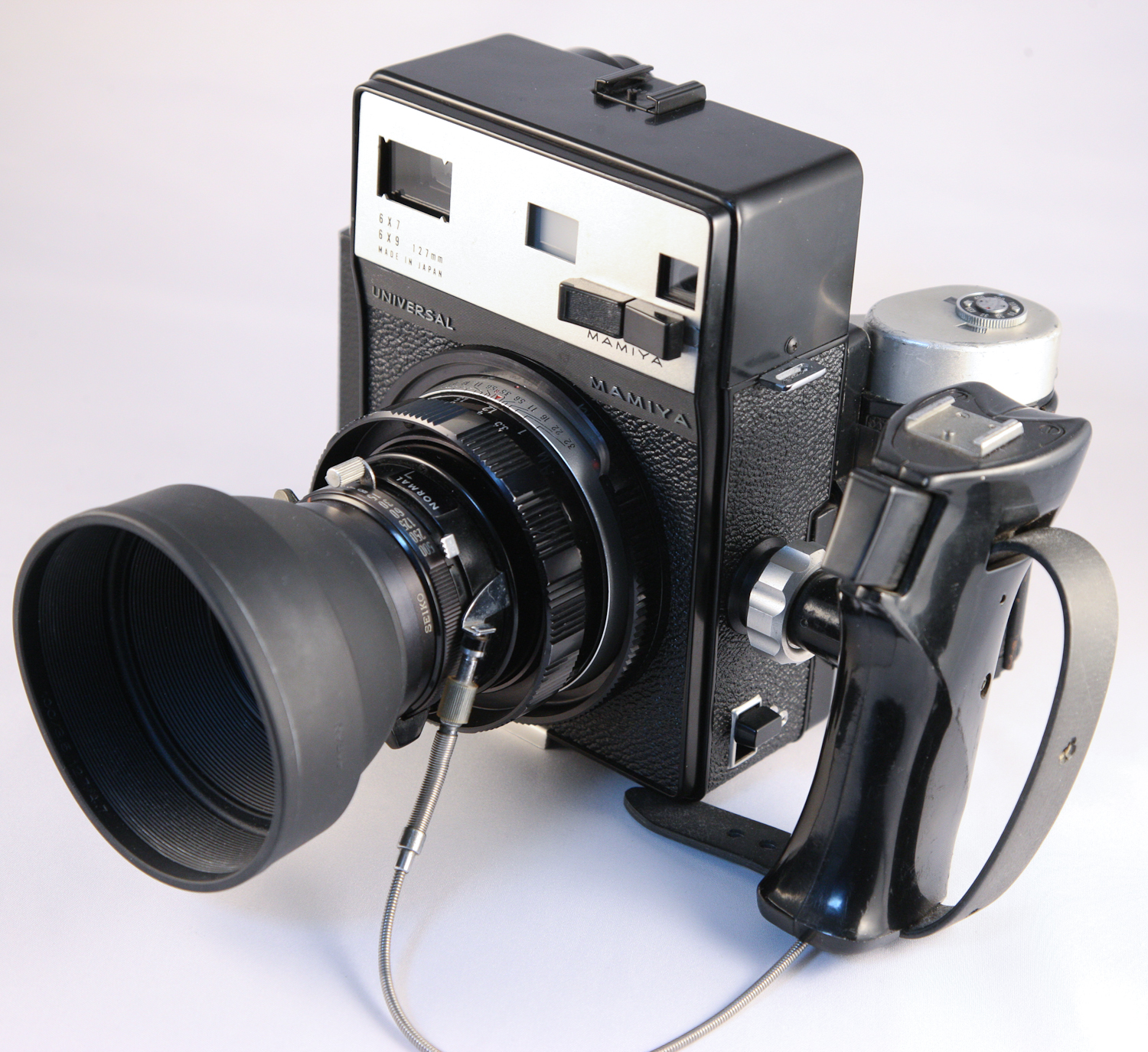
Mamiya Universal

- Mamiya Press (1960)
- Mamiya Press G (1963)
- Mamiya Press S (1964)
- Mamiya Press Standard (1965)
- Mamiya Press Super 23 (1967)
- Mamiya Universal Press (1969)
- (Polaroid 600/600SE) — similar to the Mamiya Universal, but with different lens and back mounts (note: not part of the 600 series consumer line)

== Lenses ==
=== Mamiya 645 lenses and accessories ===
- See the Mamiya 645 system article for a complete list of lenses and accessories

=== Mamiya RB lenses ===
Mamiya RB lenses come in original (single-coated), C (multi-coated), K/L (newer design multi-coated), L (newer design multi-coated, Pro-SD body only), and APO/L (low-dispersion glass, Pro-SD body only) versions.

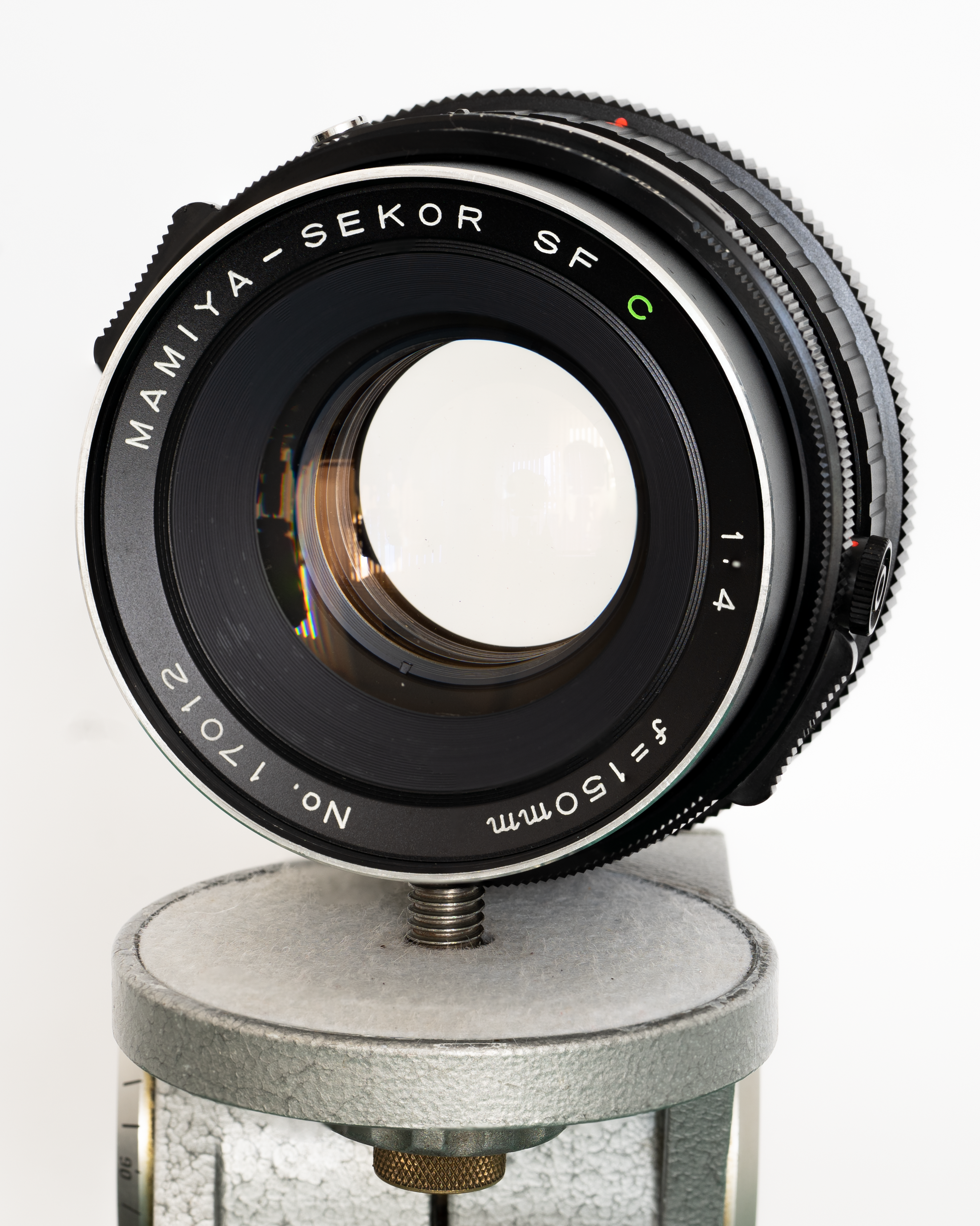
Mamiya-Sekor Soft Focus C 150mm 1:4 lens

- Mamiya 37 mm f/4.5 C Fisheye
- Mamiya 50 mm f/4.5
- Mamiya 50 mm f/4.5 C (current)
- Mamiya 65 mm f/4.5
- Mamiya 65 mm f/4.5 C
- Mamiya 65 mm f/4.0 K/L (current)
- Mamiya 75 mm f/4.5 K/L (current)
- Mamiya 75 mm f/3.5 S/L Shift
- Mamiya 90 mm f/3.8
- Mamiya 90 mm f/3.8 C
- Mamiya 90 mm f/3.5 K/L (current)
- Mamiya 127 mm f/3.8
- Mamiya 127 mm f/3.8 C
- Mamiya 127 mm f/3.5 K/L (current)
- Mamiya 140 mm f/4.6 C Macro (current)
- Mamiya 150 mm f/4.0 C Variable Soft Focus (current)
- Mamiya 150 mm f/3.5 K/L
- Mamiya 180 mm f/4.5
- Mamiya 180 mm f/4.5 C
- Mamiya 180 mm f/4.5 K/L (current)
- Mamiya 210 mm f/4.5 APO/L (current)
- Mamiya 250 mm f/4.5
- Mamiya 250 mm f/4.5 C
- Mamiya 250 mm f/4.5 K/L (current)
- Mamiya 250 mm f/4.5 APO/L (current)
- Mamiya 350 mm f/5.6 APO/L (current)
- Mamiya 360 mm f/6.3
- Mamiya 360 mm f/6.3 C
- Mamiya 360 mm f/6.3 K/L
- Mamiya 500 mm f/8.0 C
- Mamiya 500 mm f/6.0 APO/L
- Mamiya 100–200 mm f/5.2 C Zoom (current)
- Mamiya No. 1 extension tube (45mm) (Pro/Pro-s and Pro-SD versions)
- Mamiya No. 2 extension tube (82mm) (Pro/Pro-s and Pro-SD versions)

=== Mamiya RZ lenses ===
Mamiya RZ lenses feature Seiko #1 electronic shutters.

- Mamiya 37 mm f/4.5 Fisheye (current)
- Mamiya 50 mm f/4.5
- Mamiya 50 mm f/4.5 ULD L (current)
- Mamiya 65 mm f/4.0
- Mamiya 65 mm f/4.0 L-A(current)
- Mamiya 75 mm f/3.5 L
- Mamiya 75 mm f/4.5 L Short Barrel
- Mamiya 75 mm f/4.5 Shift (current)
- Mamiya 90 mm f/3.5 (current)
- Mamiya 110 mm f/2.8
- Mamiya 110 mm f/2.8 W (current)
- Mamiya 127 mm f/3.8
- Mamiya 127 mm f/3.5
- Mamiya 140 mm f/4.5 Macro
- Mamiya 140 mm f/4.5 L-A Macro (current)
- Mamiya 150 mm f/3.5 (current)
- Mamiya 180 mm f/4.0 D/L Variable Soft Focus (current)
- Mamiya 180 mm f/4.5 Short Barrel (current)
- Mamiya 180 mm f/4.5 W-N (current)
- Mamiya 210 mm f/4.5 APO (current)
- Mamiya 250 mm f/4.5 (current)
- Mamiya 250 mm f/4.5 APO (current)
- Mamiya 350 mm f/5.6 APO (current)
- Mamiya 360 mm f/6.0
- Mamiya 500 mm f/8.0
- Mamiya 500 mm f/6.0 APO
- Mamiya 100–200 mm f/5.2 Zoom (current)

=== Mamiya 6 lenses ===
- Mamiya 50 mm f/4
- Mamiya 75 mm f/3.5
- Mamiya 150 mm f/4.5

=== Mamiya 7 lenses ===
- Mamiya 43 mm f/4.5 (current)
- Mamiya 50 mm f/4.5 (current)
- Mamiya 65 mm f/4.0 (current)
- Mamiya 80 mm f/4.0 (current)
- Mamiya 150 mm f/4.5 (current)
- Mamiya 210 mm f/8.0 (current)

=== Mamiya-Sekor E and EF lenses ===
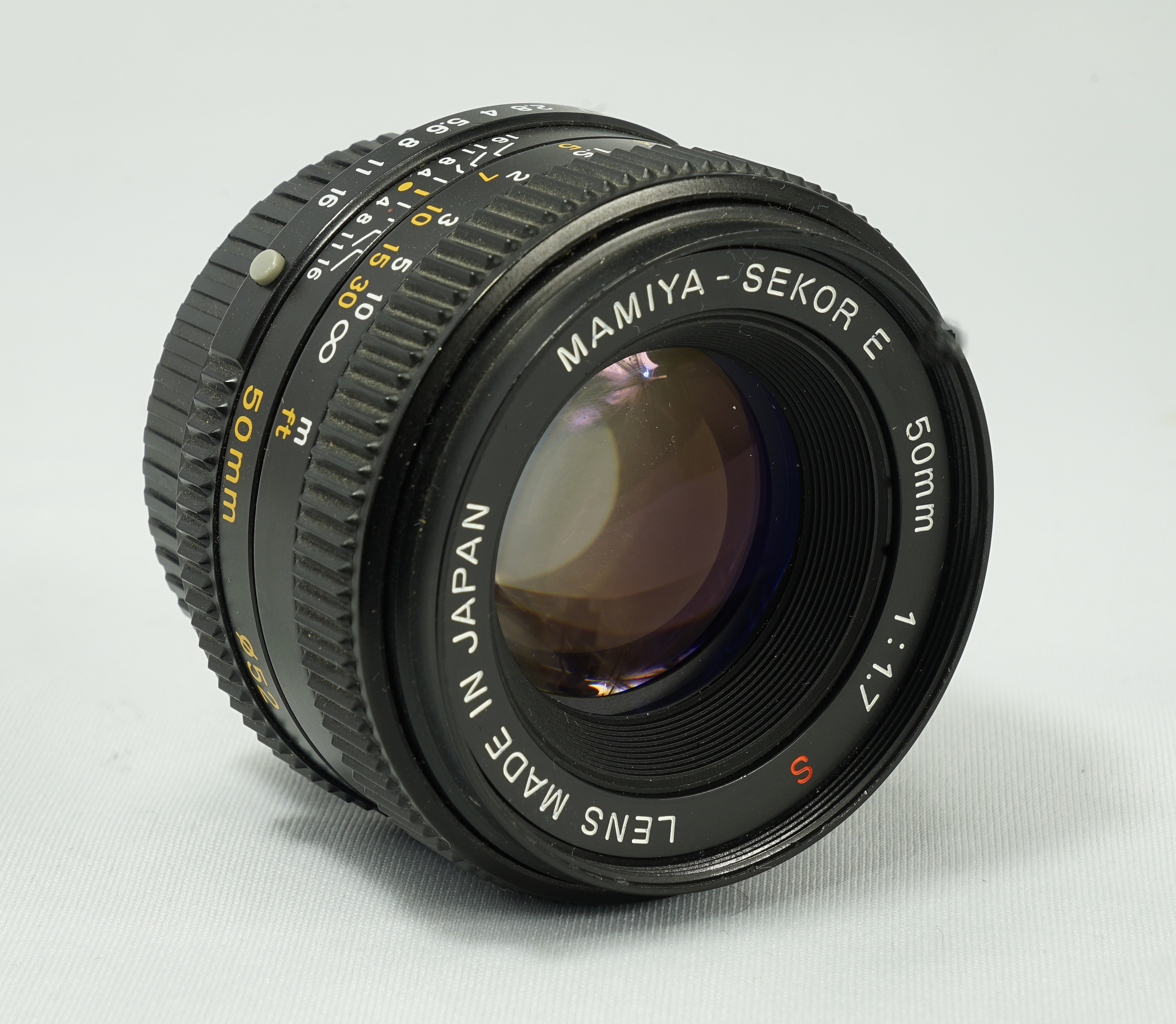
Mamiya-Sekor E f1.7 50 mm

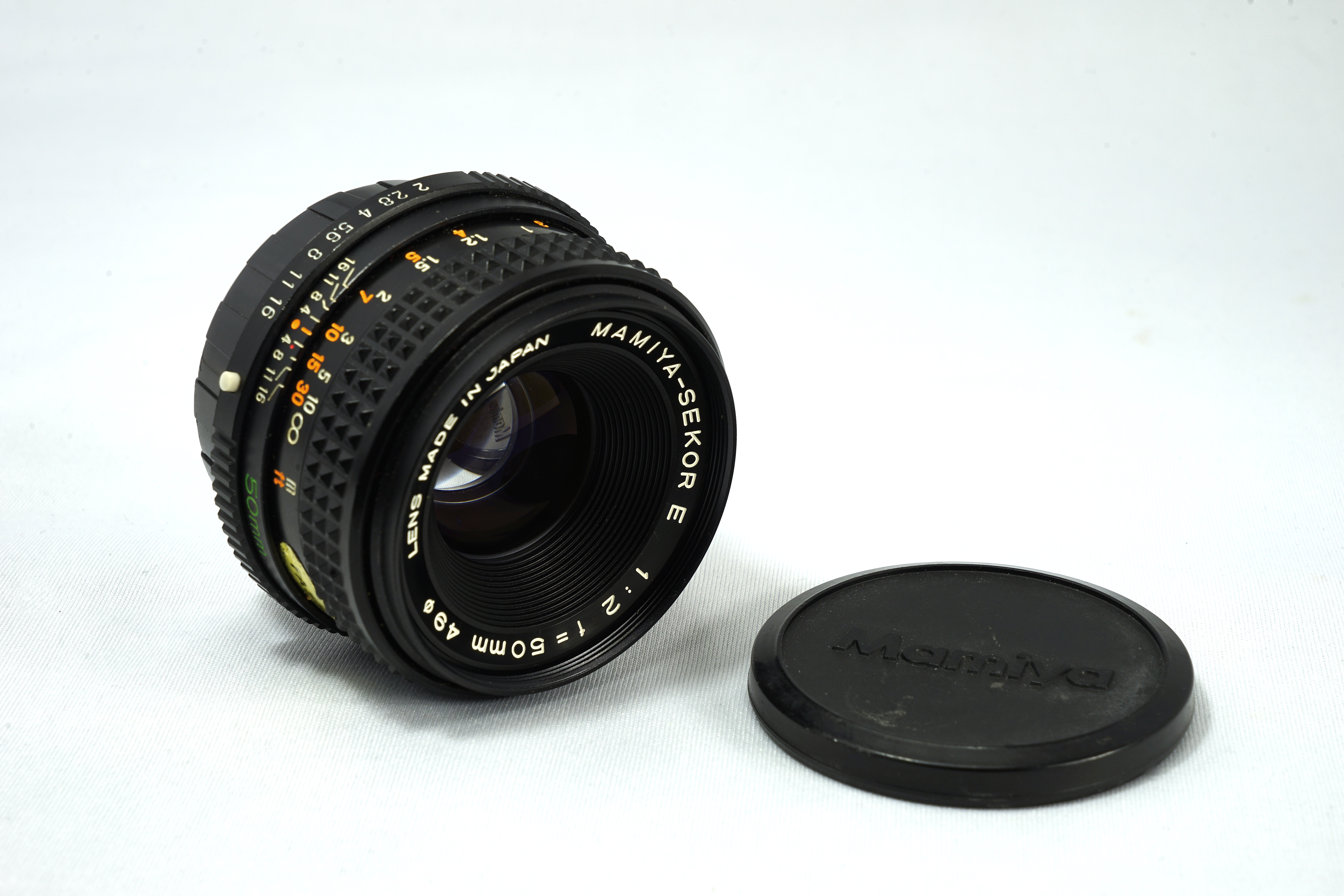
Mamiya-Sekor E f2 50 mm

- Mamiya-Sekor E 1:2.8 f=28mm
- Mamiya-Sekor E 1:3.5 f=28mm
- Mamiya-Sekor E 1:2.8 f=35mm
- Mamiya-Sekor E 1:1.4 f=50mm
- Mamiya-Sekor E 1:1.7 f=50mm
- Mamiya-Sekor E 1:2 f=50mm
- Mamiya-Sekor E 1:3.5 f=50mm Macro
- Mamiya-Sekor E 1:2.8 f=135mm
- Mamiya-Sekor E 1:3.5 f=135mm
- Mamiya-Sekor E 1:4 f=200mm
- Mamiya-Sekor E 1:4 f=300mm
- Mamiya-Sekor Zoom E 1:3.5-4.5 f=28-50mm
- Mamiya-Sekor Zoom E 1:3.5-4.5 f=35-70mm
- Mamiya-Sekor Zoom E 1:3.5-4.3 f=35-105mm
- Mamiya-Sekor Zoom E 1:3.8 f=70-150mm
- Mamiya-Sekor Zoom E 1:3.8 f=80-200mm
- Mamiya-Sekor Zoom E 1:4 f=80-200mm
- Mamiya-Sekor EF 1:2.8 f=35mm
- Mamiya-Sekor EF 1:1.4 f=50mm
- Mamiya-Sekor EF 1:1.7 f=50mm
- Mamiya-Sekor EF 1:2.8 f=135mm

=== Auto Mamiya-Sekor CS lenses ===
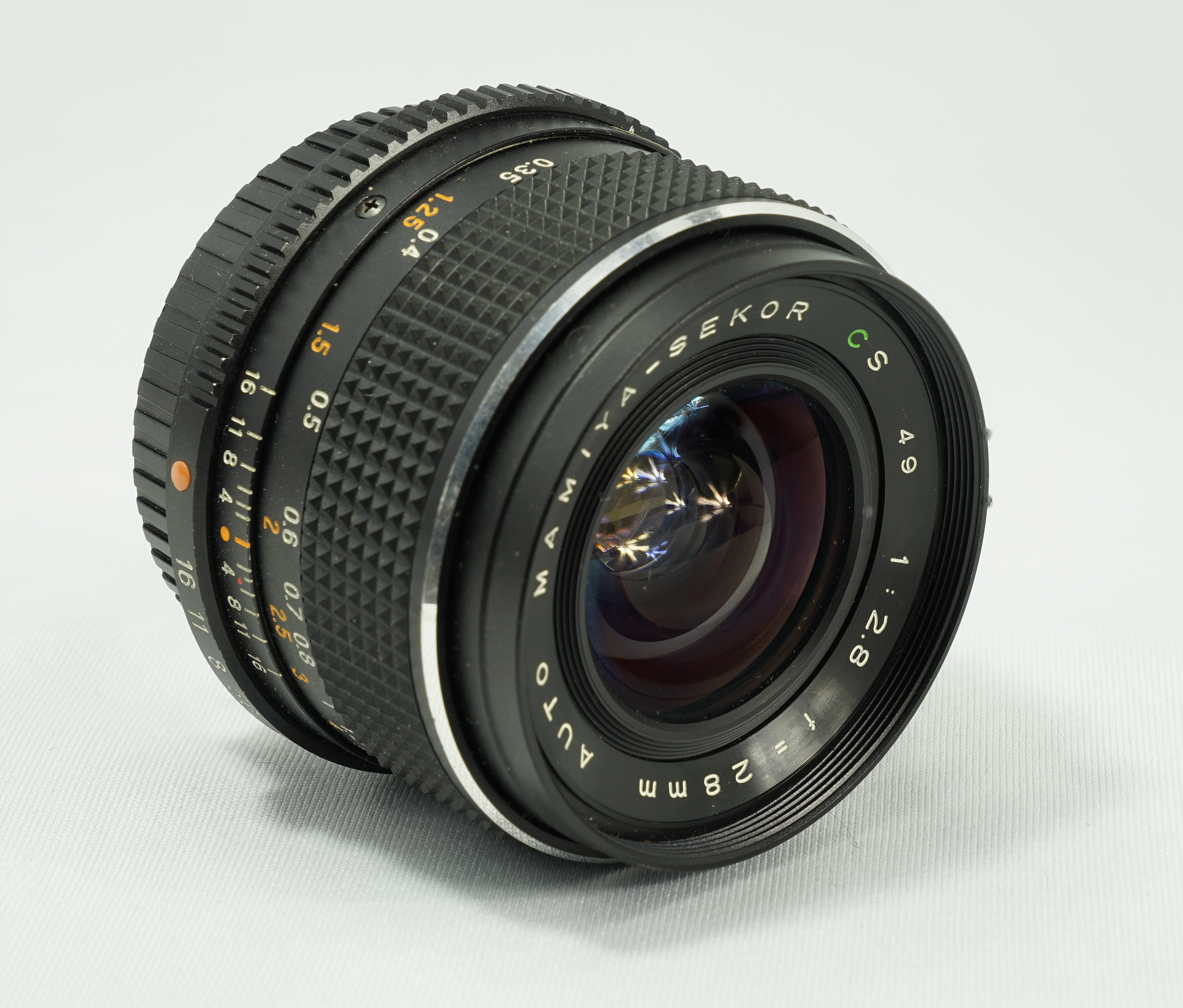
Auto Mamiya-Sekor CS f2.8 28 mm

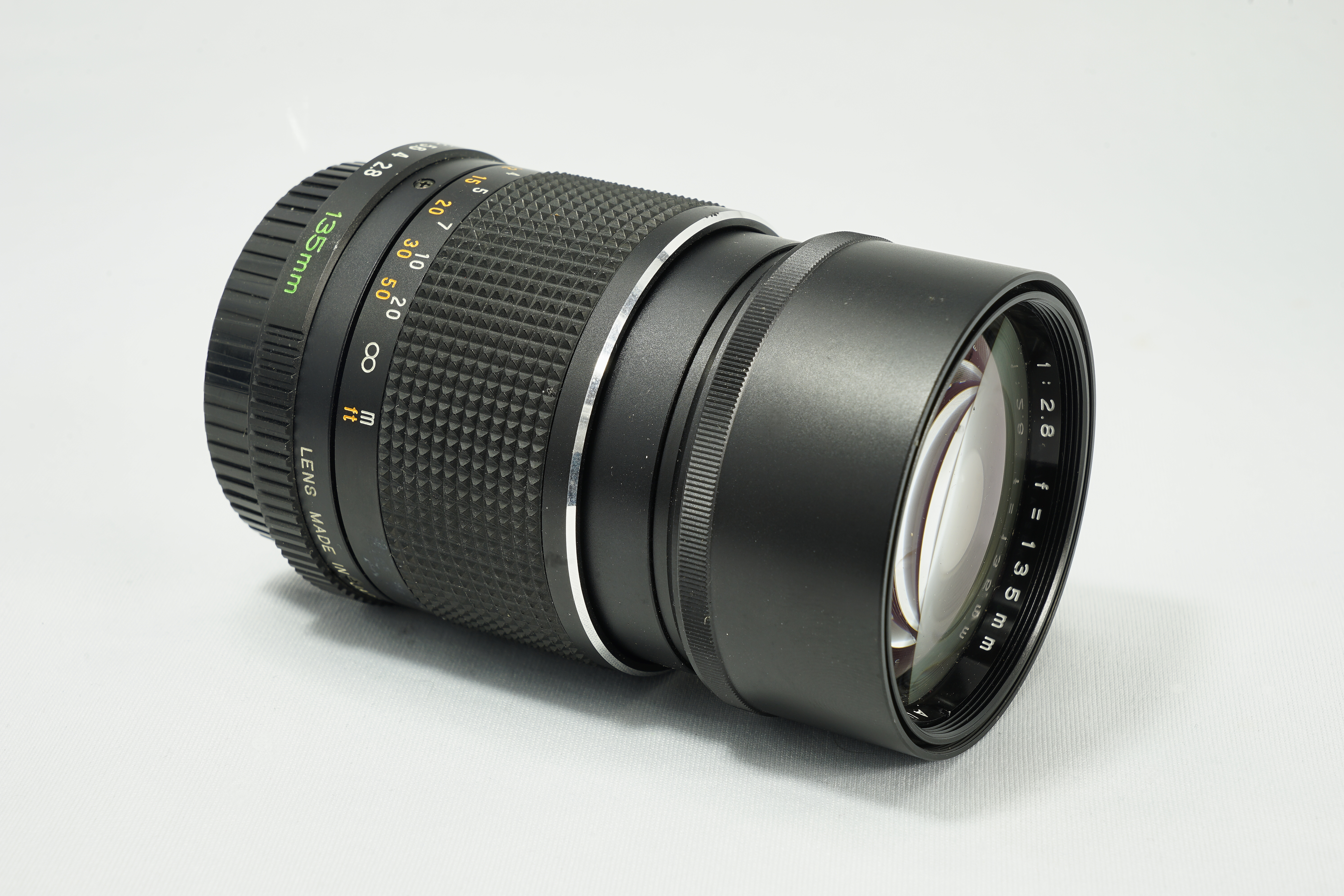
Auto Mamiya-Sekor CS f2.8 135 mm

M42 list from (lenses 3.5/14mm until 3.5/45-90mm) and own collection (lens 3.8/80-200mm)

- Auto Mamiya-Sekor CS 1:3.5 f=14mm Fisheye
- Auto Mamiya-Sekor CS 1:2.8 f=21mm
- Auto Mamiya-Sekor CS 1:2.8 f=28mm
- Auto Mamiya-Sekor CS 1:2.8 f=35mm
- Auto Mamiya-Sekor CS 1:1.4 f=50mm
- Auto Mamiya-Sekor CS 1:1.7 f=50mm
- Auto Mamiya-Sekor CS 1:2 f=50mm
- Auto Mamiya-Sekor CS 1:3.5 f=50mm Macro
- Auto Mamiya-Sekor CS 1:2.8 f=135mm
- Auto Mamiya-Sekor CS 1:3.5 f=200mm
- Auto Mamiya-Sekor CS 1:4 f=300mm
- Auto Mamiya-Sekor Zoom CS 1:3.5 f=45-90mm
- Auto Mamiya-Sekor Zoom CS 1:3.8 f=80-200mm

=== Mamiya/Sekor M42 lenses ===
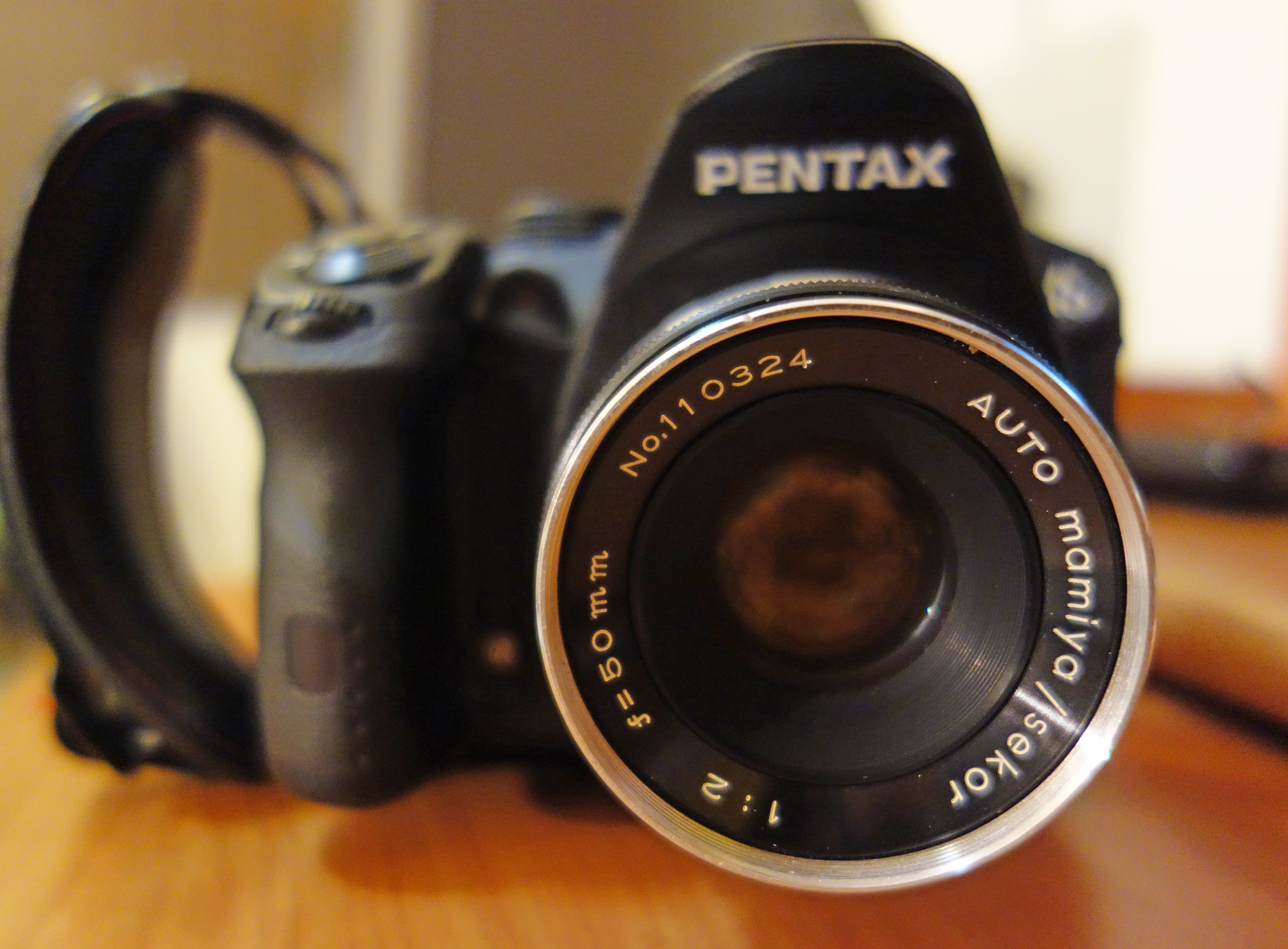
Pentax K-30 with a Mamiya / Sekor 50mm f/2 lens (front)

M42 list from

- AUTO mamiya/sekor 1:2.8 f=28 mm
- AUTO mamiya/sekor 1:2.8 f=28 mm
- AUTO mamiya/sekor 1:2.8 f=28 mm
- AUTO mamiya/sekor 1:2 f=50 mm Model I (DTL Series)
- AUTO mamiya/sekor 1:2 f=50 mm Model II (DTL Series)
- AUTO mamiya/sekor 1:2.8 f=50 mm
- AUTO mamiya/sekor 55 mm 1:1.4
- AUTO mamiya/sekor 1:1.8 f=55 mm
- mamiya-sekor 1:1.7 f=58 mm
- mamiya macro sekor 1:2.8 f=60 mm
- AUTO mamiya/sekor 1:2.8 f=135 mm (TL Series)
- AUTO mamiya/sekor 1:2.8 f=135 mm (DTL Series)
- AUTO mamiya/sekor 1:3.5 f=200 mm Model III
- mamiya/sekor 1:6.3 f=400 mm

The mamiya/sekor 55mm 1:1.4 is known to have radioactive thorium glass elements.

== Accessories ==
=== Flash units ===
- Mamiyalite ZE
- Mamiyalite MZ 36R
- Mamiya Auto 480
- Mamiya Auto 480 Model 2

=== Digital camera backs ===
- Mamiya ZD Back — compatible with 645AFDII, 645AFDIII and through HX701 adapter RZ67 Pro IID
- Mamiya DM22 — bundled with a 645DF
- Mamiya DM28 — bundled with a 645DF
- Mamiya DM33 — bundled with a 645DF

== Gallery ==
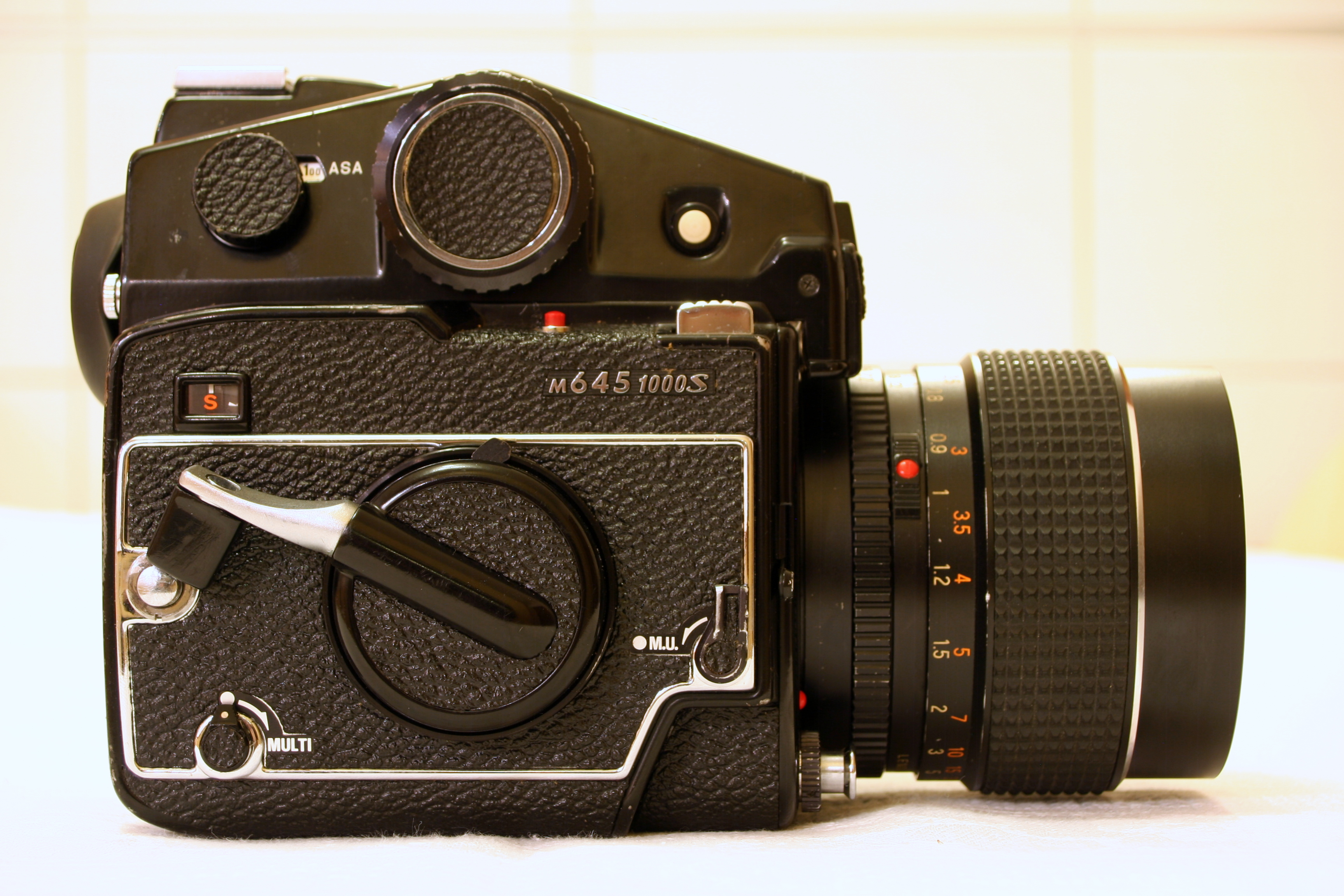
Mamiya M645 1000S

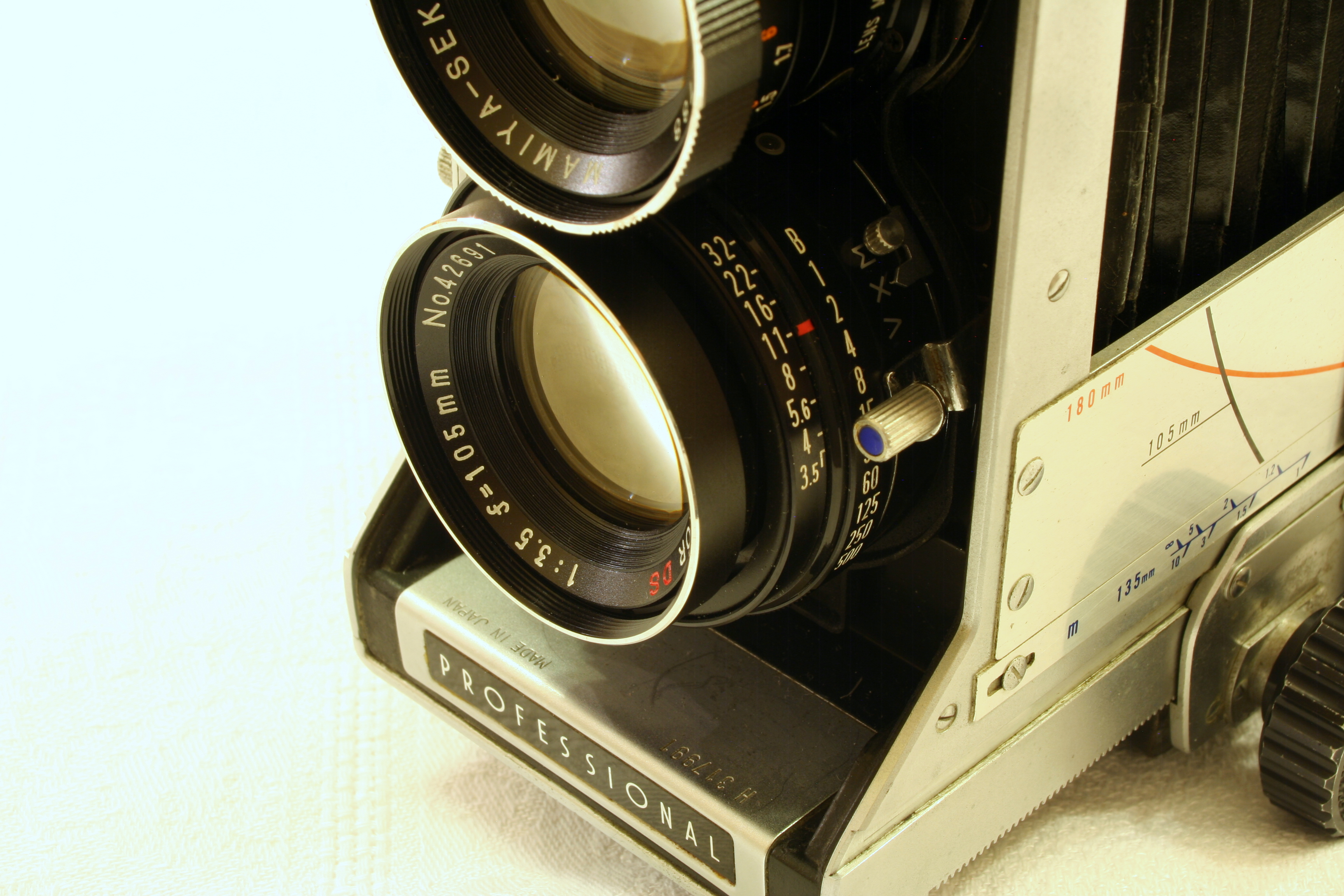
Mamiya C33 focus chart

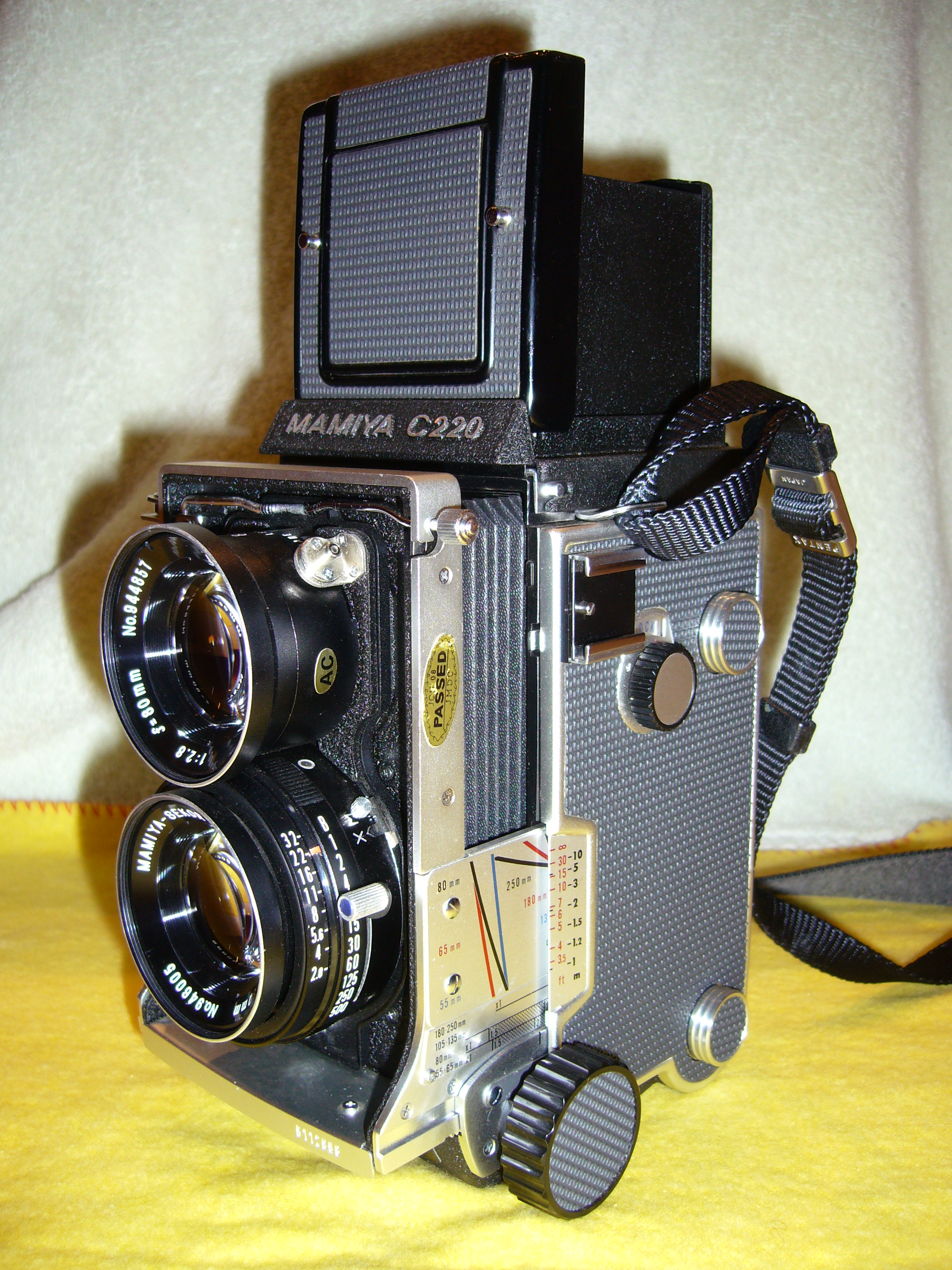
Mamiya C220

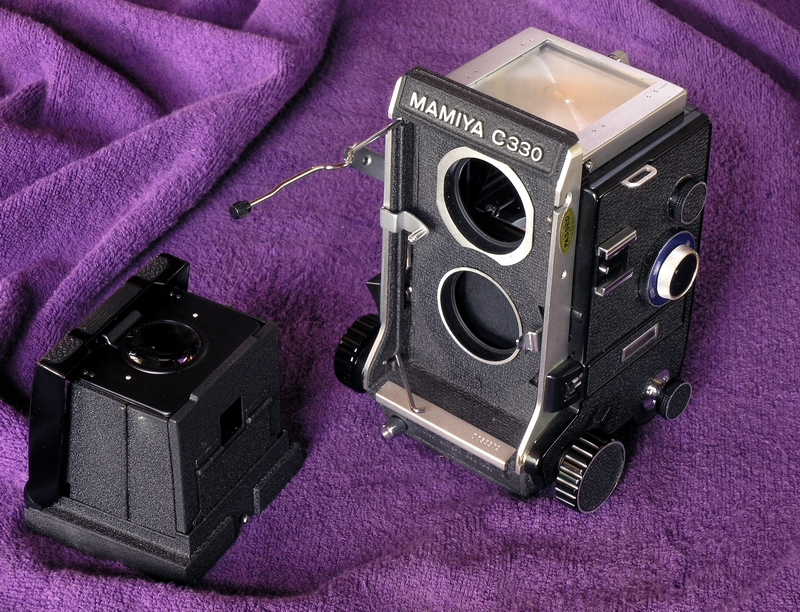
Mamiya C330 with lenses removed

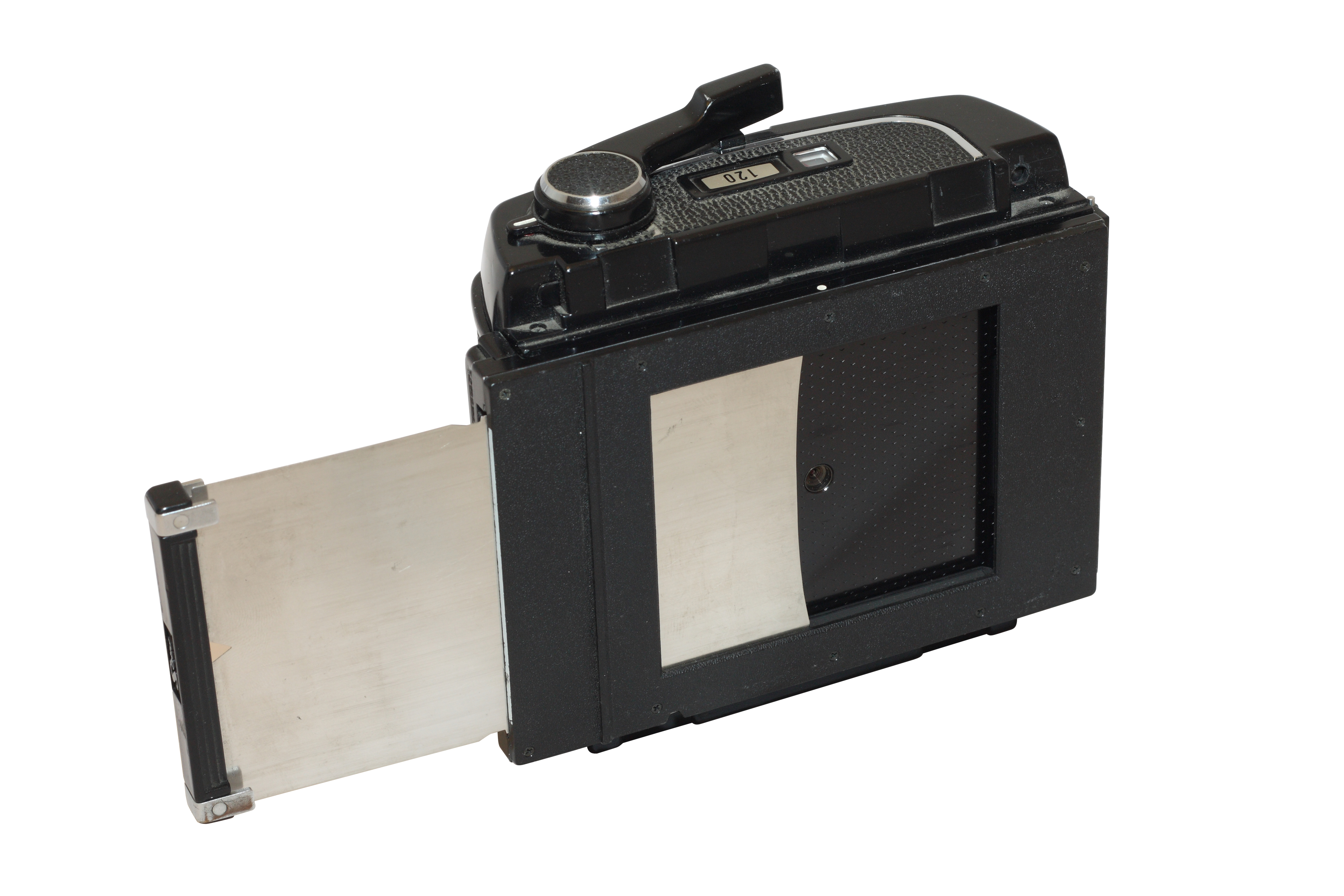
Mamiya RB67 120 film back

animation of Mamiya RZ67 focusing
