= Mamiya 6 =

Medium-format rangefinder system camera

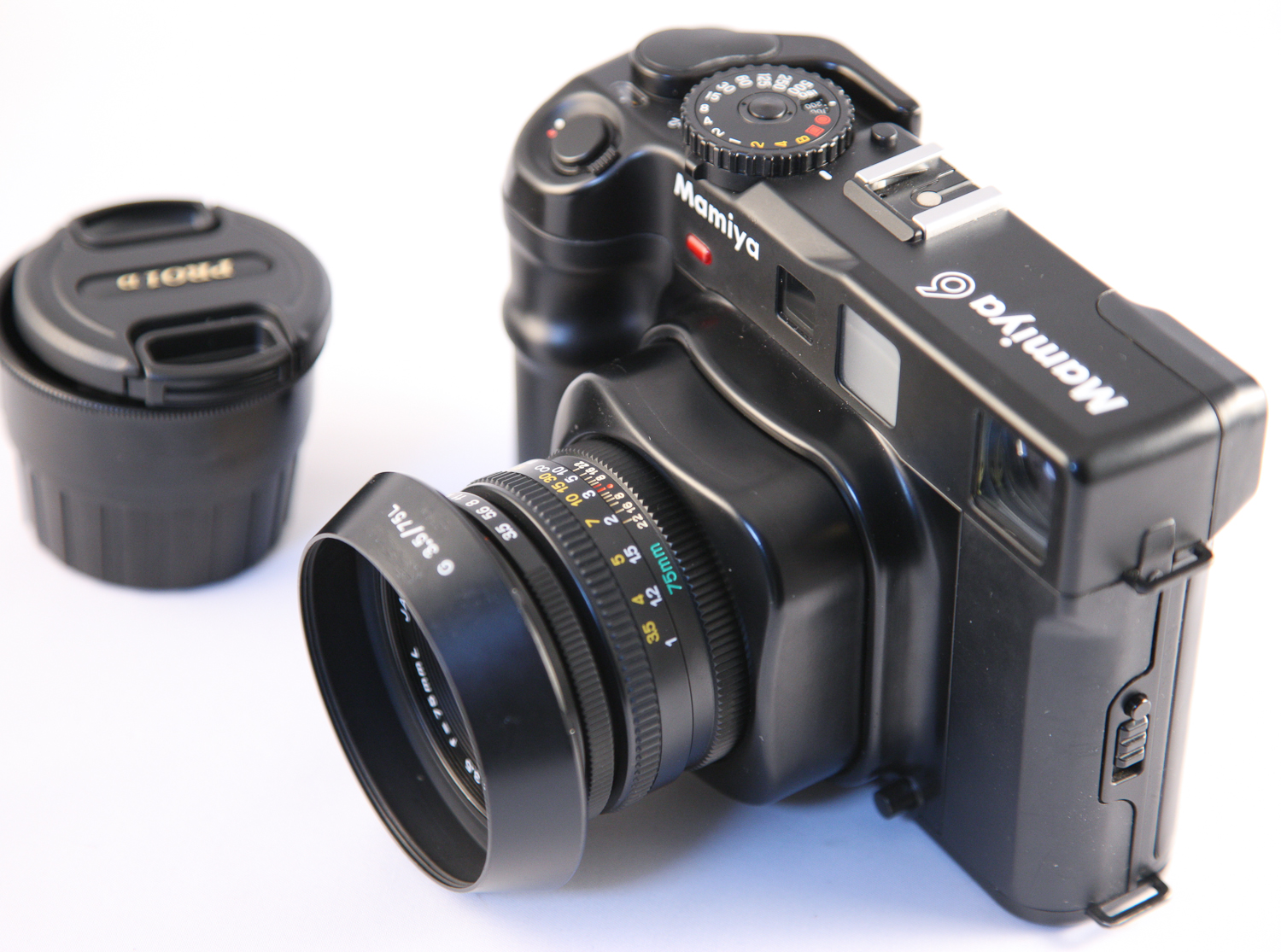
Mamiya 6, 75mm

The Mamiya 6 is a medium-format rangefinder system camera manufactured by Mamiya. It was introduced in 1989, and the line was discontinued in 1995.

The coupled viewfinder windows displays frame lines appropriate to the lens mounted. The lens mount partially collapses when the camera is not in use, making it more compact. The camera has a built-in dark slide that allows the electronic leaf shutter lenses to be changed with film in the camera.

It can operate in auto exposure, auto exposure lock, and manual modes. It captures twelve 6 cm × 6 cm images on 120 film rolls and 24 on 220 film. The camera also features a self-timer, hot shoe, and flash synchronization terminal.

The Mamiya 6 MF was introduced in 1993. It includes an adapter that allows 6×4.5 cm formatted images to be produced. However, the number of images per roll remains the same because images are horizontally oriented. An optional panoramic adapter allows 24×54 mm images to be captured on 35 mm film. The two new features added additional lines to the viewfinder.

== Lenses ==
=== Mamiya 50mm f/4.0 ===
- Lens construction: 8 elements in 5 groups
- Angle of view: 75˚
- Minimum aperture: 22
- 35 mm equivalent: 32 mm
- Minimum focusing distance: 1m
- Area covered: 94.5 mm x 94.5 mm
- Filter size: 58 mm
- Hood: bayonet type
- Dimensions: 55 mm (length) x 64 mm (diameter)
- Weight: 335g

=== Mamiya 75mm f/3.5 ===
- Lens construction: 6 elements in 4 groups
- Angle of view: 55˚
- Minimum aperture: 22
- 35 mm equivalent: 48 mm
- Minimum focusing distance: 1m
- Area covered: 63.2 mm x 63.2 mm
- Filter size: 58 mm
- Hood: bayonet type
- Dimensions: 43 mm (length) x 64 mm (diameter)
- Weight: 250g

=== Mamiya 150mm f/4.5 ===
- Lens construction: 6 elements in 5 groups
- Angle of view: 30˚
- Minimum aperture: 32
- 35 mm equivalent: 96 mm
- Minimum focusing distance: 1.8m
- Area covered: 56.2 mm x 56.2 mm
- Filter size: 67 mm
- Hood: screw-in type
- Dimensions: 86 mm (length) x 70 mm (diameter)
- Weight: 480g

== See also ==
- Mamiya 7
- List of Mamiya products
