= List of Canon products =

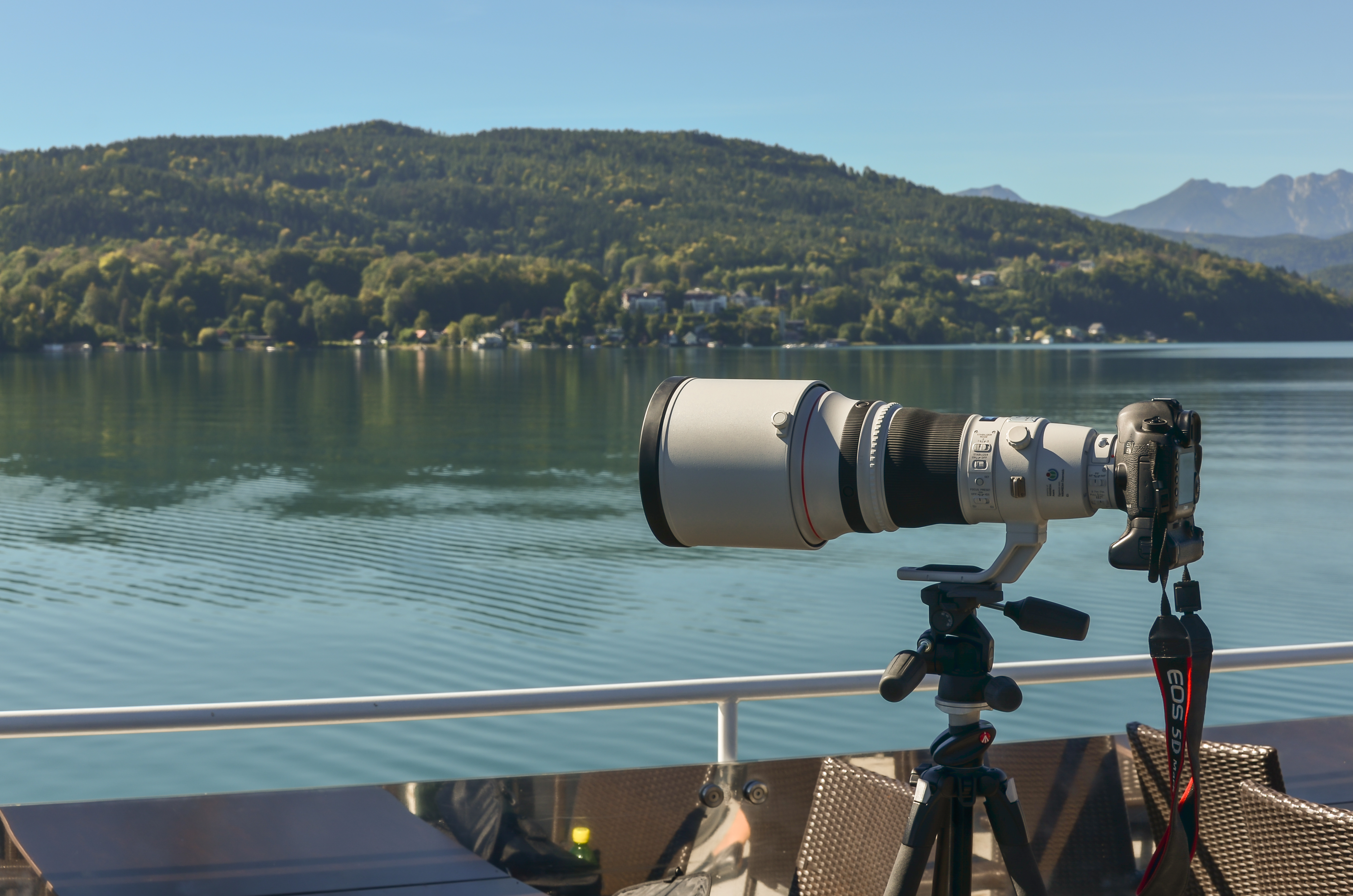
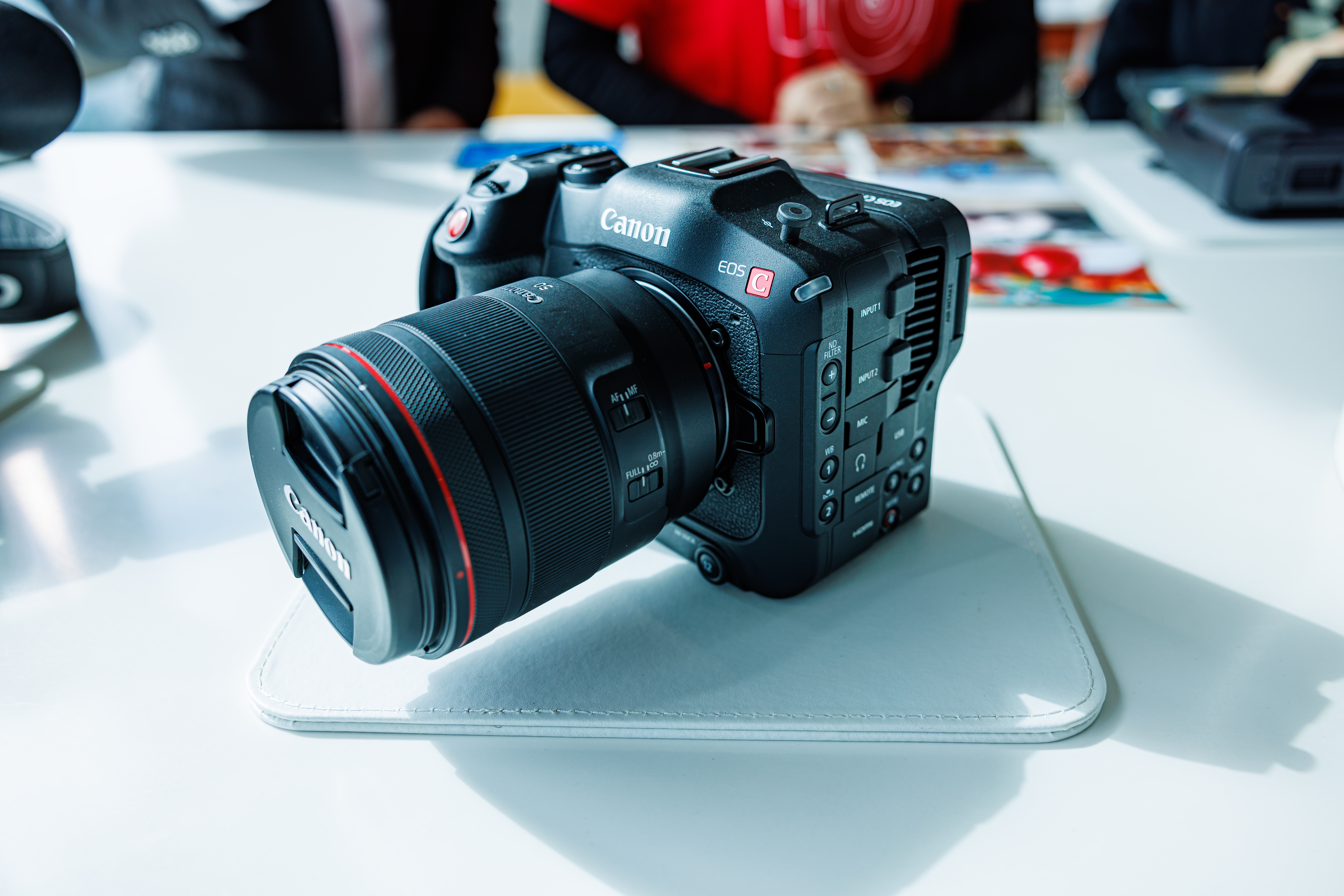
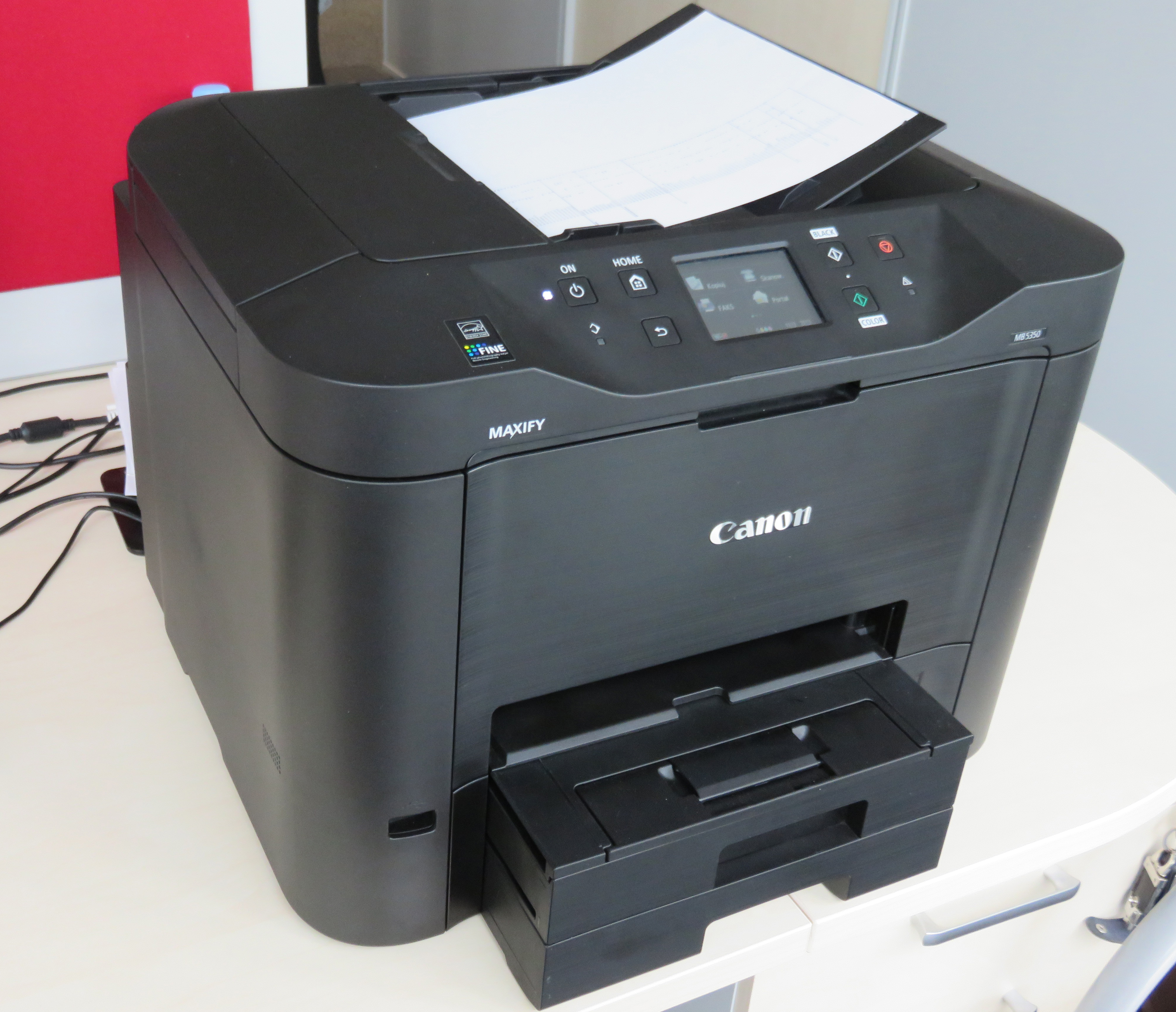
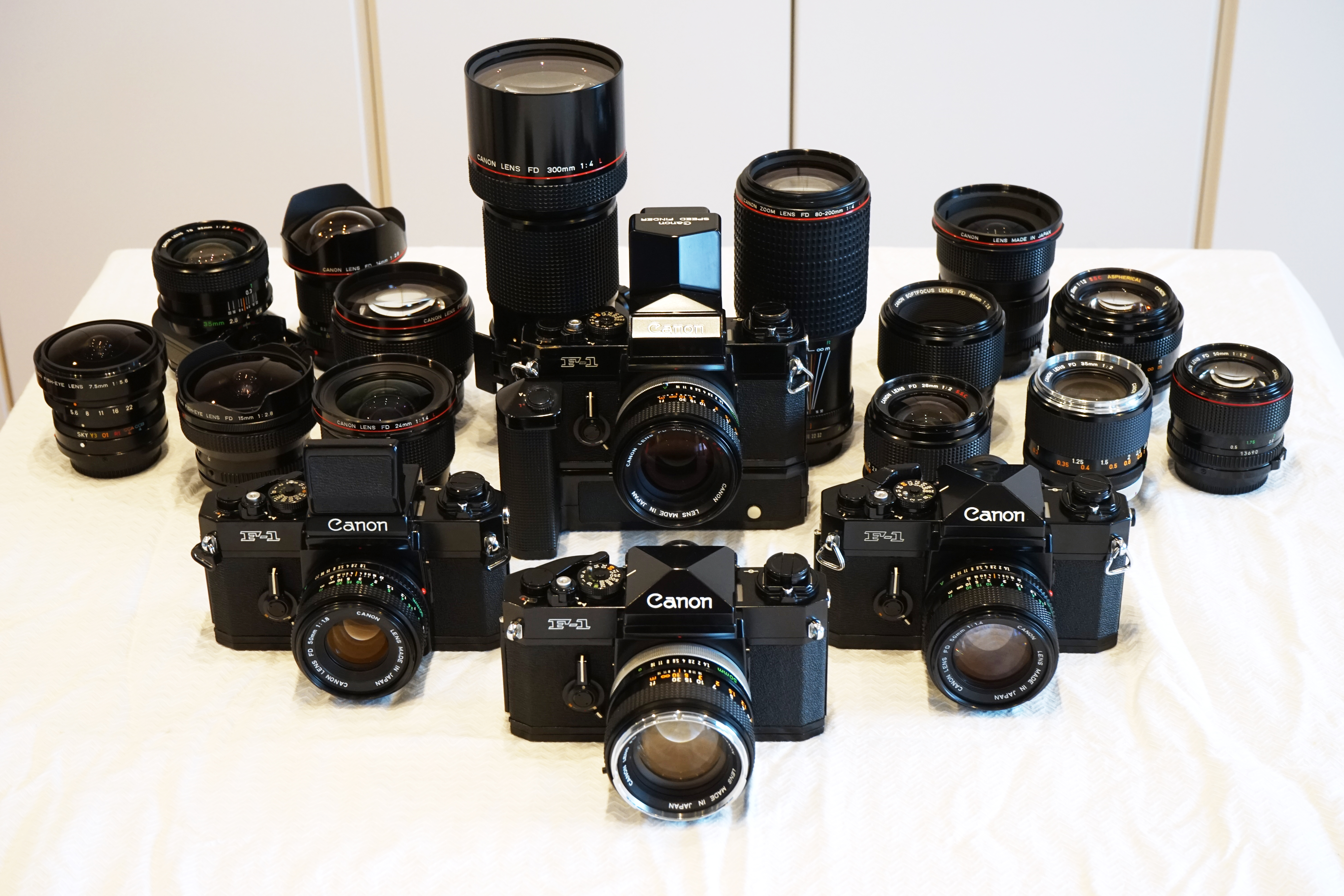
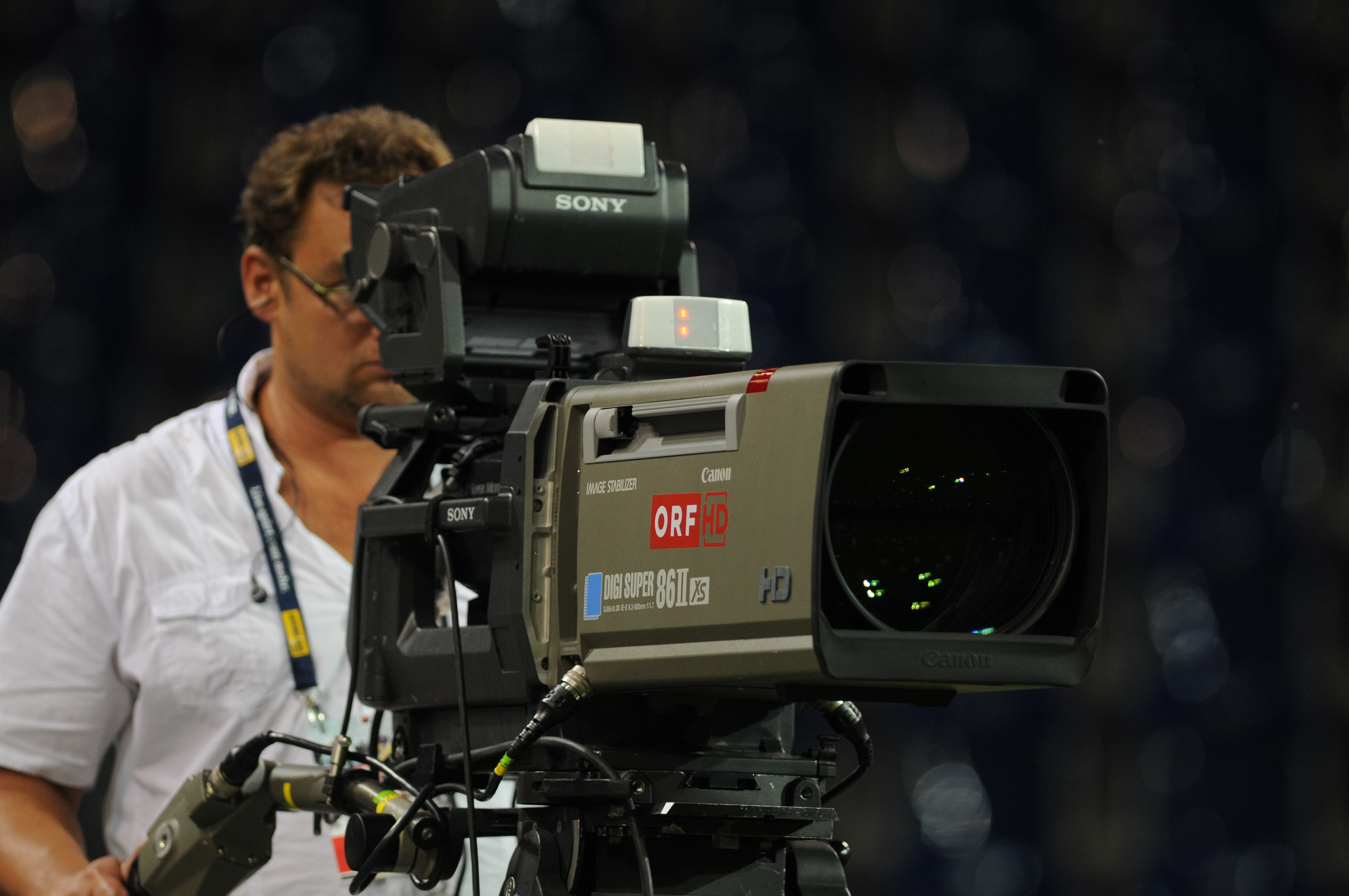
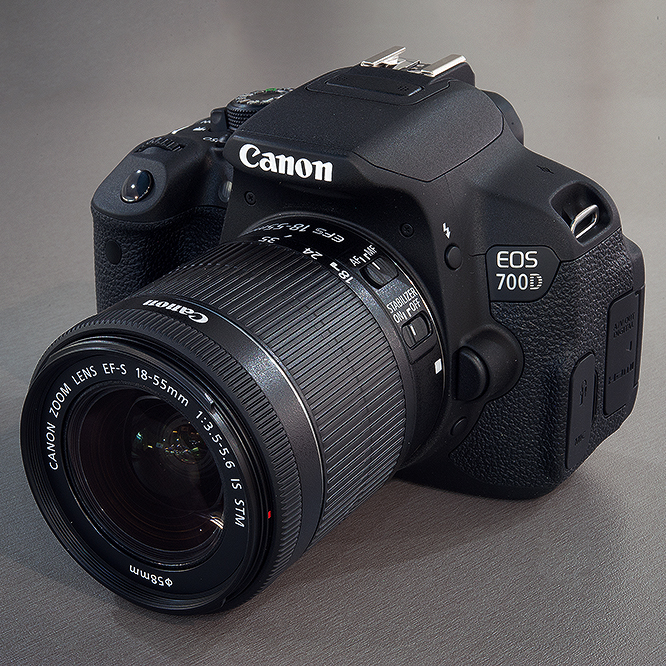
Various Canon products

The following provides a partial list of products manufactured under the Canon brand.

Other products manufactured and/or service-rendered under the Canon brand may not appear here. Such products may include office or industrial application devices, wireless LAN products, and semiconductor and precision products.

== Slide, 8 mm and Super 8 mm film projectors ==
=== Slide projectors ===
- Auto Timer Slide Projector (1959)
- Auto Slide Projector (1959)
- Slidester (Apr 1962)
- Slidester 300 (May 1964)
- Auto Slide 500 (Mar 1968)
- Slidester 302 (Jan 1970)
- Auto Slide 650EF (Jul 1973)

=== Regular 8 mm projectors ===
- Canon P-8 (1958)
- Auto Projector 8Z (1963)
- Cinestar P-8 (1965)

=== Dual Gauge (Regular, Single orSuper 8 mm) projectors ===
- P-8 Cinestar S (1965 – Feb 1967)
- P-8 Cinestar S-2/Cine Projector S-2 (1967 – Jul 1969)
- Canovision 8 (1967)
- Cine Projector P-400 (1968)
- Cinestar S-400/Cine Projector S-400 (1969)
- Canovision 8-2 (1970)
- Cine Projector T-1 (1972)

=== Single 8 or Super 8 mm projectors ===
- Sound Projector PS-1000 (Mar 1977)
- Cine Projector P-777 (1977)

== Cameras ==
=== Rangefinder film cameras ===
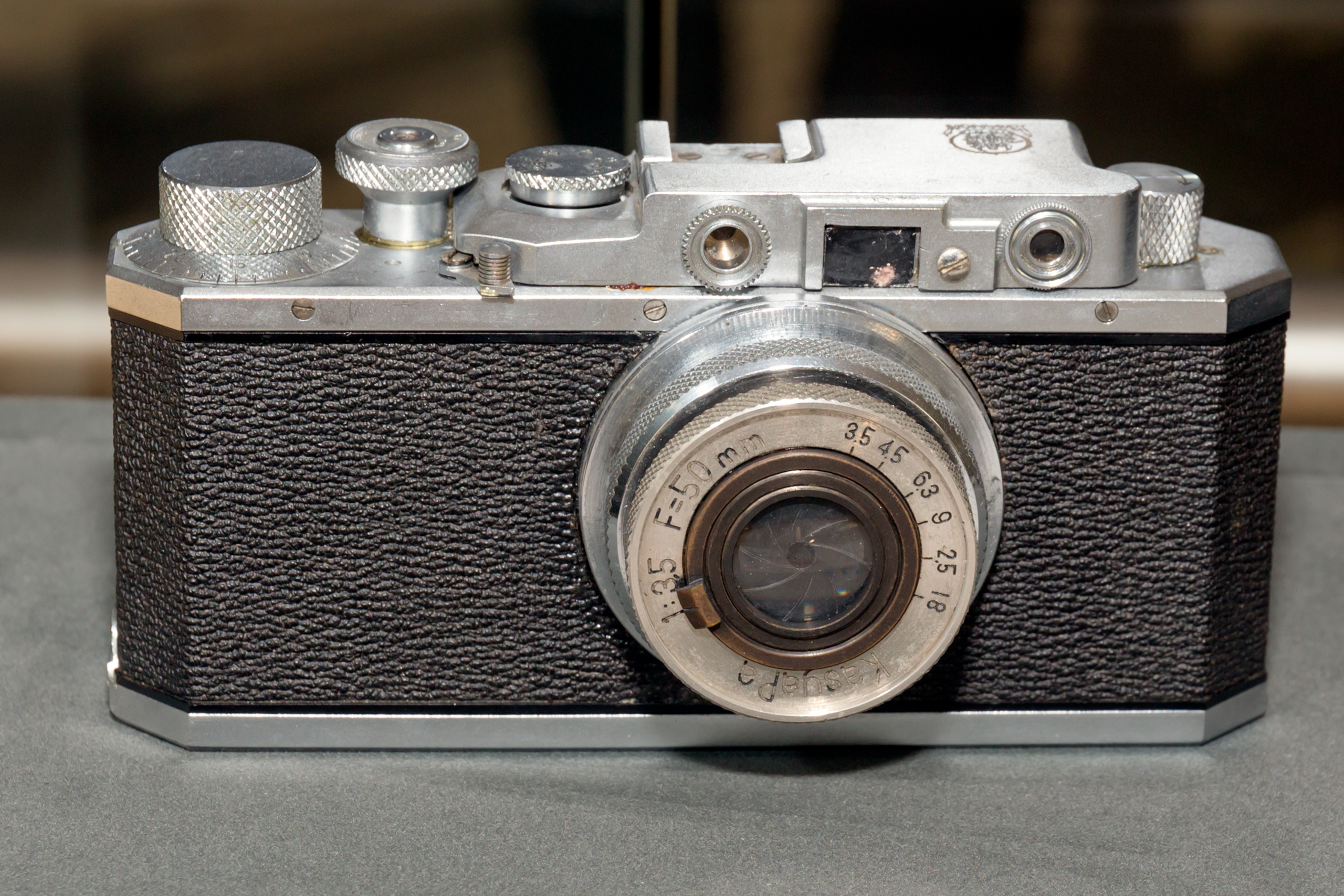
Kwanon

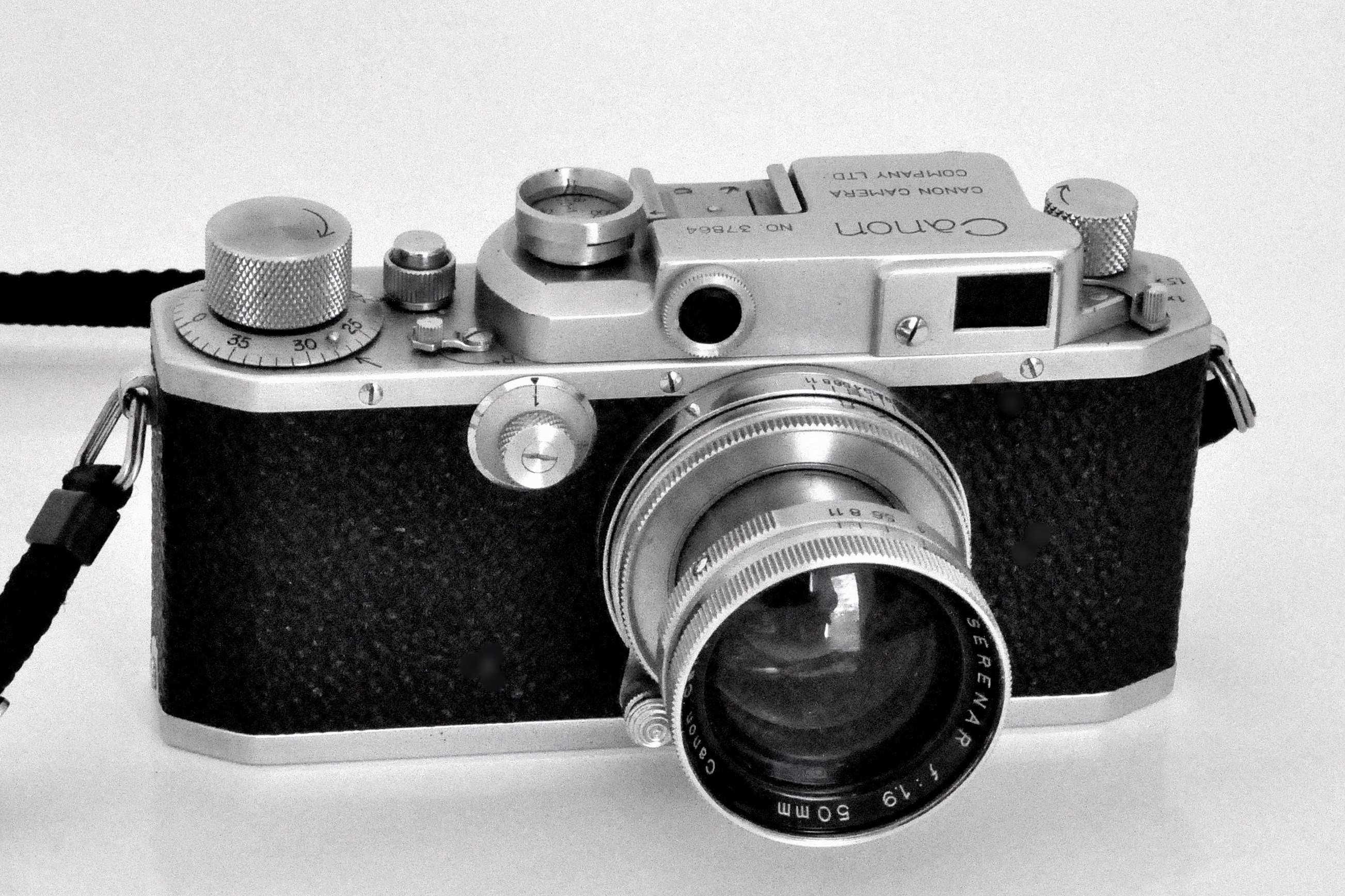
Canon II B

Seiki Kogaku (now Canon) began to develop and subsequently to produce rangefinder cameras with the Kwanon prototype in 1933, based on the Leica II 35mm camera, with separate rangefinder and view finder systems (3 windows). Production began with the Hansa Canon on the Leica III format through World War II. Post war, Canon resumed production of pre-war designs in early 1946 with the JII viewfinder and the S1 rangefinder. But in late 1946 they introduced the SII which departed from the Leica design by offering a combined viewfinder/rangefinder system, reducing the windows on the front of the camera to two. However, in most other respects these cameras remained visually similar to the Leica III.

- Kwanon (1933) Nippon Kogaku (now Nikon) provided Seiki Kogaku with funding, Nikkor lenses, rangefinders, and technical assistance
- Canon (1936) Known today as the "Original Canon" The viewfinder moved to the top of the camera, differing from the Leica
- Hansa Canon (1936) Omiya Trading Co marketed original Canon with the Hansa name above the Canon name on the top
- Canon S (1939) Standard model. The word "Hansa" disappeared from the brand name, and was replaced with just "Canon"
- Canon NS (1939) New Standard. A Canon S without the slow shutter speeds
- Canon J (1939) J stands for Junior a non-rangefinder model.
- Canon J II (1946) Similar if not the same as prewar cameras
- Canon S (1946) Similar if not the same as prewar cameras
- Canon S II (1946) A redesign with combined range finder and viewfinder functions – two windows
- Canon II B (1949)
- Canon II C (1950)
- Canon III (1951)
- Canon IV (1951)
- Canon III A (1951)
- Canon IV S (1952)
- Canon II A (1952)
- Canon II D (1952)
- Canon IV SB (1952)
- Canon II AF (1953)
- Canon II F (1953)
- Canon II AX (1953)
- Canon II S (1954)
- Canon IV Sb2 (1954)
- Canon II S2 (1955)
- Canon II D2 (1955)
- Canon II F2 (1955)

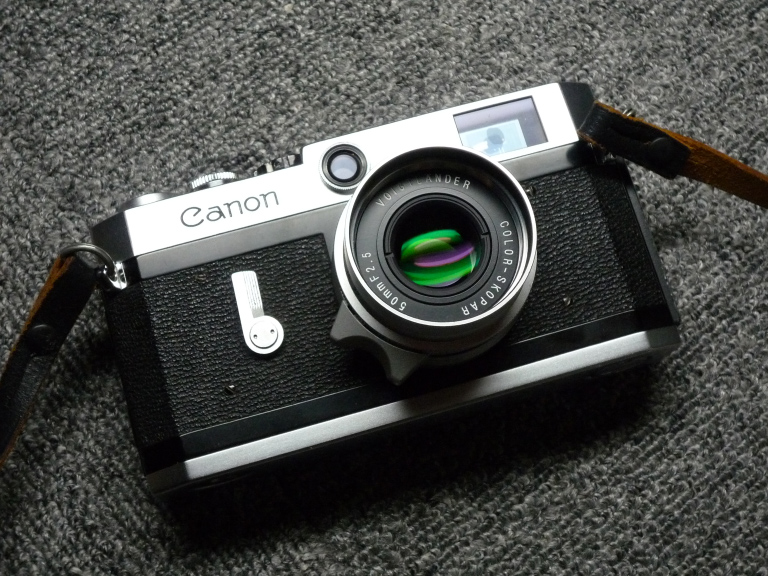
Canon P

In 1956, Canon departed from the Leica II Style and developed a more contemporary look, along with a Contax style self-timer level to the left of the lens mount. This was the first Canon camera with a swing-open camera back for film loading. Upper end models had a new three-mode viewfinders and winding triggers.

- Canon VT (1956)
- Canon L2 (1957)
- Canon VT Deluxe (1957)
- Canon L1 (1957)
- Canon L3 (1957)
- Canon VL (1958)
- Canon VL2 (1958)
- Canon VI T (1958)
- Canon VI L (1958)
- Canon P (Populaire) (1959)
- Canonet (1961) Lower priced simpler camera
- Canon 7 (1961) Including a built-in meter and improved viewfinder system.

Canon partnered with U.S. manufacturer Bell & Howell between 1961 and 1976 and a few Canon products were sold under the Bell & Howell brand e.g. Canon 7 Rangefinder, Canon EX-EE, and the Canon TX.

=== SLR cameras ===
(See also:Template:Table of Canon SLR)

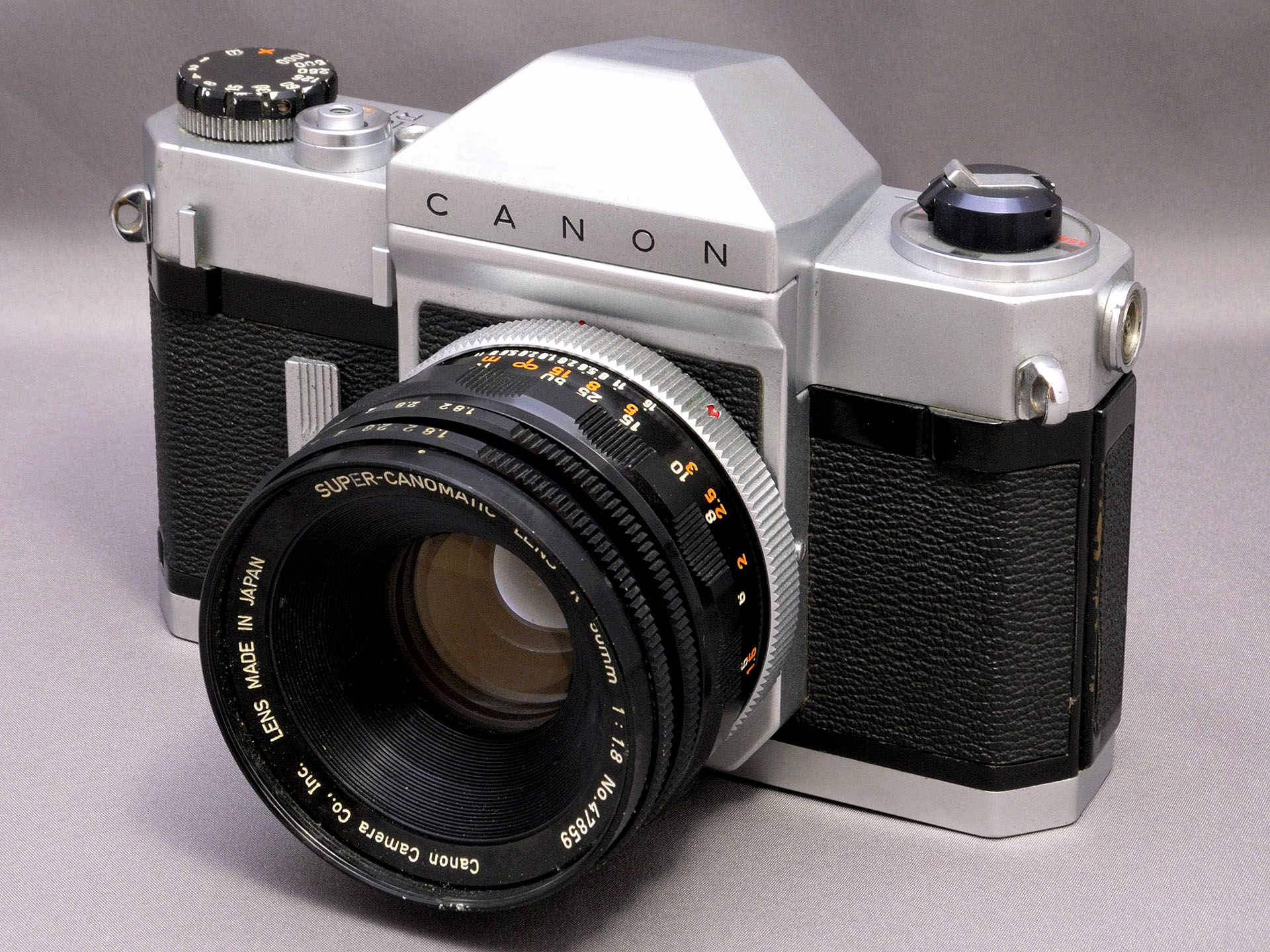
Canonflex RP

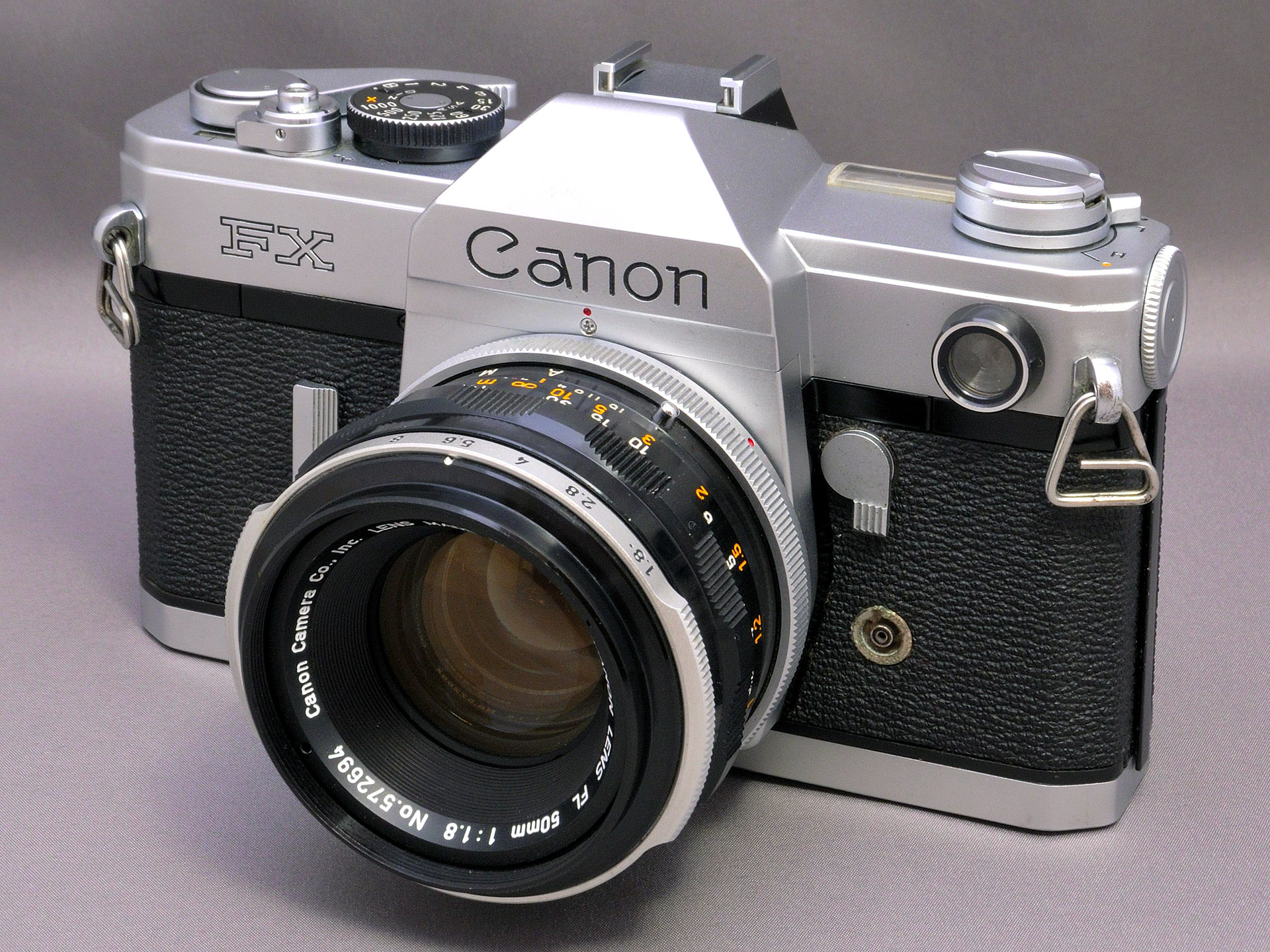
FX

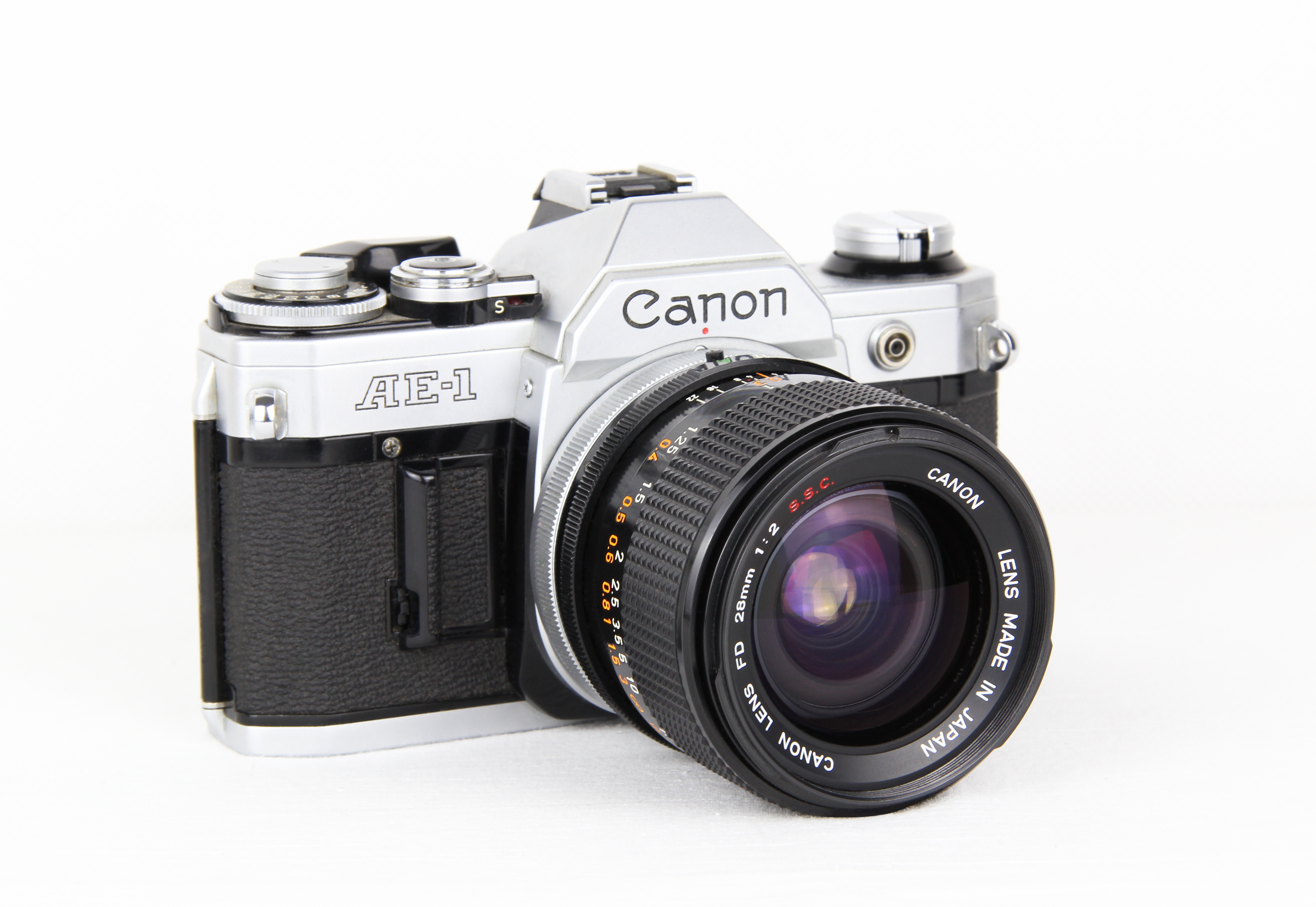
AE-1

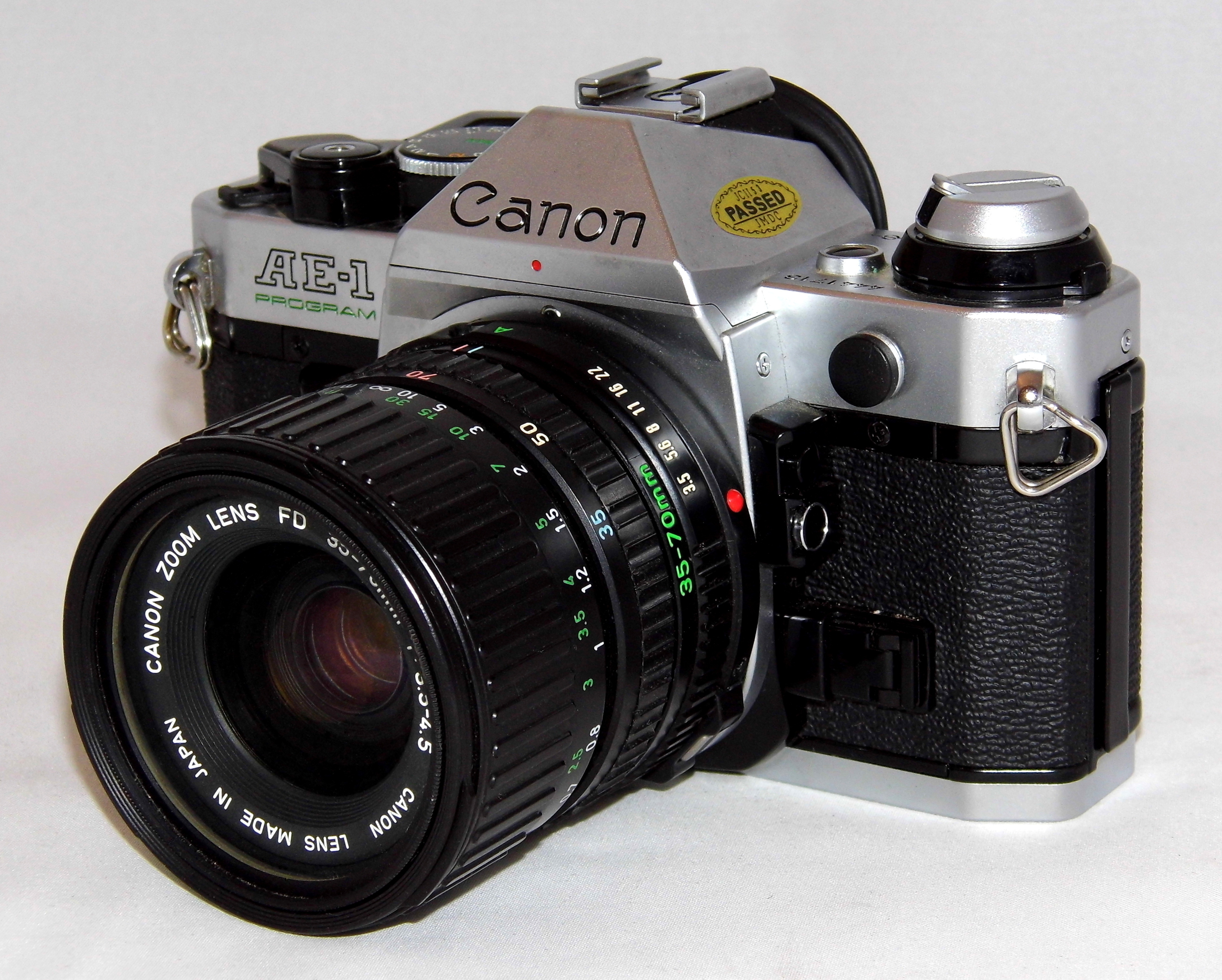
AE-1 Program

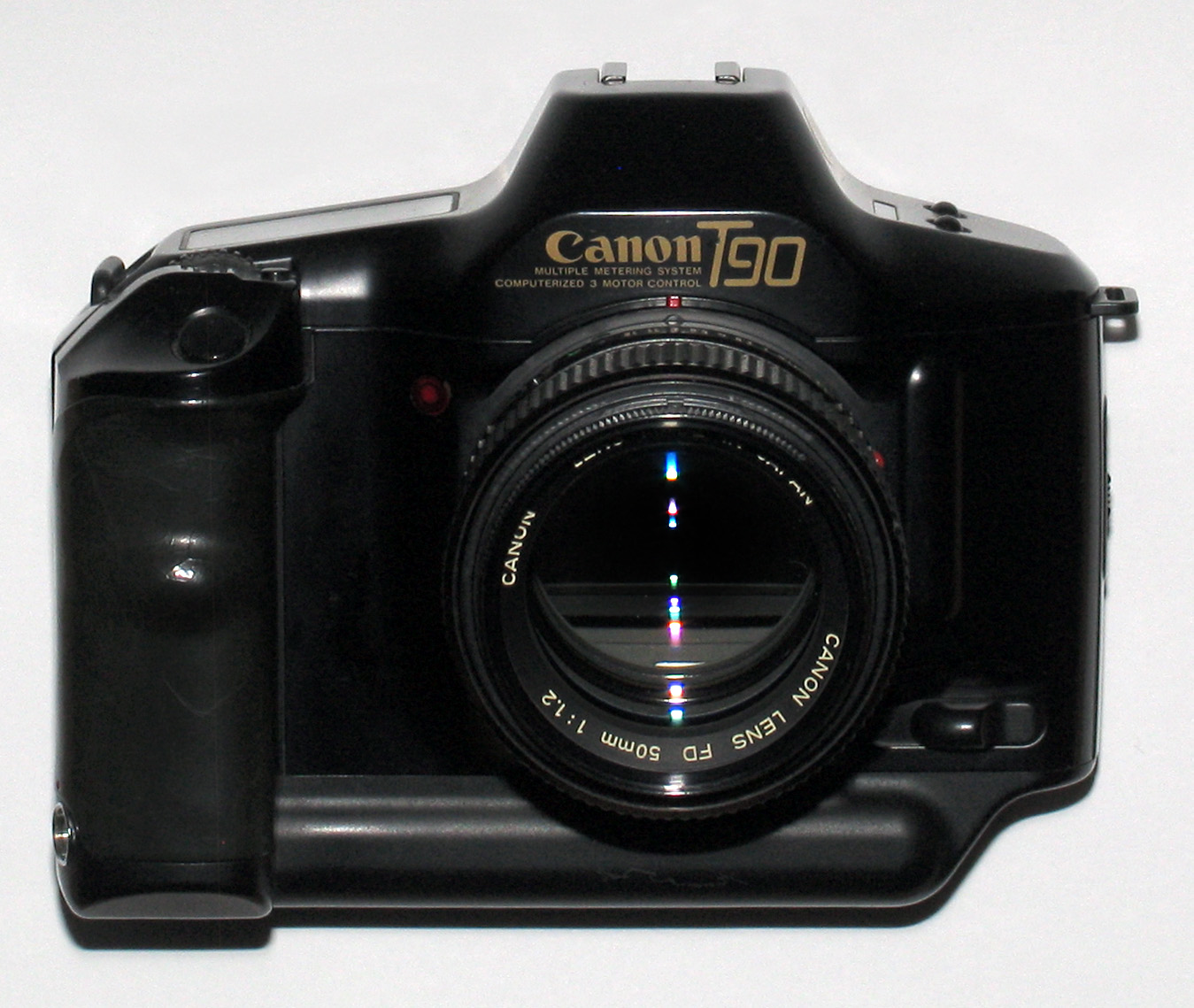
T90

==== Canonflex SLR ====
Canon developed and produced the Canon R lens mount for film SLR cameras in 1959. The FL lens mount replaced R-mounts in 1964.

- Canonflex (1959) – Planned as Canon's first professional-class SLR camera body, but it was not successful. Available with builtin motor-drive option (not detachable).
- Canonflex R2000 (1960) – An upgrade with 1/2000 shutter speed (up from 1/1000)
- Canonflex RP (1960) – simplified Canonflex without the interchangeable prism/viewer
- Canonflex RM (1962) – A redesign of the RP with builtin metering and a lower profile prism. Offered with an f/1.2 58mm lens option

Details

==== FL-mount SLR ====
Canon developed and produced the Canon FL lens-mount standard for film SLR cameras from 1964 to replace the Canon R lens-mount standard. The FD lens mount standard replaced FL-mounts in 1971.

- Canon FX (1964)
- Canon FP (1964)
- Canon Pellix (1965)
- Canon FT QL (1966)
- Canon Pellix QL (1966)
- Canon TL (1968)

==== EE-mount SLR ====
In 1969 Canon introduced an economy camera/lens system where the rear three elements (in two groups) were built-on-to the camera, and several front element options could be interchanged. This had been used by Zeiss-Ikon in their mid-level cameras of their Contaflex series, and by Kodak in early interchangeable lenses for the top-end Retina series (later going to full lenses). Canon offered four lens options: 35mm f/3.5, 50mm f/1.8, 95mm f/3.5, and 125mm f/3.5.

Through the lens metering was center weighted and automatic exposure was shutter speed priority. Only two cameras were offered and the line was not successful.

- Canon EXEE (1969)
- Canon EX Auto (1972) improved auto flash features

==== FD-mount SLR ====
Canon developed and produced the Canon FD lens mount standard for film SLR cameras from 1971 to replace the FL lens mount standard. The FD mount had two variants – original lenses used a breechlock collar to mount whilst later versions used a standard bayonet twist lock with a short twist action. The EF lens mount standard superseded FD-mounts in 1987. Canon ceased to produce FD-mount cameras in 1994.

===== F series =====
- Canon F-1 (1971) – Reputed as Canon's first successful professional-class SLR camera body. The 1959 Canonflex professional camera system (above) failed and was down-featured for the consumer market.
- Canon FTb (1971)
- Canon FTbn (1973)
- Canon EF (1973)
- Canon TLb (1974)
- Canon TX (1975)
- Canon F-1n (1976)
- Canon New F-1 (1981)

===== A series =====
- Canon AE-1 (1976)
- Canon AT-1 (1977)
- Canon A-1 (1978)
- Canon AV-1 (1979)
- Canon AE-1 Program (1981)
- Canon AL-1 (1982)

===== T series =====
- Canon T50 (1983)
- Canon T70 (1984)
- Canon T80 (1985)
- Canon T90 (1986)
- Canon T60 (1990)

==== EOS ====
In 1987, Canon introduced the EOS Single-lens reflex camera system along with the EF lens-mount standard to replace the 16-year-old FD lens-mount standard; EOS became the sole SLR camera-system used by Canon today. Canon also used EOS for its digital SLR cameras. All current film and digital SLR cameras produced by Canon today use the EOS autofocus system. Canon introduced this system in 1987 along with the EF lens mount standard. The last non-EOS based SLR camera produced by Canon, the Canon T90 of 1986, is widely regarded as the template for the EOS line of camera bodies, although the T90 employed the older FD lens-mount standard.

=== Film SLR EOS cameras ===
- Professional (Sealed bodies, maximum durability, magnesium alloy chassis, high performance, and geared towards photojournalism and heavy use).
  - EOS-1V (2000)
  - EOS-1N RS (1995)
  - EOS-1N DP (1994)
  - EOS-1N HS (1994)
  - EOS-1N (1994)
  - EOS-1 HS (1989)
  - EOS-1 (1989)
- Prosumer (Cameras that housed almost all the cutting-edge technology or electronics of the Series 1, but with a slightly less robust construction. Widely used in studios or as a "backup body" for professionals, as well as experienced amateurs).
  - EOS-3 (1998) - Brought fantastic innovations (such as 45-point eye focus control) and was considered the pinnacle of the prosumer category, just below the 1 series.
  - EOS A2 / EOS A2E (1992) - North American version of the famous EOS 5.
  - EOS RT (1989) - Special semi-pro model with fixed translucent mirror (pellicle mirror).
  - EOS 620 (1987) - Launched alongside the first EOS (the 650), the 620 was the variant aimed at the most demanding and professional users before the existence of the classic EOS-1.
- Intermediate (The famous "2-digit series" or "Elan line". They offer the traditional two dials for independent speed and aperture control and robust features, but focused on the advanced amateur).
  - EOS ELAN 7NE / EOS ELAN 7N (2004)
  - EOS ELAN 7E / 7 (2000)
  - EOS IX (1996) - The "Premium / Intermediate" version of the defunct APS film format, made with a metal alloy body.
  - EOS ELAN II / EOS ELAN IIE (1995)
  - EOS ELAN (1991)
  - EOS 10 Commemorative Kit for 60 Million Units (1991)
  - EOS 10 S (1990)
  - EOS 630 (1989)
  - EOS 650 / EOS 650 QD (1987) - The first EOS in history; intermediate in nature at the foundation of the system.
- Entry-Level Cameras (Models designed to be the amateur photographer's first camera, generally called Rebel in the Americas, Kiss in Japan, or with 3 to 4 digits in Europe/Asia. They have predominantly plastic construction, a pentamirror instead of a pentaprism, and simpler controls).
  - EOS REBEL T2 (2004)
  - EOS REBEL K2 (2003)
  - EOS Rebel Ti (2002)
  - EOS Rebel XS N DATE (2002)
  - EOS Kiss III L (2001)
  - EOS REBEL 2000/QD (1999)
  - EOS 3000 / EOS 88 (Asia) (1999)
  - EOS IX Lite (1998) - The entry-level plastic version for APS film.
  - EOS REBEL G (1996)
  - EOS 5000/EOS 888(Asia) (1995)
  - EOS REBEL X (US) (1993)
  - EOS REBEL XS (US) / EOS Kiss (JP) / EOS 500 (EU, AS, OC) (1993)
  - EOS REBEL SII QD (1992)
  - EOS1000F QD (1990)
  - EOS700 (1990)
  - EOS 850 / EOS 850 QD (1988)
  - EOS750 QD (1988)

For more about the EOS system, see Canon EOS.

=== Digital SLR cameras ===
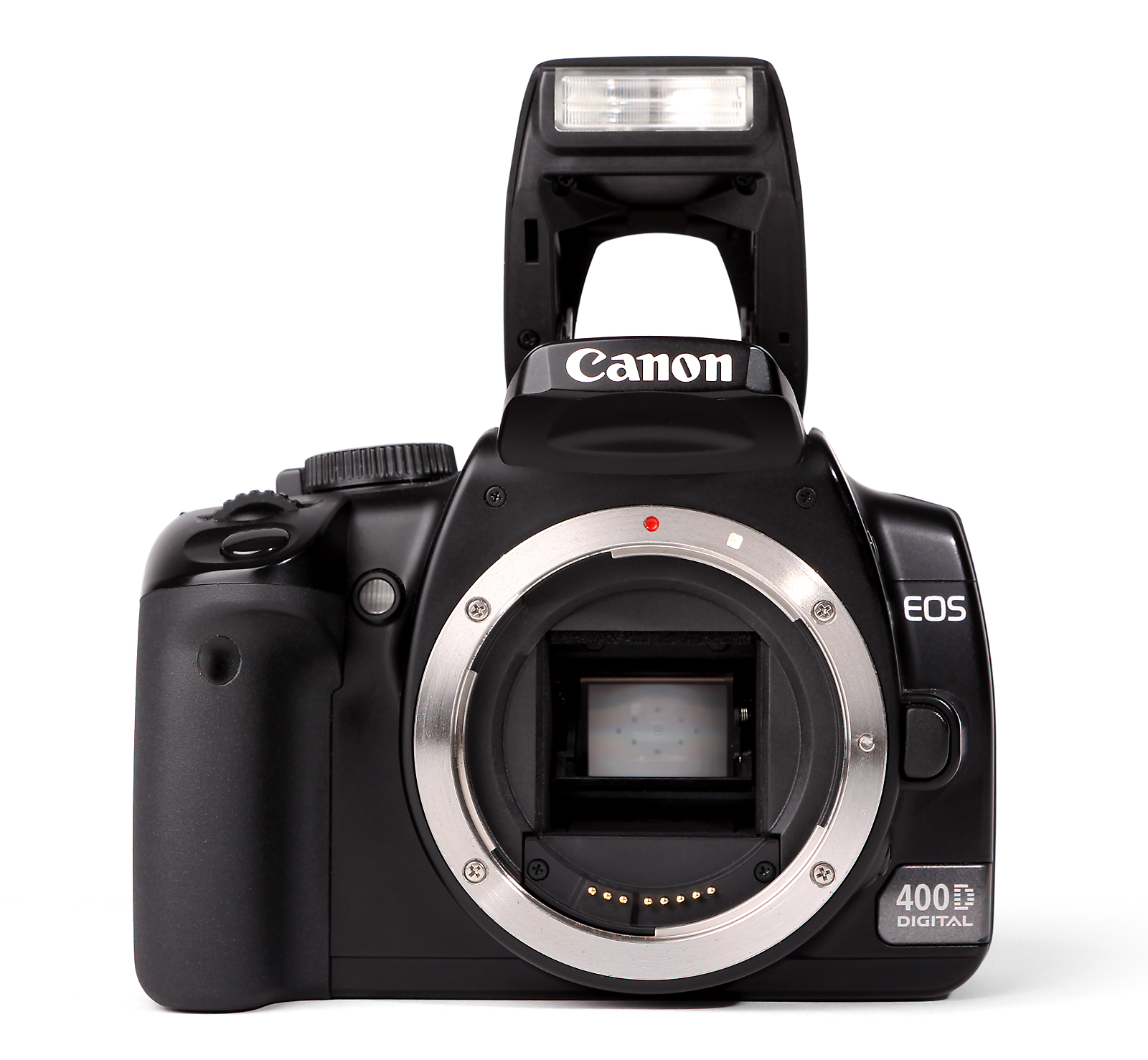
EOS 400D

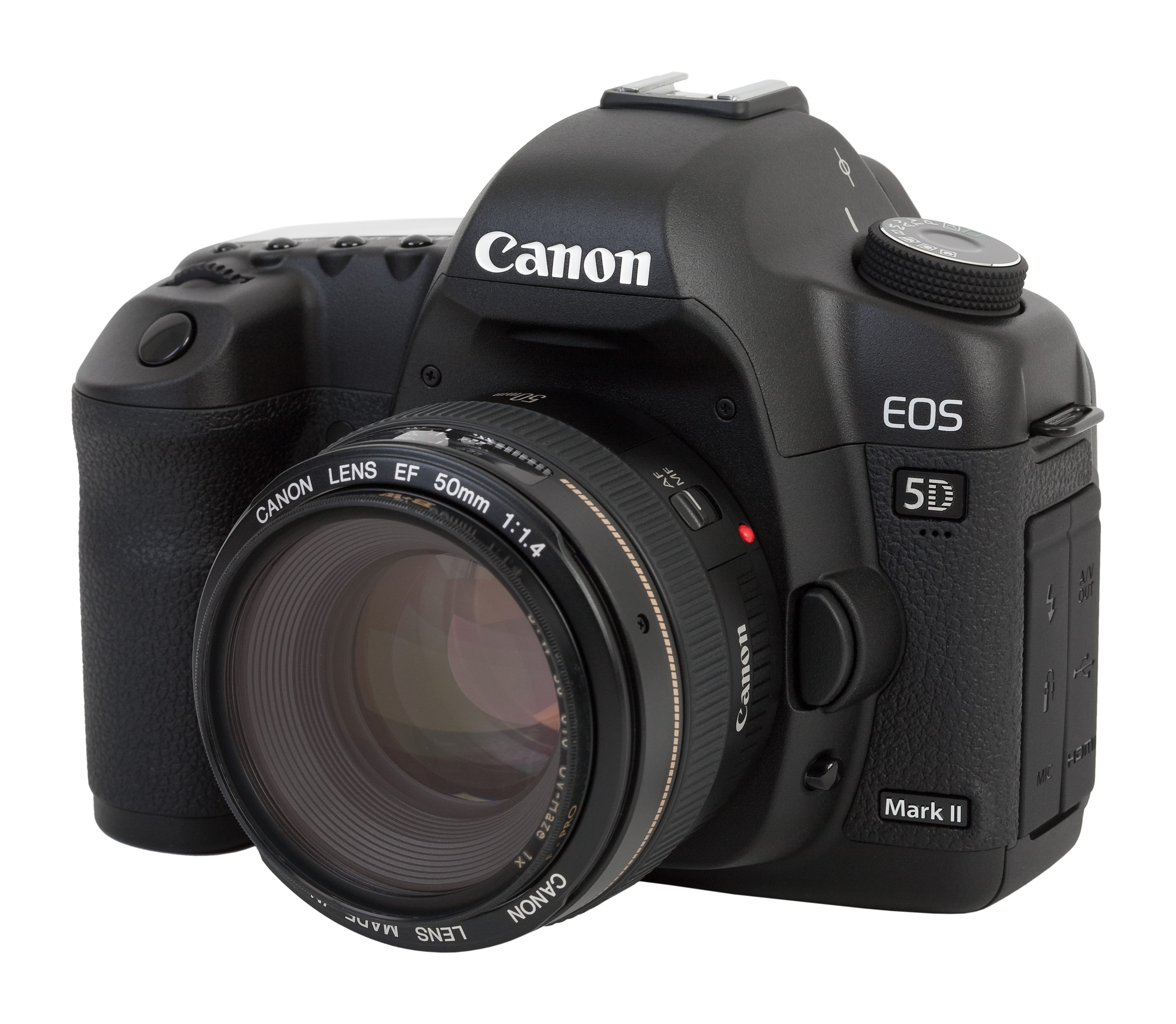
EOS 5D Mark II

See Canon EOS

- Entry level cameras
  - EOS 300D/Digital Rebel/Kiss Digital (discontinued)
  - EOS 350D/Digital Rebel XT/Kiss Digital N (discontinued)
  - EOS 400D/Digital Rebel XTi/Kiss Digital X (discontinued)
  - EOS 450D/Rebel XSi/Kiss X2 (discontinued)
  - EOS 500D/Rebel T1i/Kiss X3 (discontinued)
  - EOS 550D/Rebel T2i/Kiss X4 (discontinued)
  - EOS 600D/Rebel T3i/Kiss X5 (discontinued)
  - EOS 650D/Rebel T4i/Kiss X6i (discontinued)
  - EOS 700D/Rebel T5i/Kiss X7i (discontinued)
  - EOS 750D/Rebel T6i/Kiss X8i (discontinued)
  - EOS 760D/Rebel T6s/8000D (discontinued)
  - EOS 800D/Rebel T7i/Kiss X9i (discontinued)
  - EOS 850D/Rebel T8i/Kiss X10i (discontinued)
  - EOS 100D/Rebel SL1/Kiss X7 (discontinued)
  - EOS 200D/Rebel SL2/Kiss X9 (discontinued)
  - EOS 250D/Rebel SL3/Kiss X10 (discontinued)
  - EOS 1000D/Rebel XS/Kiss F (discontinued)
  - EOS 1100D/Rebel T3/Kiss X50 (discontinued)
  - EOS 1200D/Rebel T5/Kiss X70 (discontinued)
  - EOS 1300D/Rebel T6/Kiss X80 (discontinued)
  - EOS 1500D/EOS 2000D/Rebel T7/Kiss X90
  - EOS 3000D/EOS 4000D/Rebel T100 (discontinued)
- Semi-professional and mid-range cameras
  - EOS D30 (discontinued)
  - EOS D60 (discontinued)
  - EOS 10D (discontinued)
  - EOS 20D (discontinued)
  - EOS 20Da (discontinued) – designed for astrophotography
  - EOS 30D (discontinued)
  - EOS 40D (discontinued)
  - EOS 50D (discontinued)
  - EOS 60D(discontinued)
  - EOS 60Da (discontinued) – designed for astrophotography
  - EOS 70D (discontinued) – introduced Canon's Dual Pixel CMOS Autofocus
  - EOS 77D (discontinued)
  - EOS 80D (discontinued)
  - EOS 90D (discontinued)
- Premium cameras
  - APS-C sensor
    - EOS 7D (discontinued)
    - EOS 7D Mark II (discontinued)
  - Full-frame sensor
    - EOS 5D (discontinued)
    - EOS 5D Mark II (discontinued)
    - EOS 5D Mark III (discontinued)
    - EOS 5D Mark IV (discontinued)
    - EOS 5Ds (discontinued)
    - EOS 5Ds R (discontinued)
    - EOS 6D (discontinued)
    - EOS 6D Mark II (discontinued)
- Professional cameras:
  - EOS-1D (discontinued)
  - EOS-1Ds (discontinued)
  - EOS-1D Mark II (discontinued)
  - EOS-1Ds Mark II (discontinued)
  - EOS-1D Mark II N (discontinued)
  - EOS-1D Mark III (discontinued)
  - EOS-1Ds Mark III (discontinued)
  - EOS-1D Mark IV (discontinued)
  - EOS-1D X (discontinued)
  - EOS-1D X Mark II (discontinued)
  - EOS-1D C (cinema-oriented) (discontinued)
  - EOS-1D X Mark III (discontinued)

=== Mirrorless interchangeable-lens cameras ===
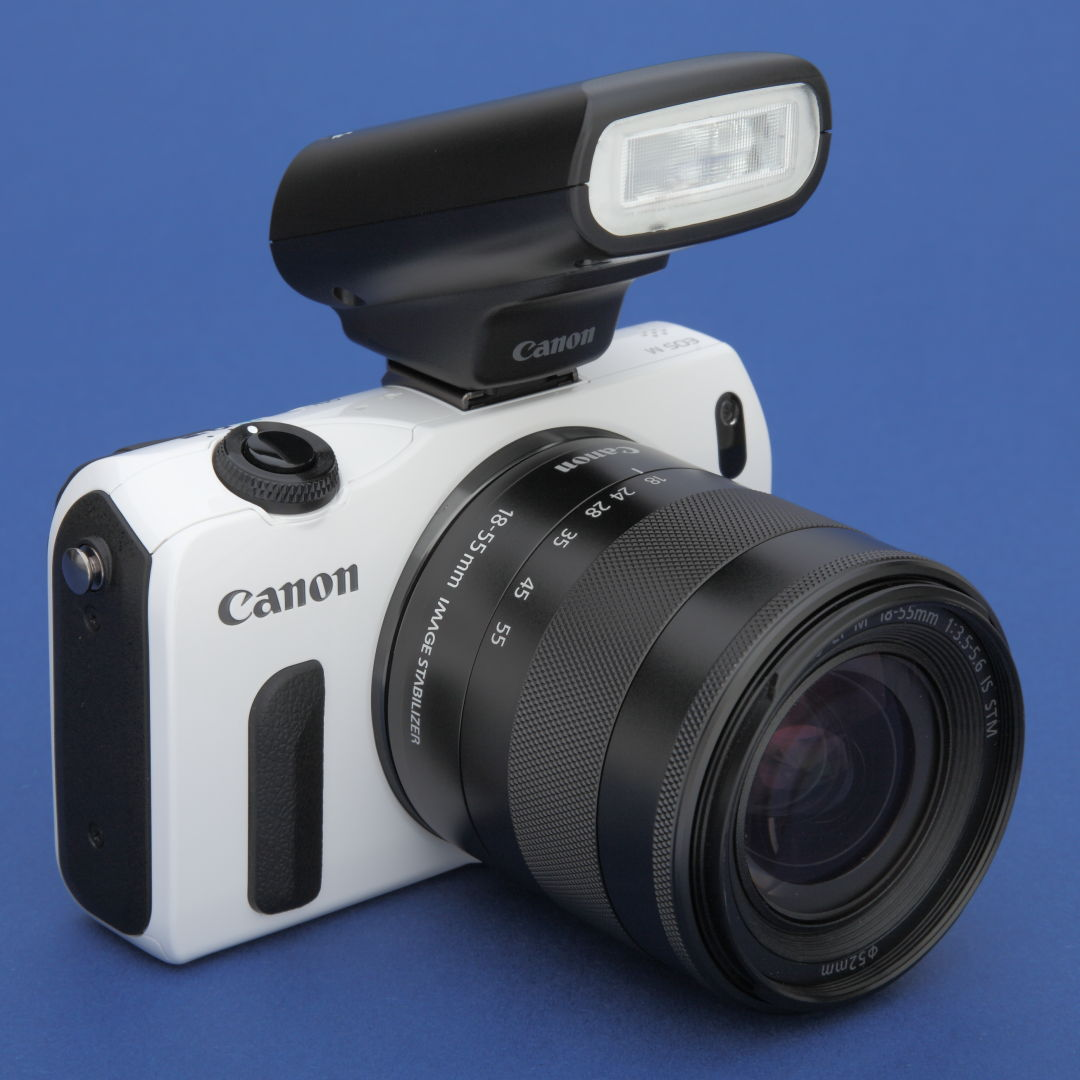
EOS M, Canon's first mirrorless system camera

- APS-C sensor
  - Canon EOS M (discontinued)
  - Canon EOS M2 (discontinued)
  - Canon EOS M3 (discontinued)
  - Canon EOS M10 (discontinued)
  - Canon EOS M5 (discontinued)
  - Canon EOS M6 (discontinued)
  - Canon EOS M6 Mark II (discontinued)
  - Canon EOS M100 (discontinued)
  - Canon EOS M50 (discontinued)
  - Canon EOS M50 Mark II (discontinued)
  - Canon EOS R7
  - Canon EOS R10
  - Canon EOS R50
  - Canon EOS R100
  - Canon EOS R50 V
- Full-frame sensor
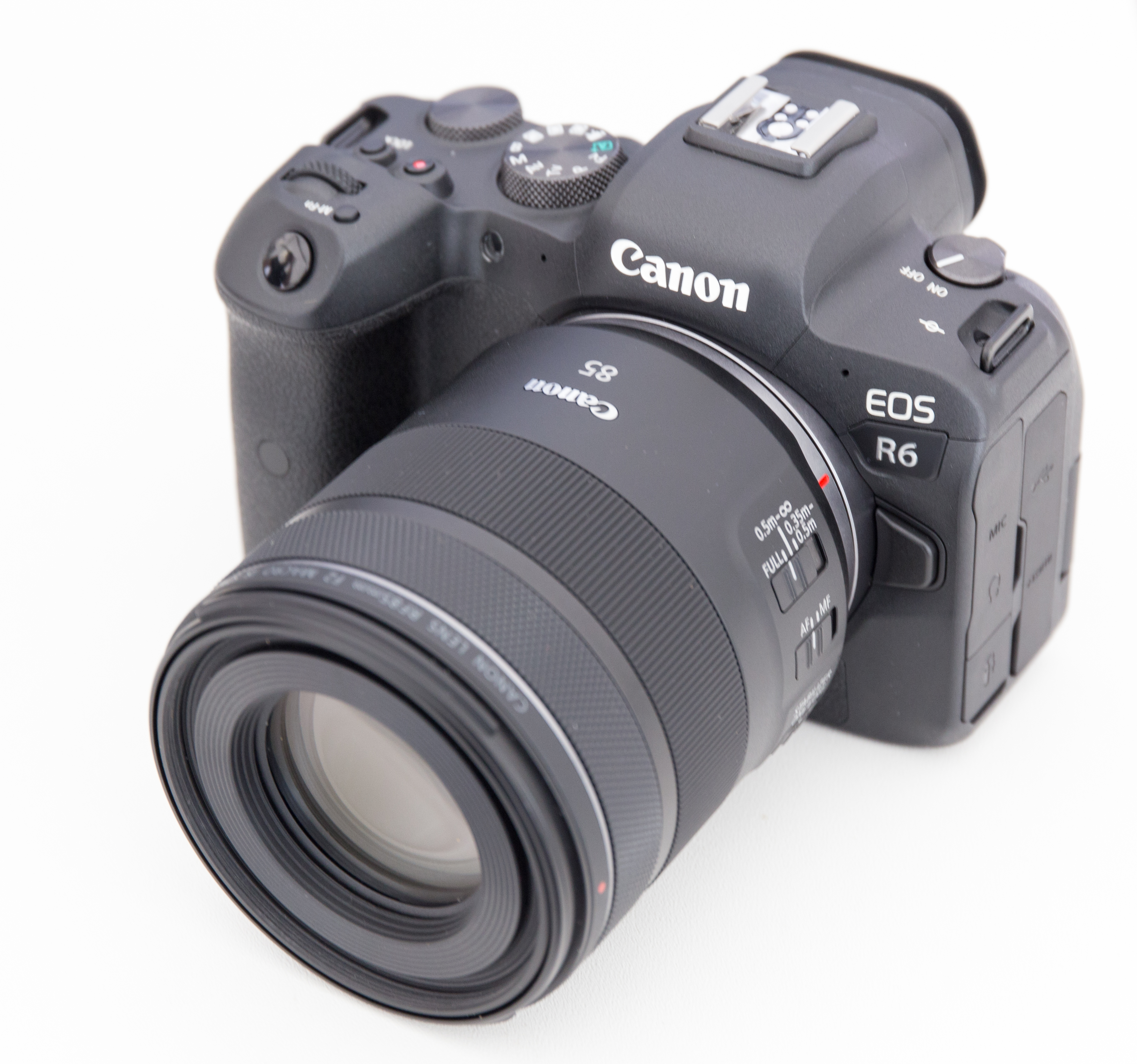
  EOS R6
  - Canon EOS R (discontinued)
  - Canon EOS RP
  - Canon EOS Ra (designed for Astrophotography) (discontinued)
  - Canon EOS R5
  - Canon EOS R5 Mark II
  - Canon EOS R6
  - Canon EOS R6 Mark II
  - Canon EOS R6 Mark III
  - Canon EOS R3
  - Canon EOS R8
  - Canon EOS R8 Mark II
  - Canon EOS R1

=== Cinema EOS cameras ===
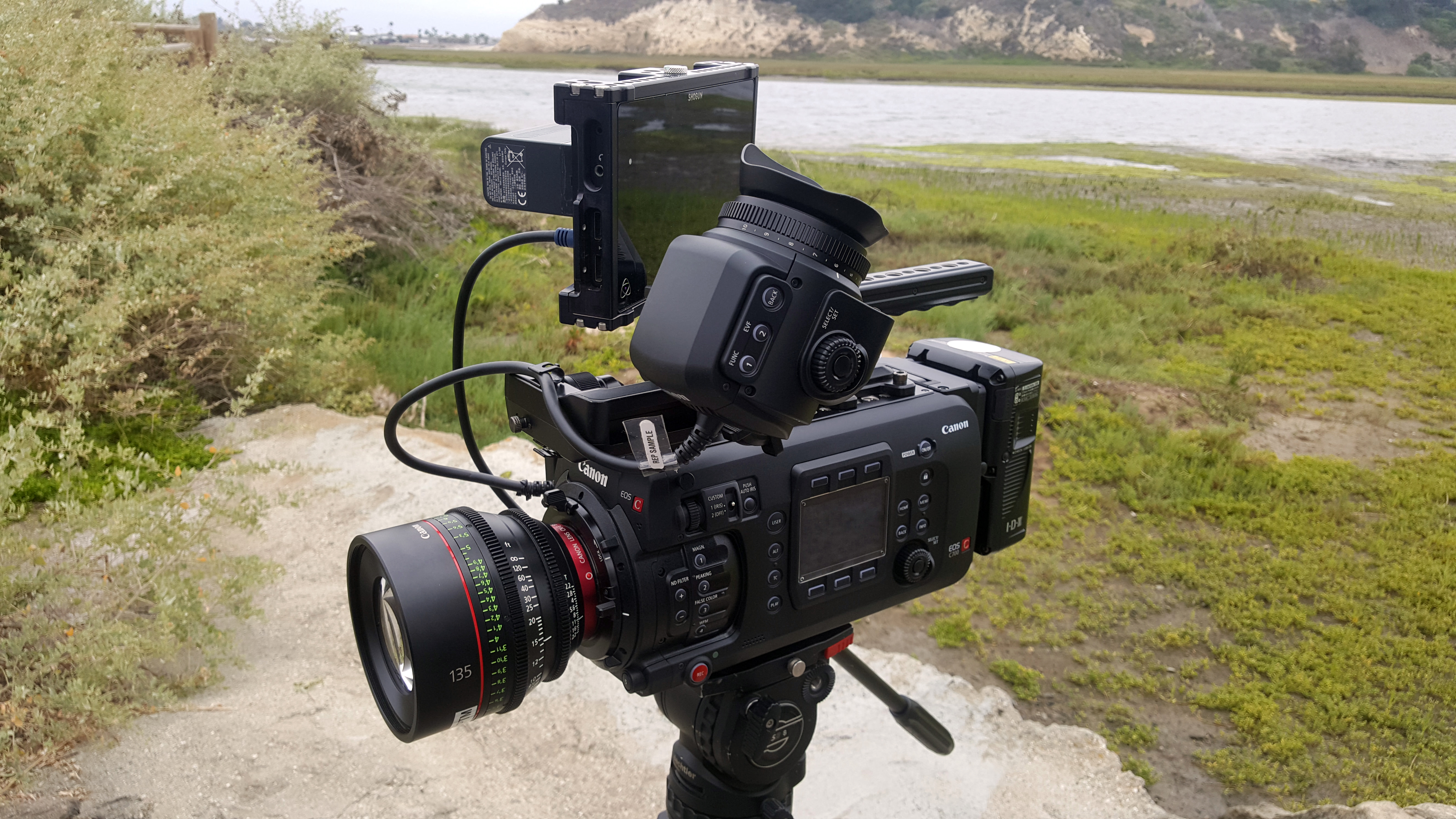
Canon Cinema EOS C700 MultiDyne Camera

Canon Cinema EOS cameras as of December 2025.

- Canon EOS C700 FF
- Canon EOS C700
- Canon EOS C500 Mark II
- Canon EOS C300 Mark III
- Canon EOS C300 Mark II
- Canon EOS C200
- Canon EOS C100 Mark II
- Canon EOS C70
- Canon EOS R5 C – 8K video and 45MP stills; smallest Cinema EOS camera
- Canon EOS C400
- Canon EOS C80
- Canon EOS C50
- Canon EOS 1D-C

=== 35 mm compact cameras ===
==== Prima/Sure Shot/Autoboy series ====
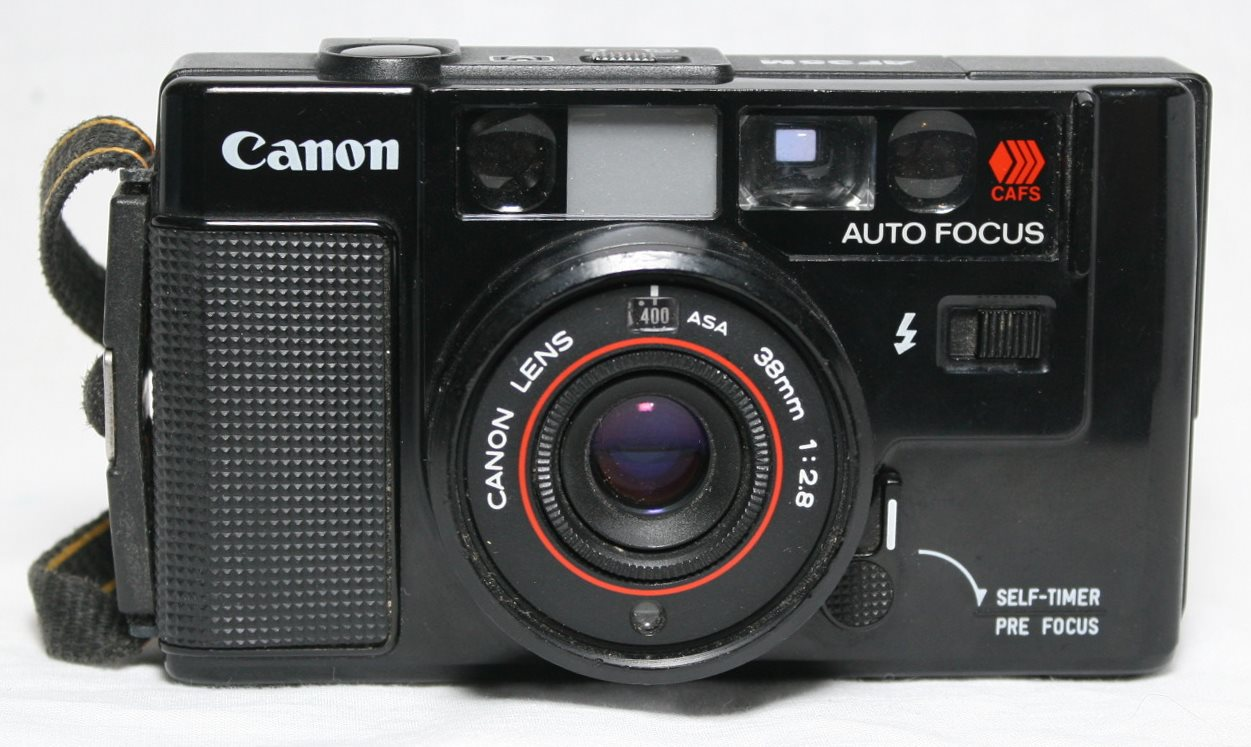
AF35M

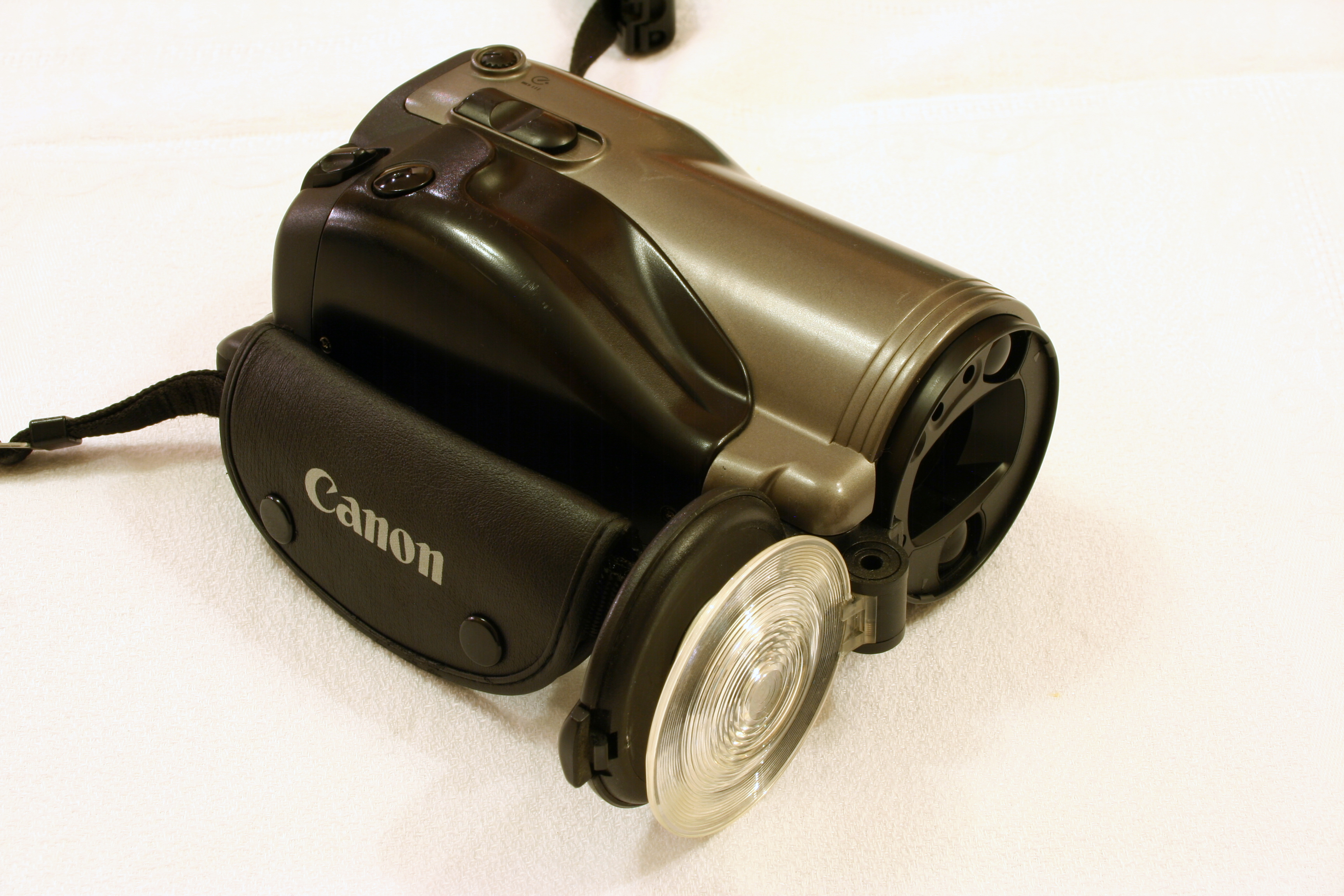
Epoca

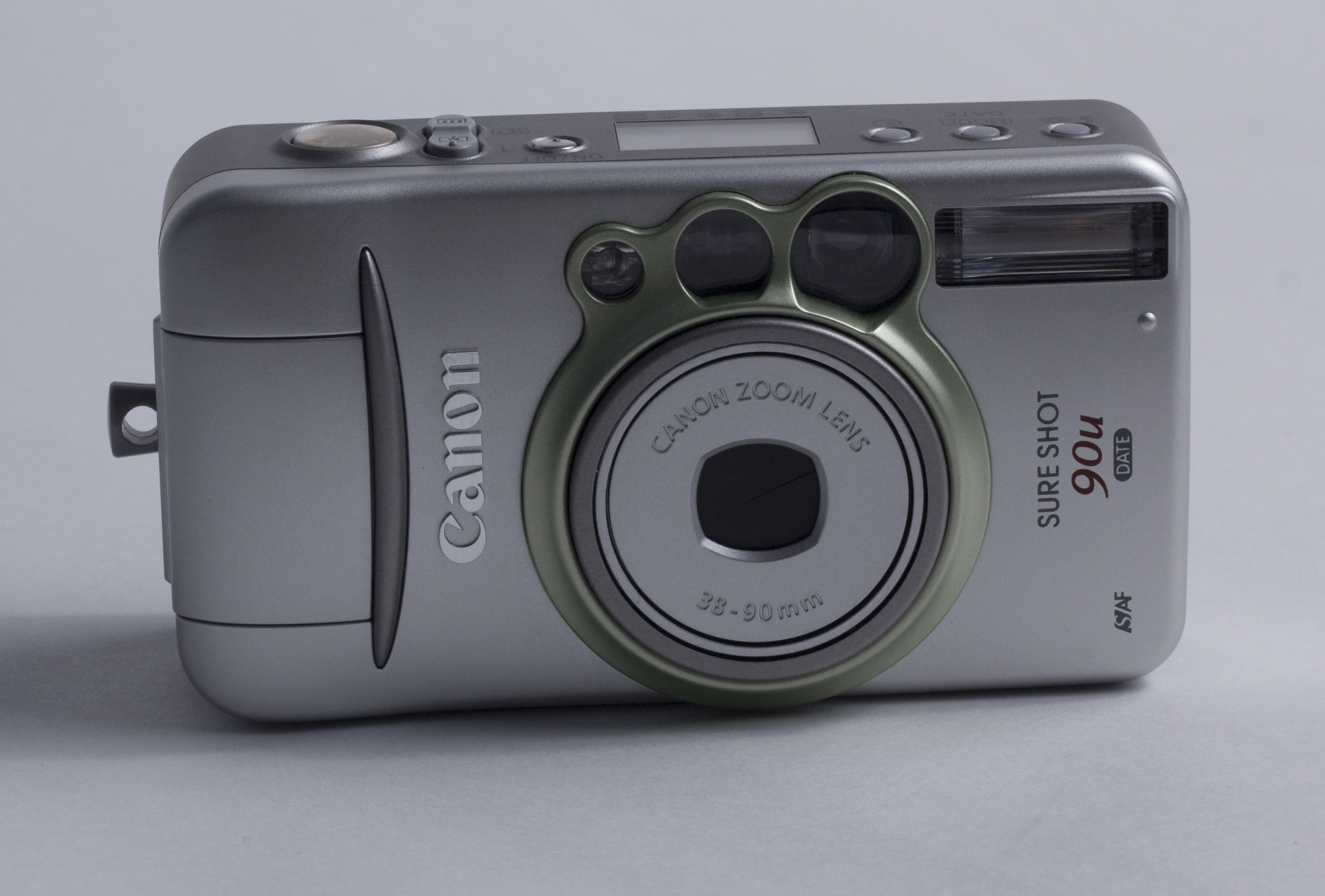
Sure Shot 90u Date

Canon entered the compact camera market with the AF35M in 1979, which spawned a successful line known as Sure Shot in North America and Autoboy in Japan. In 1988, the Prima line was launched for the European and international markets. Canon continued to produce compact film cameras until 2005.

- Canon AF35M/Sure Shot/Autoboy (1979)
- Canon AF35ML/Super Sure Shot/Autoboy Super (1981)
- Canon AF35M II/New Sure Shot/Autoboy 2 (1983)
- Canon AF35J/Sprint/Autoboy Lite (1985)
- Canon Top Twin/Sure Shot Tele/Autoboy Tele (1986)
- Canon Prima Tele/Sure Shot Multi Tele/Autoboy Tele 6 (1988)
- Canon Prima Zoom/Sure Shot Zoom/Autoboy Zoom (1988)
- Canon Prima Shot/Sure Shot Ace/Autoboy Prisma (1988)
- Canon Prima 4/Sure Shot Joy/Autoboy Lite 2 (1988)
- Canon Prima Zoom F/Sure Shot Zoom XL/Autoboy Zoom Super (1989)
- Canon Sure Shot Caption Zoom/New Autoboy (1989)
- Canon Prima Auto Zoom/Sure Shot Zoom S (1989)
- Canon Epoca/Photura/Autoboy Jet (1990)
- Canon Prima Zoom 105/Sure Shot Mega Zoom 105/Autoboy Zoom 105 (1991)
- Canon Prima Zoom 76/Sure Shot Mega Zoom 76/Autoboy Zoom 76 (1991)
- Canon Prima 5/Sure Shot Max/Autoboy Mini (1991)
- Canon Epoca 135/Photura 135/Jet 135 (1992)
- Canon Prima Zoom Mini/Sure Shot Zoom Max/Autoboy A (1992)
- Canon Autoboy A XL (1993)
- Canon Prima Super 115/Sure Shot Z115/Autoboy S (1993)
- Canon Prima Mini/Sure Shot M/Autoboy F (1993)
- Canon Prima Super 85/Sure Shot Z85/Autoboy J (1994)
- Canon Prima AF-7/Sure Shot AF-7/Sure Shot Owl (1994)
- Canon Prima AS-1/Sure Shot A-1/Autoboy D5 (1994)
- Canon Prima Super 28V/Autoboy Luna (1994)
- Canon Prima Junior AF/AF 32 (1995)
- Canon Prima Sol/Sure Shot Delsol/Autoboy SE (1995)
- Canon Prima Zoom Shoot/Sure Shot 60 Zoom/Autoboy Juno (1995)
- Canon Prima Super 28/Sure Shot Z70W (1995)
- Canon Prima Zoom 70F/Sure Shot 70 Zoom/Autoboy Luna 35 (1995)
- Canon Prima BF Twin/Sure Shot 80 Tele/Autoboy BF80 (1995)
- Canon Prima Super 135/Sure Shot Z135/Autoboy S II (1996)
- Canon Prima Mini II/Sure Shot Sleek/Autoboy F XL (1996)
- Canon Prima AF-8 Date/Sure Shot Owl Date (1997)
- Canon Prima Super 105/Sure Shot 105 Zoom Date/Autoboy Luna 105 (1997)
- Canon Prima Zoom 85 Date/Sure Shot Zoom 85 Date/Autoboy Luna 85 (1998)
- Canon Autoboy Luna XL (1999)
- Canon Prima Super 28N Caption (1999)
- Canon Prima Super 115N Caption/Sure Shot Z115 Panorama Caption/Autoboy S XL (1999)
- Canon Prima Super 135N Caption/Sure Shot Z135 Caption/Autoboy SII XL (1999)
- Canon Prima Super 120 Caption/Sure Shot Classic 120 Caption/Autoboy 120 (1999)
- Canon Prima Zoom 76 Date/Sure Shot 76 Zoom Date/Autoboy Juno 76 (2000)
- Canon Prima Super Wide 90 Caption/Sure Shot Z90W Caption/Autoboy Epo (2000)
- Canon Prima AF9 S Date/Sure Shot Owl PF (2000)
- Canon Prima BF-9S Date/BF Date (2000)
- Canon Prima Zoom 65 Date (2001)
- Canon Prima Super 105X Date/Sure Shot 105 Zoom S Date/Autoboy Luna 105 S (2001)
- Canon Prima Zoom 60 QD (2001)
- Canon Prima Super 155/Sure Shot Z155/Autoboy 155 (2002)
- Canon Prima Super 130/Sure Shot 130u/Autoboy N130 (2002)
- Canon Prima BF800 Zoom (2002)
- Canon Prima Super 115u/Sure Shot 115u/Autoboy N115 (2003)
- Canon Prima Super 105u/Sure Shot 105u/Autoboy N105 (2003)
- Canon Prima Zoom 80u/Sure Shot 80u/Autoboy N80 (2003)
- Canon Prima BF-10 (Date)/Sure Shot BF-10 (Date) (2003)
- Canon Prima 90u/Sure Shot 90u (2003)
- Canon Prima AF-10 (Date)/Sure Shot AF-10 (Date) (2003)
- Canon Prima Super 150u/Sure Shot 150u/Autoboy N150 (2004)
- Canon Prima Super 180/Sure Shot Z180u/Autoboy 180 (2004)
- Canon Prima Super 130u Date/Sure Shot Z130u Date/Autoboy N130 II (2005)
- Canon Prima Zoom 115u II Date/Sure Shot 115u II Date (2005)
- Canon Prima Zoom 90u II Date/Sure Shot 90u II Date (2005)

==== Snappy series ====
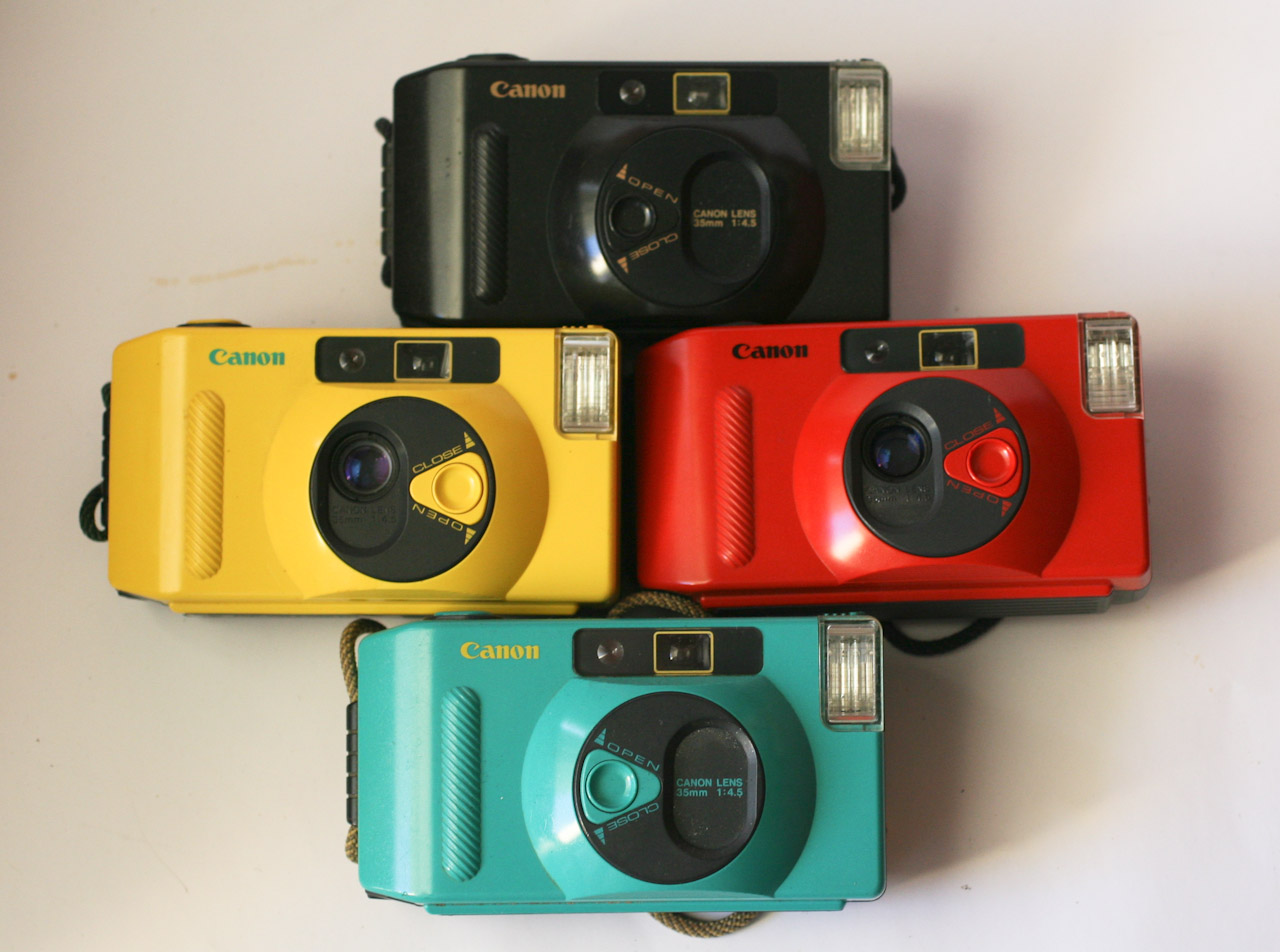
Snappy S

In 1982, Canon released the Snappy 50 as a smaller and more affordable alternative to the Autoboy/Sure Shot line. The Snappy sub-brand was used globally until 1988, when several models were released in Europe and most international markets under the Prima line.

- Canon Snappy 50 (1982)
- Canon Snappy 20 (1982)
- Canon Snappy S S-30FF (1985)
- Canon AS-6/Aqua Snappy/Acty (1986)
- Canon Snappy EZ/Prima Junior/CB35 (1988)
- Canon Snappy Q/Sketchbook (1989)
- Canon Snappy AF (1989)
- Canon Snappy V/Prima Junior HI (1989)
- Canon Snappy LX/Prima BF/BF35 (1992)
- Canon Snappy EL/Prima Junior/CB35M (1992)
- Canon Snappy EX/Prima Junior CX (1993)
- Canon Snappy LX Date/Prima BF-7 Date/BF35 QDM (1994)
- Canon New Snappy EL/Prima Junior DX/CB32QD (1994)
- Canon Snappy QT Date/Prima BF-80 Date (1997)
- Canon Snappy LX II Date/Prima BF-8 Date/BF-35D (1998)

==== Canon MC ====
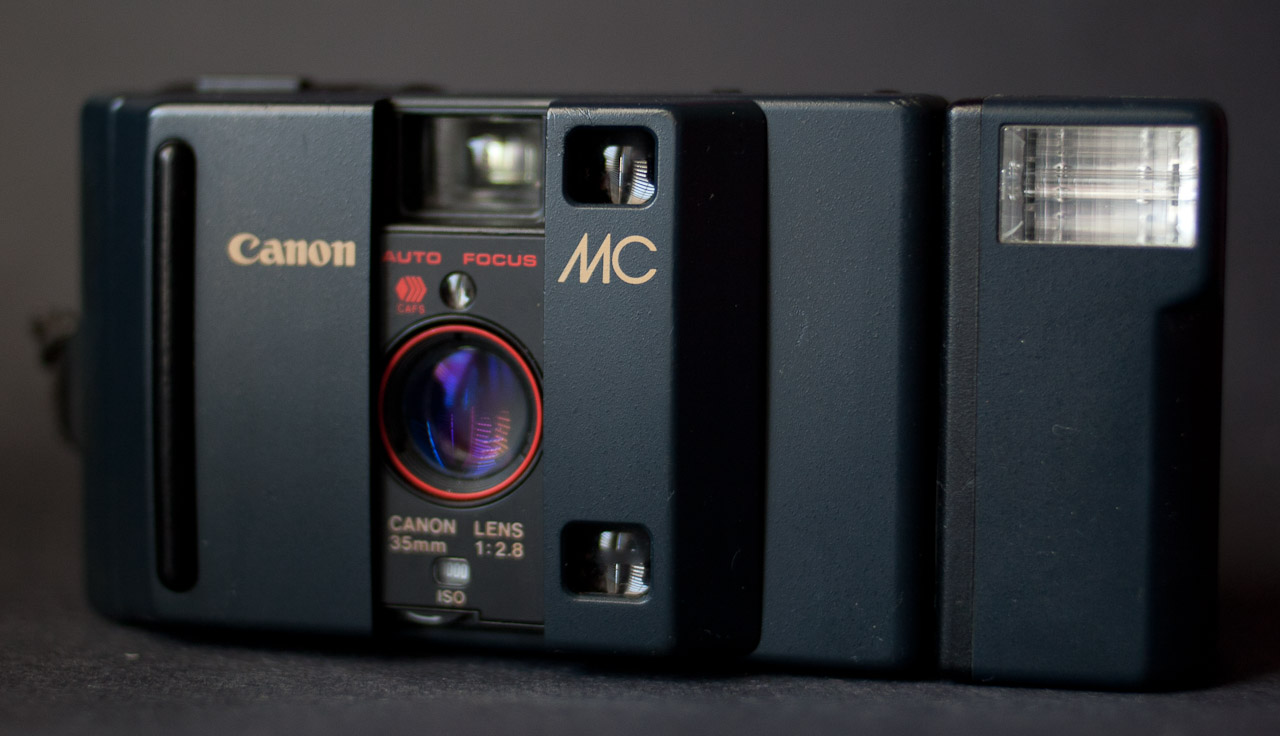
MC

Released in 1984, the MC ("Micro Compact") was a higher-end compact camera made with emphasis on compactness and build quality. The camera does not have a built-in flash; instead, it can be equipped with the optional Speedlite MC-S flash unit.

- Canon MC/MC QD (1984)
- Canon MC 10 (1985)

==== Canon LA ====
In 1993, Canon released the low-cost LA camera for emerging markets.

- Canon LA 10 (1993; Central America/South America/Australia)
- Canon LA 20 (1994; Europe/Asia)

=== 35 mm compact half-format cameras 18×24 mm ===
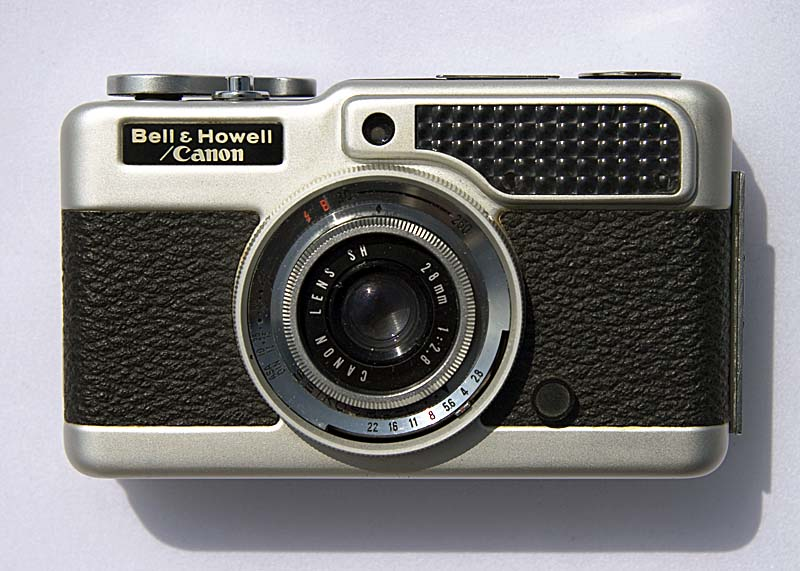
Demi

- Demi (Feb 1963)
- Dial 35 (clockwork winder) (Nov 1963)
- Demi S (Sep 1964)
- Demi C (Apr 1965)
- Demi EE17 (May 1966)
- Demi EE28 (Apr 1967)
- Dial 35-2 (Apr 1968)
- Demi Rapid (Jun 1965) Agfa Cassette
- Dial Rapid (Oct 1965) Agfa Cassette

=== 35 mm rangefinder cameras ===
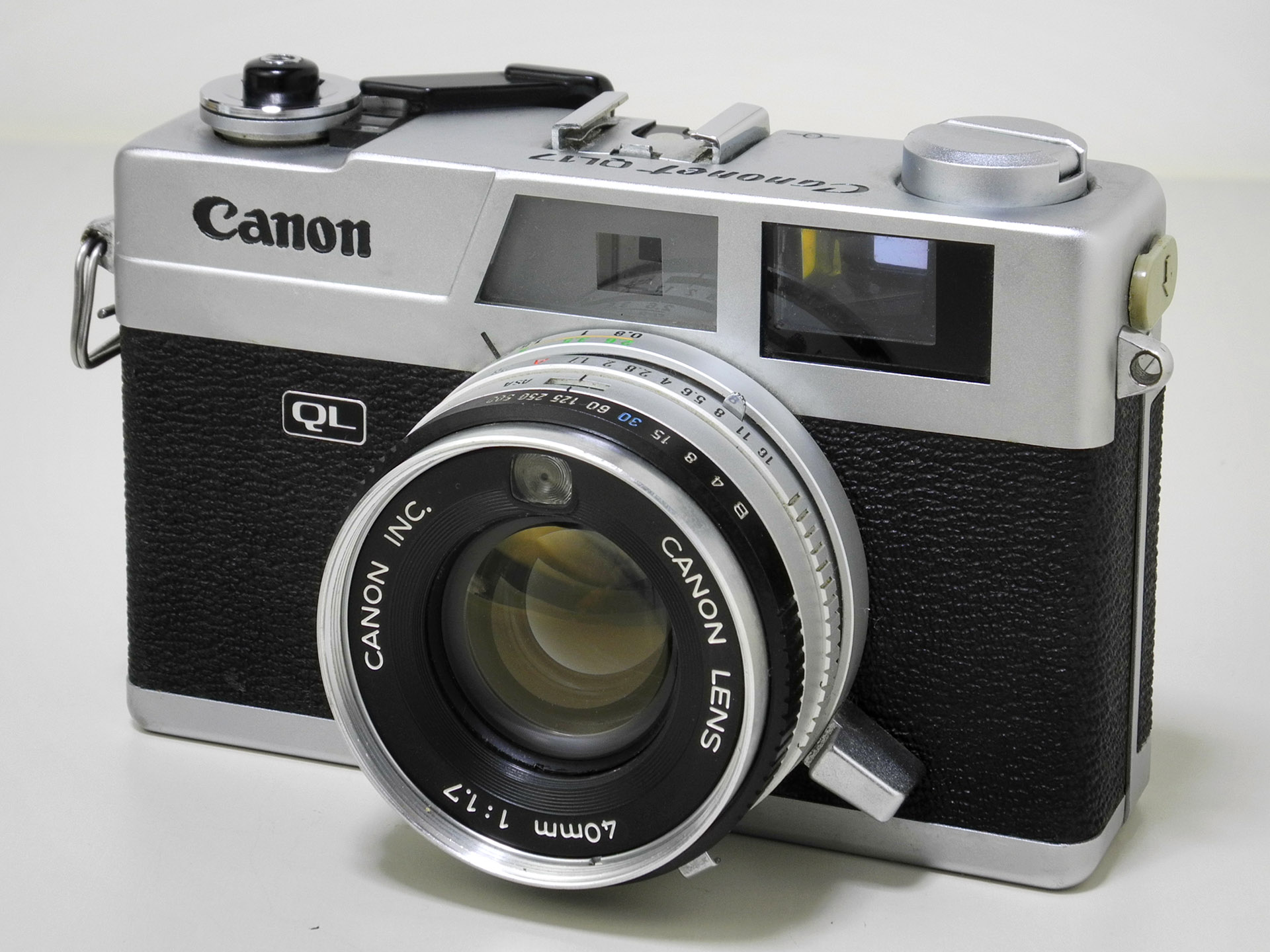
Canonet QL17

- Canon II (1949)
- Canon VT (1956)
- Canon P (1959)
- Canonet (1961)
- Canon 7 (1961)
- Canonet S (1964)
- Canonet QL17, QL19, QL19E and QL25 (1965)
- Canonet 28 (1968)
- Canonet QL17 new (1969) and QL17-L new (1970)
- Canonet 28 new (1971), QL19 new (1971)
- Canonet G-III QL17 (1972), G-III 19 (1972)
- Canon A35F (1978)

=== 110 mm cameras ===
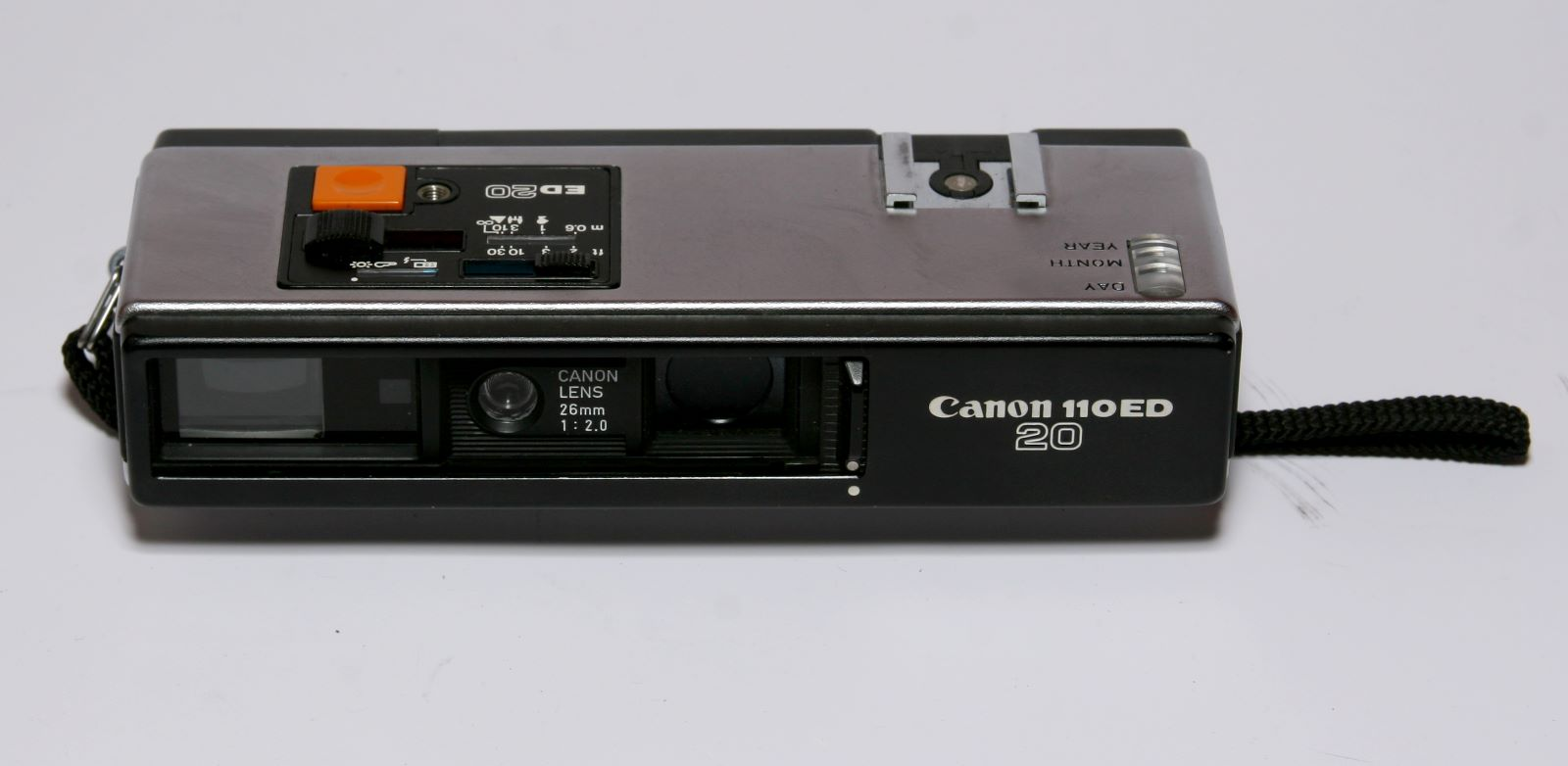
110ED 20

- Canon 110ED (1975)
- Canon 110E (1975)
- Canon 110ED 20 (1977)

=== 8 mm cameras ===
==== Regular 8 mm cameras ====
- Cine 8-S (1956), not sold to the public
- Cine 8-T (1956)
- Reflex Zoom 8 (1959)
- Reflex Zoom 8-2 (1961)
- Reflex Zoom 8-3 (1962)
- Motor Zoom 8 EEE (1962)
- Cine Canonet 8 (1963)
- Cine Zoom 512 (1964)

==== Single 8 mm cameras ====
- Single 8 518 (1965)
- Single 8 518 SV (1970)

==== Super 8 mm cameras ====
Components of Canosound 514XL-S
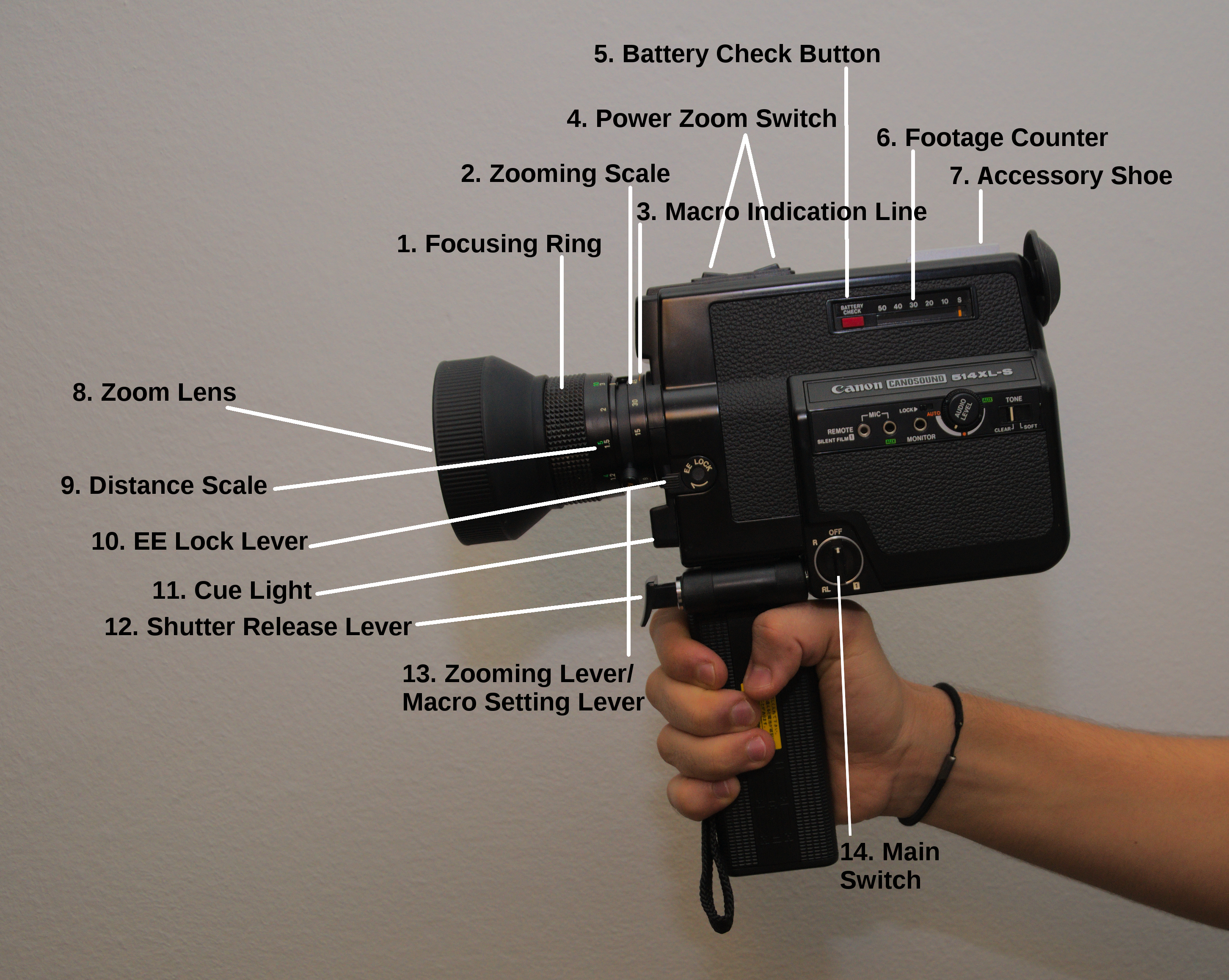
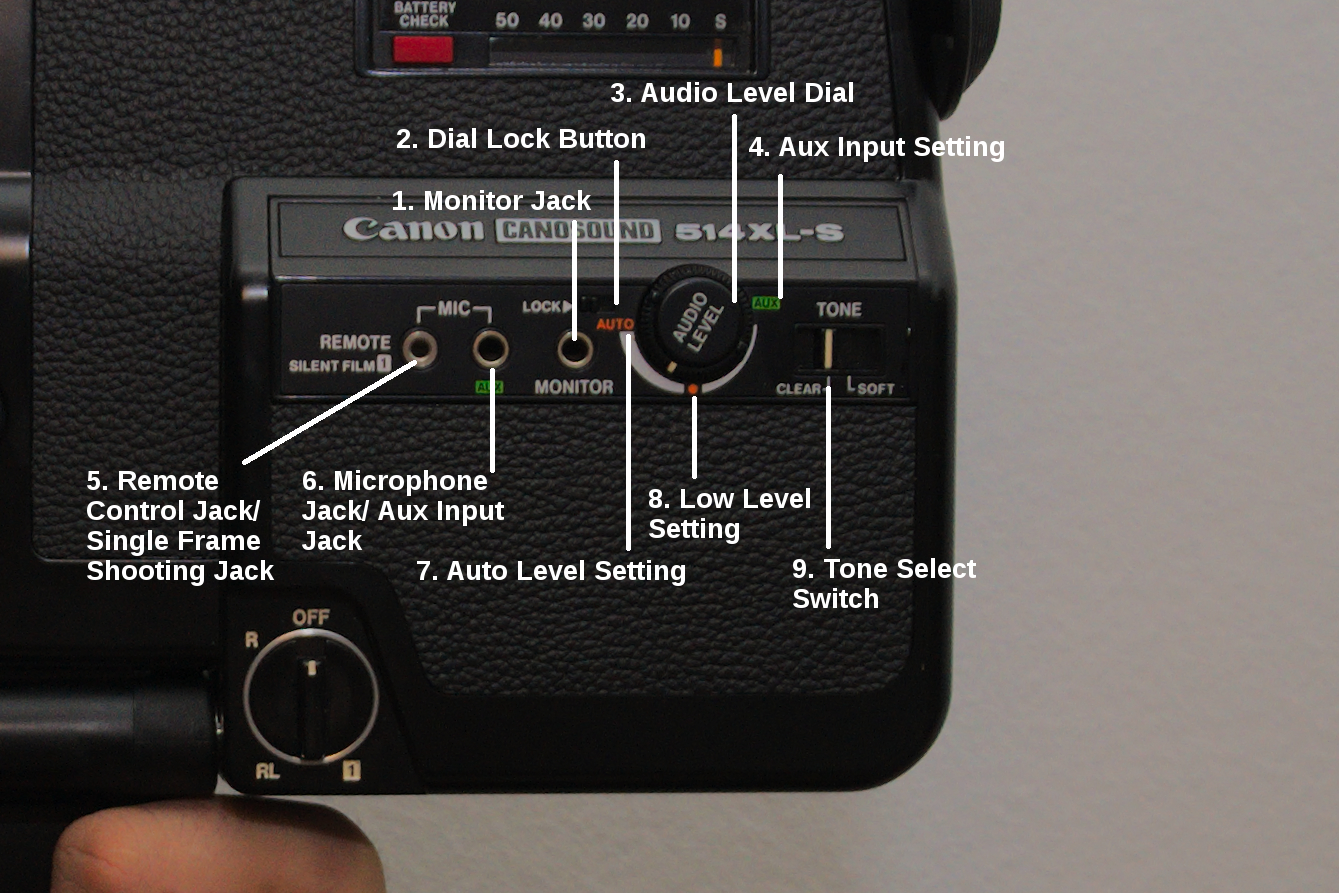
- 1014 XL-S Canosound
- 814 XL-S Canosound
- Autozoom 1218 Super 8 (1968)
- Zoom 250 Super 8 (1969)
- Autozoom 1014 Electronic (1973)
- 310 XL (1975)
- 312 XL-S (1977)
- AF 310 XL (1982)
- AF 310 XL-S (1982)
- Zoom 318 Super 8 (1965)
- Autozoom 318M (1972)
- Zoom 318 Super 8 MB
- Autozoom 512 XL Electronic (1975)
- Autozoom 514 XL Electronic
- 514 XL-S (1976)
- AF 514 XL-S (1980)
- Autozoom 518 SV (1971)
- Autozoom 518 Super 8 (1967)
- Zoom 518 Super 8 (1964)
- Autozoom 814 Super 8 (1967)
- Autozoom 814 Electronic (1972)
- 814 XL Electronic (1977)
- Zoom DS8 (1970)

==== 16mm cameras ====
- Scoopic 16 (1965)
- Scoopic 16M (1973)
- Scoopic 16MN (1974)
- Scoopic 16MS (1977)
- Sound Scoopic 100 (1970)
- Sound Scoopic 200 (1970)
- Sound Scoopic 200S (1972)
- Sound Scoopic 200SE (1972)
- Sound Scoopic 200 S10 (1972)
- Systema Sound 16 (1979)

=== Digital compact cameras ===
==== IXUS/IXY/PowerShot ELPH series ====
- Sold as PowerShot Digital ELPH in US and Canada
- Sold as IXY Digital in Japan
- Sold as Digital IXUS in Europe and Southeast Asia

US names listed

- Canon powerShot S45
- Canon PowerShot S100
- Canon PowerShot S110
- Canon PowerShot S200
- Canon PowerShot S230
- Canon PowerShot S300
- Canon PowerShot S330
- Canon PowerShot S400
- Canon PowerShot S410
- Canon PowerShot S500
- Canon PowerShot SD10
- Canon PowerShot SD20
- Canon PowerShot SD30
- Canon PowerShot SD40
- Canon PowerShot SD100
- Canon PowerShot SD110
- Canon PowerShot SD200
- Canon PowerShot SD300
- Canon PowerShot SD400
- Canon PowerShot SD430
- Canon PowerShot SD450
- Canon PowerShot SD500
- Canon PowerShot SD550
- Canon PowerShot SD600
- Canon PowerShot SD630
- Canon PowerShot SD700 IS
- Canon PowerShot SD750
- Canon PowerShot SD770 IS
- Canon PowerShot SD780 IS
- Canon PowerShot SD790 IS
- Canon PowerShot SD800 IS
- Canon PowerShot SD850 IS
- Canon PowerShot SD870 IS
- Canon PowerShot SD880 IS
- Canon PowerShot SD890 IS
- Canon PowerShot SD900
- Canon PowerShot SD940 IS
- Canon PowerShot SD950 IS
- Canon PowerShot SD960 IS
- Canon PowerShot SD970 IS
- Canon PowerShot SD980 IS
- Canon PowerShot SD990 IS
- Canon PowerShot SD1000
- Canon PowerShot SD1100 IS
- Canon PowerShot SD1200 IS
- Canon PowerShot SD1300 IS
- Canon PowerShot SD1400 IS
- Canon PowerShot SD3500 IS
- Canon PowerShot SD4000 IS
- Canon PowerShot SD4500 IS
- Canon PowerShot 110 HS
- Canon PowerShot 320 HS
- Canon PowerShot 340 HS
- Canon PowerShot 520 HS

==== Canon PowerShot digital cameras ====
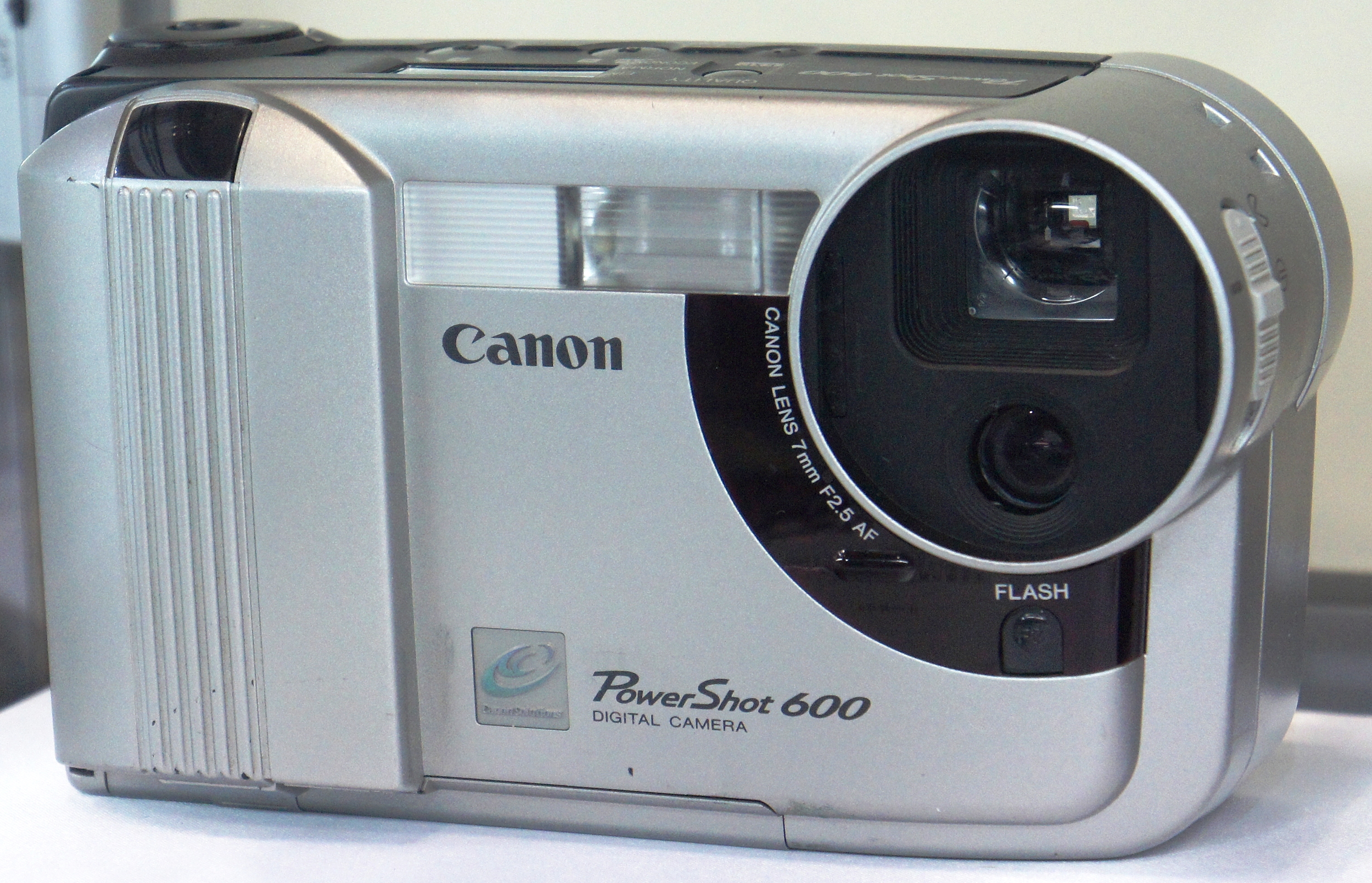
Canon Powershot 600, Canon's first consumer digital camera, released in 1996

- Canon PowerShot 600

===== PowerShot A series =====
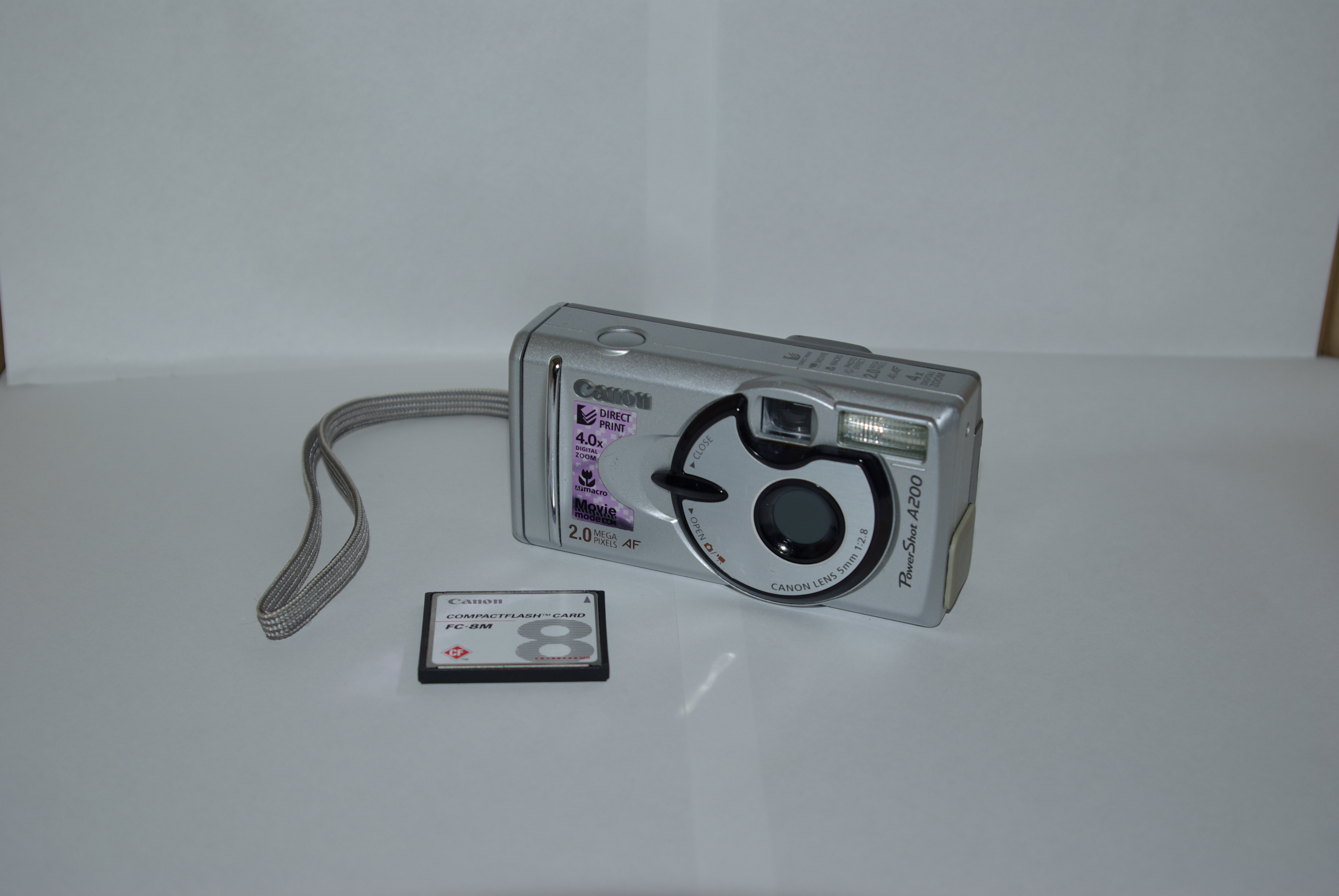
A Canon Powershot A200

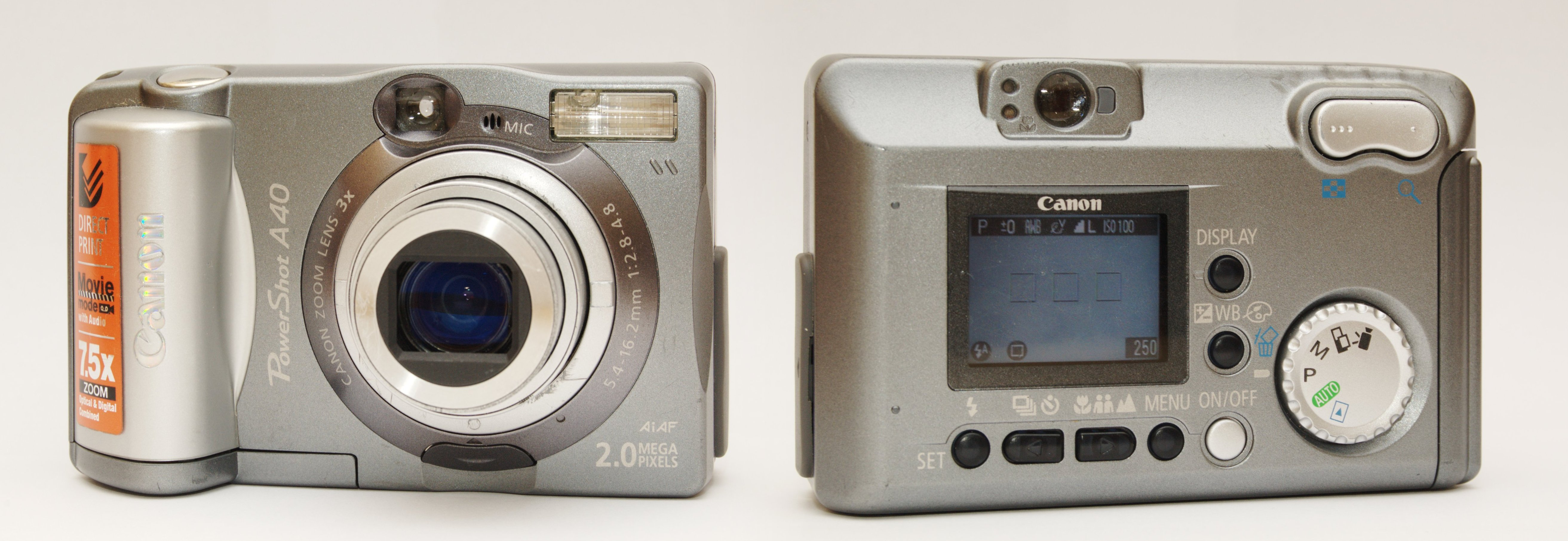
A Canon Powershot A40.

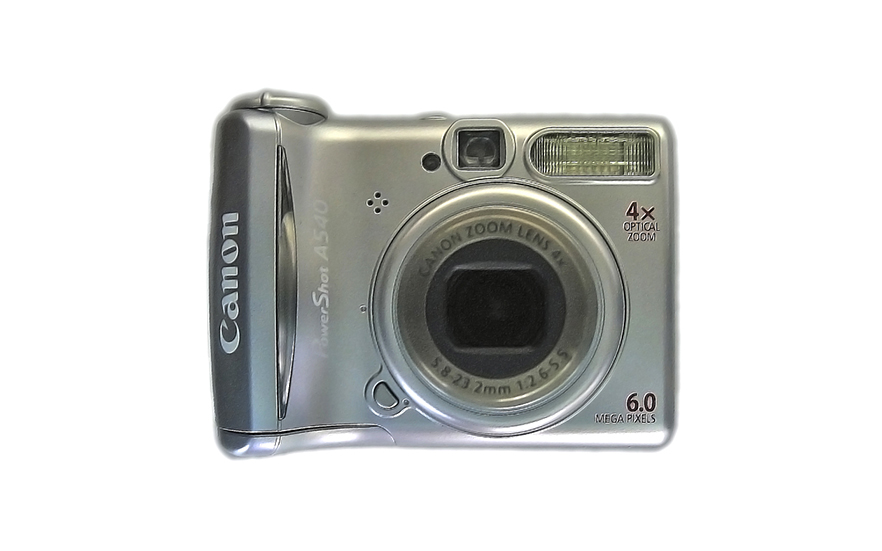
Canon Powershot A540, photographed using itself and a mirror.

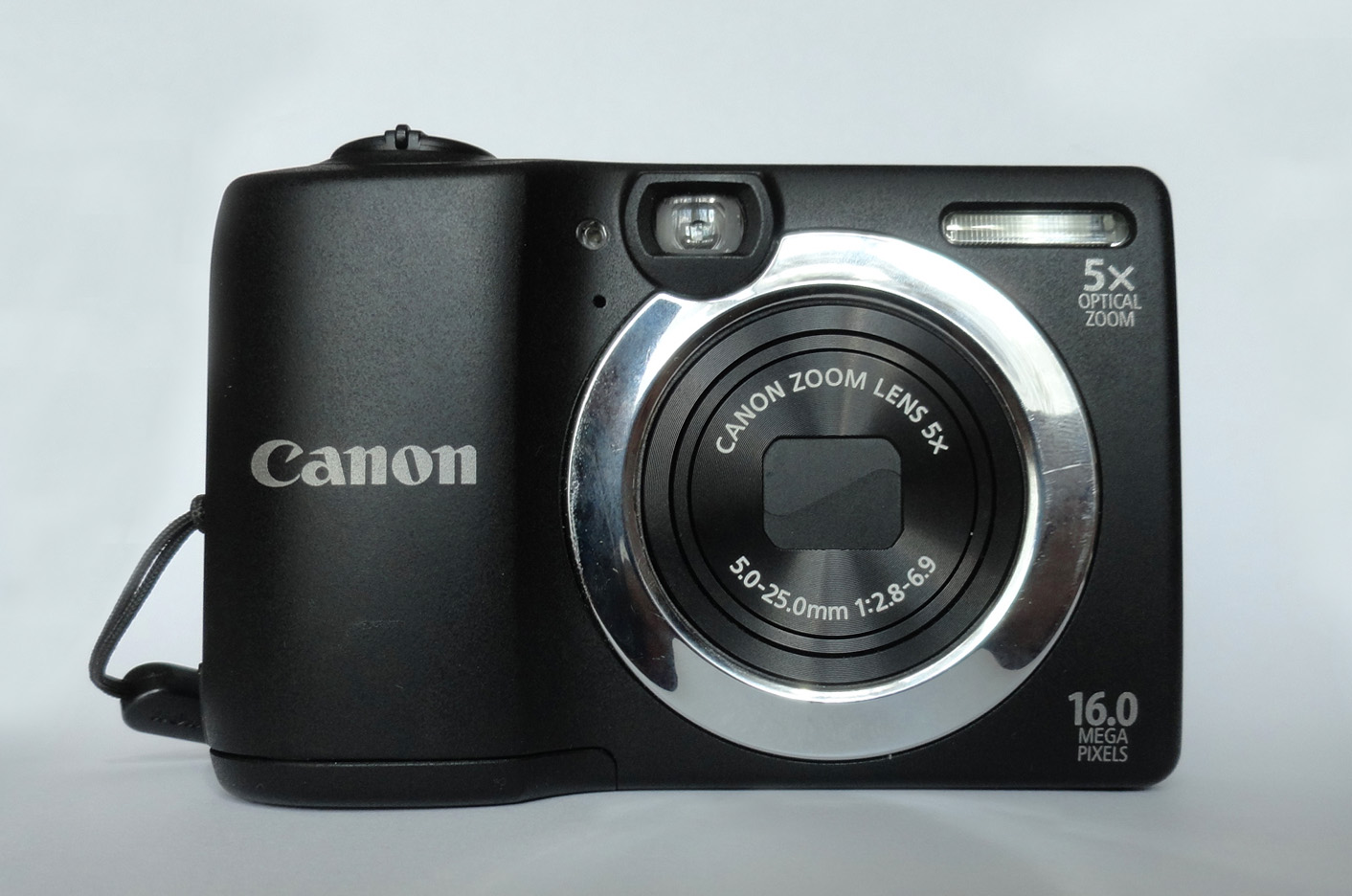
Canon PowerShot A1400

- Canon PowerShot A5
- Canon PowerShot A5 Zoom
- Canon PowerShot A50
- Canon PowerShot A10
- Canon PowerShot A20
- Canon PowerShot A30
- Canon PowerShot A40
- Canon PowerShot A60
- Canon PowerShot A70
- Canon PowerShot A75
- Canon PowerShot A80
- Canon PowerShot A85
- Canon PowerShot A95
- Canon PowerShot A100
- Canon PowerShot A200
- Canon PowerShot A300
- Canon PowerShot A310
- Canon PowerShot A400
- Canon PowerShot A410
- Canon PowerShot A420
- Canon PowerShot A430
- Canon PowerShot A450
- Canon PowerShot A460
- Canon PowerShot A470
- Canon PowerShot A480
- Canon PowerShot A490/A495
- Canon PowerShot A510
- Canon PowerShot A520
- Canon PowerShot A530
- Canon PowerShot A540
- Canon PowerShot A550
- Canon PowerShot A560
- Canon PowerShot A570 IS
- Canon PowerShot A580
- Canon PowerShot A590 IS
- Canon PowerShot A610
- Canon PowerShot A620
- Canon PowerShot A630
- Canon PowerShot A640
- Canon PowerShot A650 IS
- Canon PowerShot A700
- Canon PowerShot A710 IS
- Canon PowerShot A720 IS
- Canon PowerShot A800
- Canon PowerShot A810
- Canon PowerShot A1000 IS
- Canon PowerShot A1100 IS
- Canon PowerShot A1200
- Canon PowerShot A1300
- Canon PowerShot A1400
- Canon PowerShot A2000 IS
- Canon PowerShot A2200
- Canon PowerShot A2300 HD
- Canon PowerShot A2500
- Canon PowerShot A2600
- Canon PowerShot A3000 IS
- Canon PowerShot A3100 I
- Canon PowerShot A3150 IS
- Canon PowerShot A3200 IS
- Canon PowerShot A3300 IS
- Canon Powershot A3400 IS
- Canon Powershot A3500 IS
- Canon Powershot A4000 IS

===== PowerShot D series =====
- Canon PowerShot D10
- Canon PowerShot D20
- Canon PowerShot D30

===== PowerShot E series =====
- Canon PowerShot E1

===== PowerShot G series =====
- Canon PowerShot G1
- Canon PowerShot G2
- Canon PowerShot G3
- Canon PowerShot G5
- Canon PowerShot G6
- Canon PowerShot G7
- Canon PowerShot G9
- Canon PowerShot G10
- Canon PowerShot G11
- Canon PowerShot G12
- Canon PowerShot G15
- Canon PowerShot G16
- Canon PowerShot G1 X
- Canon PowerShot G1 X MkII
- Canon PowerShot G1 X MkIII
- Canon PowerShot G3 X
- Canon PowerShot G5 X
- Canon PowerShot G5 X MkII
- Canon PowerShot G7 X
- Canon PowerShot G7 X MkII
- Canon PowerShot G7 X MkIII
- Canon PowerShot G9 X
- Canon PowerShot G9 X MkII

===== PowerShot N series =====
- Canon PowerShot N100, has also rear-facing lens as smartphone, but front and rear lenses both together will take photo/video when the shutter is pressed and the rear lens image will appear in the corner of the big image from front lens as picture-in-picture, so the camera is called as a 'Story Camera'

===== PowerShot Pro series =====
- Canon Powershot Pro1
- Canon Powershot Pro7d
- Canon Powershot Pro90 IS

===== PowerShot S series =====
- Canon PowerShot S1 IS
- Canon PowerShot S2 IS
- Canon PowerShot S3 IS
- Canon PowerShot S5 IS
- Canon PowerShot S10
- Canon PowerShot S20
- Canon PowerShot S30
- Canon PowerShot S40
- Canon PowerShot S45
- Canon PowerShot S50
- Canon PowerShot S60
- Canon PowerShot S70
- Canon PowerShot S80
- Canon PowerShot S90
- Canon PowerShot S95
- Canon PowerShot S100
- Canon PowerShot S110
- Canon PowerShot S120
- Canon PowerShot SX1 IS
- Canon PowerShot SX10 IS
- Canon PowerShot SX20 IS
- Canon PowerShot SX30 IS
- Canon PowerShot SX40 HS
- Canon PowerShot SX50 HS
- Canon PowerShot SX60 HS
- Canon PowerShot SX70 HS
- Canon PowerShot SX100 IS
- Canon PowerShot SX110 IS
- Canon PowerShot SX120 IS
- Canon PowerShot SX130 IS
- Canon PowerShot SX150 IS
- Canon PowerShot SX160 IS
- Canon PowerShot SX200 IS
- Canon PowerShot SX210 IS
- Canon PowerShot SX220 HS
- Canon PowerShot SX230 HS (features GPS)
- Canon PowerShot SX240 HS
- Canon PowerShot SX260 HS (features GPS)
- Canon PowerShot SX270 HS
- Canon PowerShot SX280 HS (features GPS)
- Canon PowerShot SX400 IS
- Canon PowerShot SX410 IS
- Canon PowerShot SX420 IS

(first PowerShot camera with built-in Wi-Fi)

- Canon PowerShot SX430 IS

(not officially sold in North America)

- Canon PowerShot SX500 IS
- Canon PowerShot SX510 HS
- Canon PowerShot SX520 HS
- Canon PowerShot SX530 HS
- Canon PowerShot SX540 HS
- Canon PowerShot SX600 HS

(first SX-Series based PowerShot camera to be more compact)

- Canon PowerShot SX610 HS
- Canon PowerShot SX620 HS
- Canon PowerShot SX700 HS
- Canon PowerShot SX710 HS
- Canon PowerShot SX720 HS
- Canon PowerShot SX730 HS

(first Powershot camera with a flip screen for selfies and vlogs)

- Canon PowerShot SX740 HS (features 4K recording)

===== PowerShot T series =====
- Canon PowerShot TX1

== Electronic dictionaries (only sold in Japan) ==
=== Canon Wordtank ===
- Canon Wordtank V80
- Canon Wordtank V70
- Canon Wordtank V30
- Canon Wordtank G50
- Canon Wordtank C30
- Canon IDF-4600
- Canon IDF-2200E
- Canon IDF-3000
- Canon IDF-2100
- Canon IDF-1000
- Canon IDC-300

== Portable flash ==
=== E line ===
- Speedlite 200E

=== EG line ===
- Speedlite 480EG

=== EX line ===
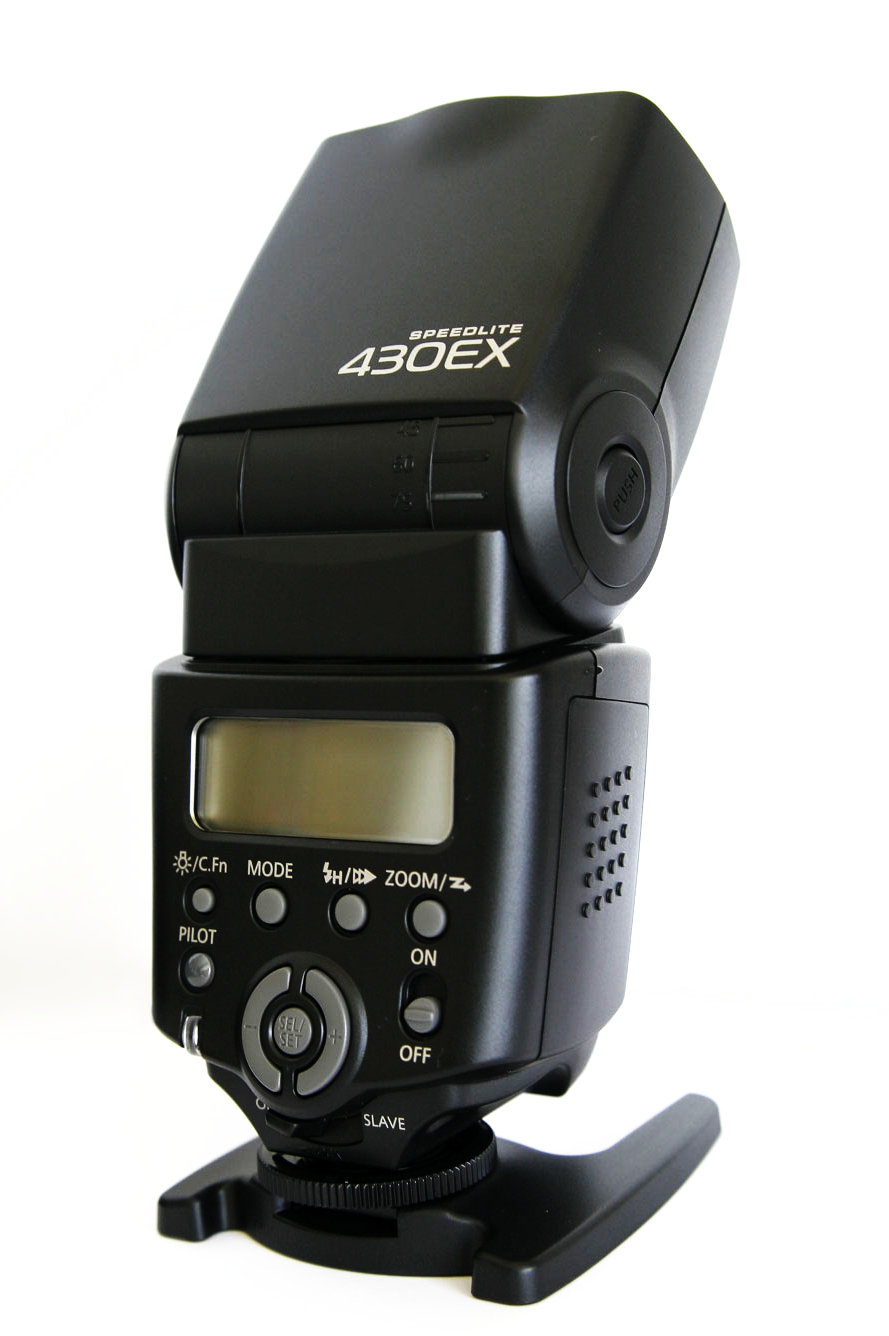
Speedlite 430EX Flash

- Canon Speedlite 90EX
- Canon Speedlite 220EX
- Canon Speedlite 270EX and Canon Speedlite 270EX II
- Canon Speedlite 320EX
- Canon Speedlite 380EX
- Canon Speedlite 420EX
- Canon Speedlite 430EX and Canon Speedlite 430EX II
- Canon Speedlite 550EX
- Canon Speedlite 580EX and Canon Speedlite 580EX II
- Canon Speedlite 600EX and Canon Speedlite 600EX II

=== EZ line ===
Speedlite 300EZ, Speedlite 420EZ, Speedlite 430EZ, Speedlite 540EZ

=== T line ===
- Speedlite 300T

The 300T is a layover from the FD system, it was introduced with the FD mount Canon T90, but is compatible in TTL mode with most non-digital EF cameras.

=== Macro flashguns ===
Macro Twin Lite MT-24EX, Macro Ring Lite MR-14EX, Macro Ring Lite ML-3

=== Remote flash trigger ===
- Speedlite Transmitter ST-E2

== Multifunction peripheral/digital copiers ==
=== imageRUNNER series ===
All-in-One office printers manufactured from 2007 to 2013. The "iR" series uses Ultra Fast Rendering (UFR) printing system, and some models use UFR II, a page description language.

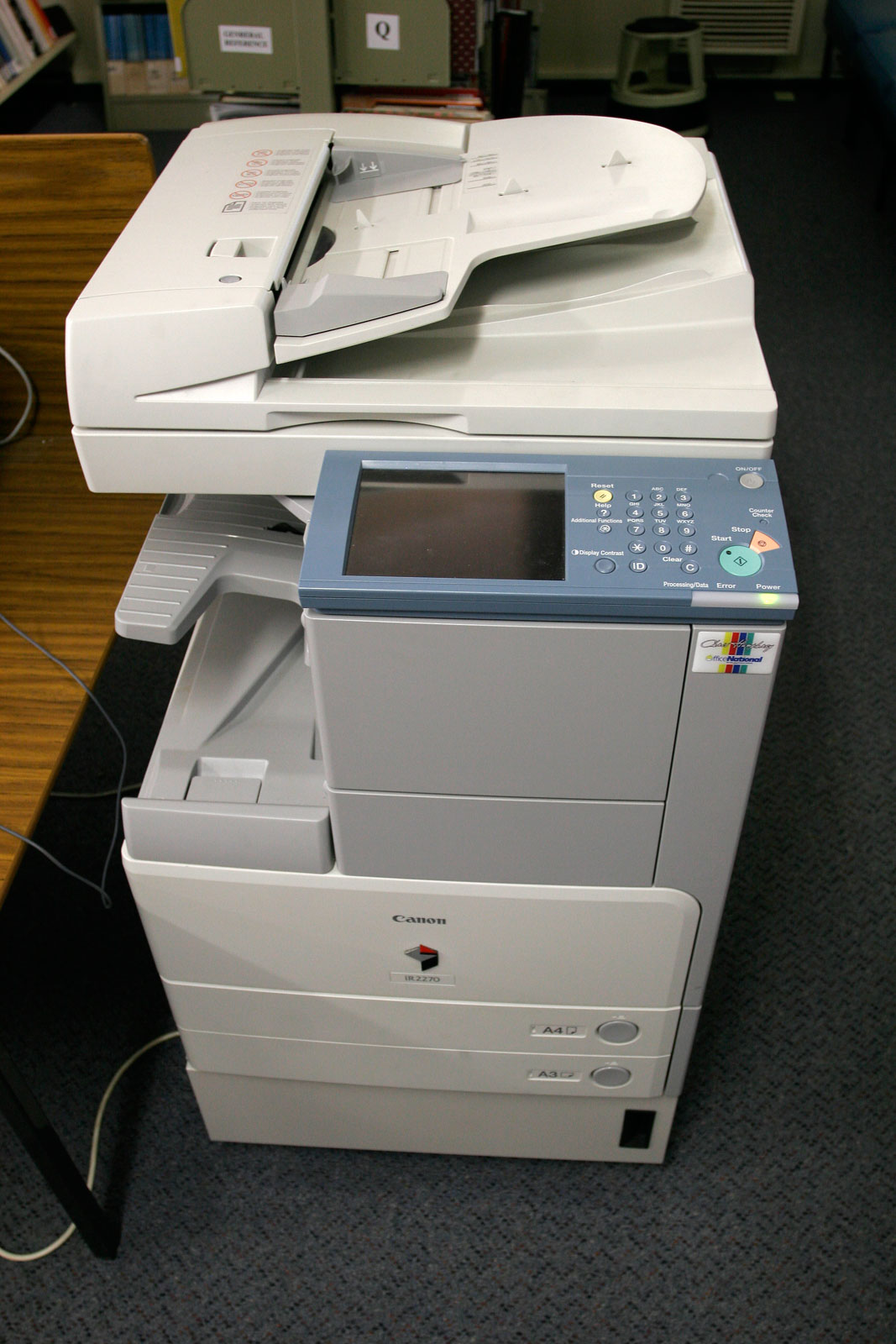
Canon imageRUNNER 2270

- Canon imageRUNNER 2230
- Canon imageRUNNER 2270
- Canon imageRUNNER 2830
- Canon imageRUNNER 3570
- Canon imageRUNNER 5000
- Canon imageRUNNER 5075
- Canon imageRUNNER 5570
- Canon imageRUNNER 6570
- Canon imageRUNNER C5870
- Canon imageRUNNER C6870
- Canon imageRUNNER 7086
- Canon imageRUNNER 7095
- Canon imageRUNNER 7105
- Canon imageRUNNER 8070
- Canon imageRUNNER 110
- Canon imageRUNNER 150vp
- Canon imageRUNNER 2022N
- Canon imageRUNNER Advance c5035
- Canon imageRUNNER Advance c5045
- Canon imageRUNNER Advance c5045i
- Canon imageRUNNER Advance c5025
- Canon imageRUNNER Advance c5030
- Canon imageRUNNER Advance c7055
- Canon imageRUNNER Advance c7065
- Canon imageRUNNER Advance c9065
- Canon imageRUNNER Advance c9075

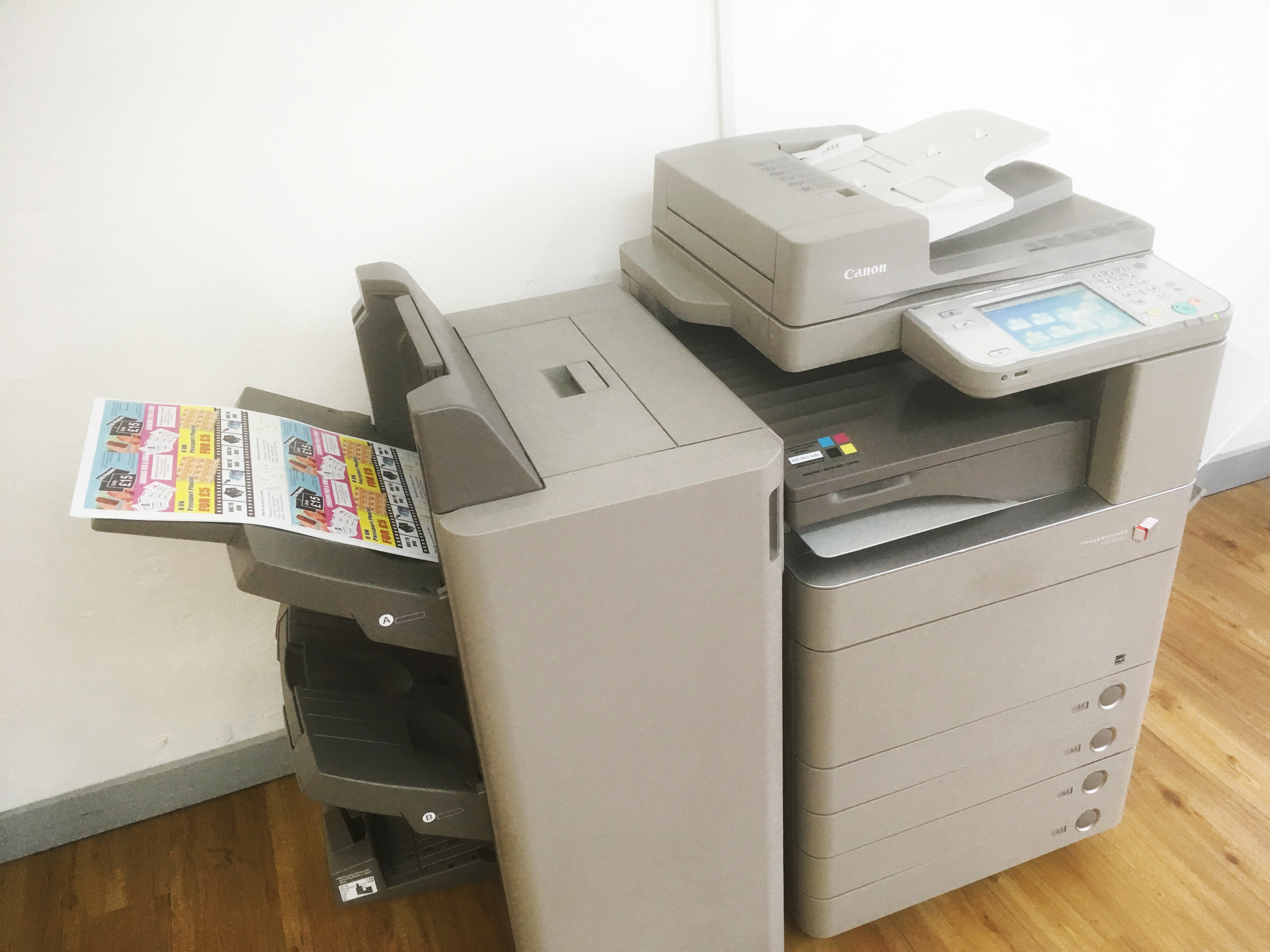
Canon imageRUNNER Advance (unknown model)

Manufactured as of 2022 color printers

- imageRUNNER ADVANCE DX C257/C357 Series
- imageRUNNER ADVANCE DX C3700 Series
- imageRUNNER ADVANCE DX C477 Series
- imageRUNNER ADVANCE DX C478 Series
- imageRUNNER ADVANCE DX C5800 Series
- imageRUNNER ADVANCE DX C7700 series
- imageRUNNER ADVANCE EQ80 C5200 Series
- imageRUNNER C1530 Series
- imageRUNNER C3226i

Manufactured as of 2022 black&white printers

- imageRUNNER 1643 II Series
- imageRUNNER ADVANCE DX 4700 Series
- imageRUNNER ADVANCE DX 6780i
- imageRUNNER ADVANCE DX 6800 Series
- imageRUNNER ADVANCE DX 717/617/527 Series
- imageRUNNER ADVANCE DX 8700 Series
- imageRUNNER ADVANCE EQ80 4200 Series
- imageRUNNER ADVANCE EQ80 6275i
- imageRUNNER 1600 Series
- imageRUNNER 2206
- imageRUNNER 2206iF
- imageRUNNER 2206N
- imageRUNNER 2425 Series
- imageRUNNER 2600 Series

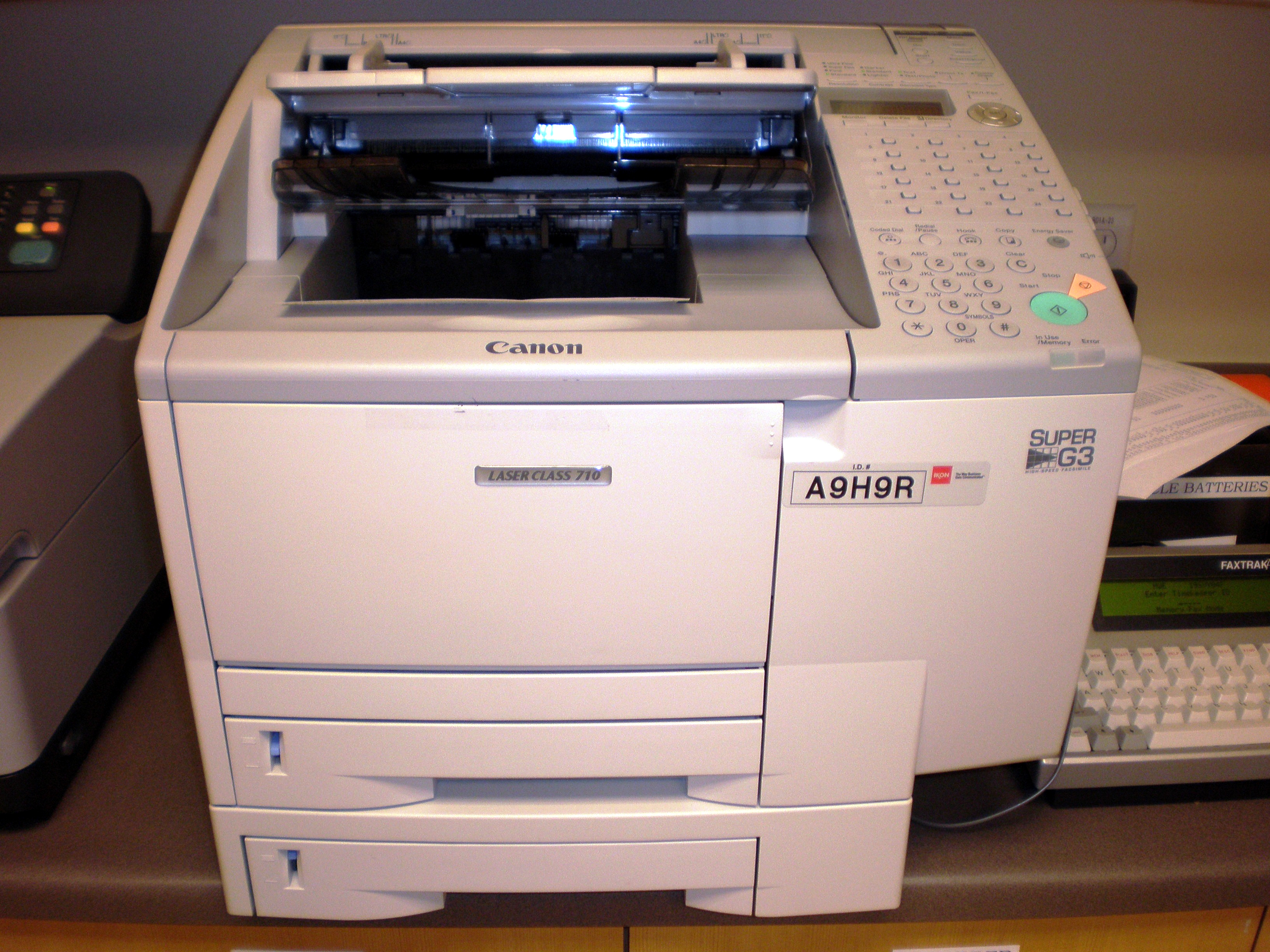
Canon Laser Class 710 fax machine

=== Canon Laser series ===
- Canon Color Laser Copier 1110
- Canon Color Laser Copier 1140
- Canon Color Laser Copier 1180
- Canon Color Laser Copier 3900
- Canon Color Laser Copier 3900+
- Canon Color Laser Copier 4000
- Canon Color Laser Copier 5100
- Canon LASER CLASS 2050P
- Canon LASER CLASS 310
- Canon LASER CLASS 510
- Canon LASER CLASS 650i
- Canon LASER CLASS 710
- Canon LASER CLASS 730i
- Canon LASER CLASS 810
- Canon LASER CLASS 830i
- FMF 2100 Facsimile System
- FMF 3100 Office Multifunctional System
- Canon Imagepress C1
- Canon Imagepress C6000
- Canon Imagepress C7000VP

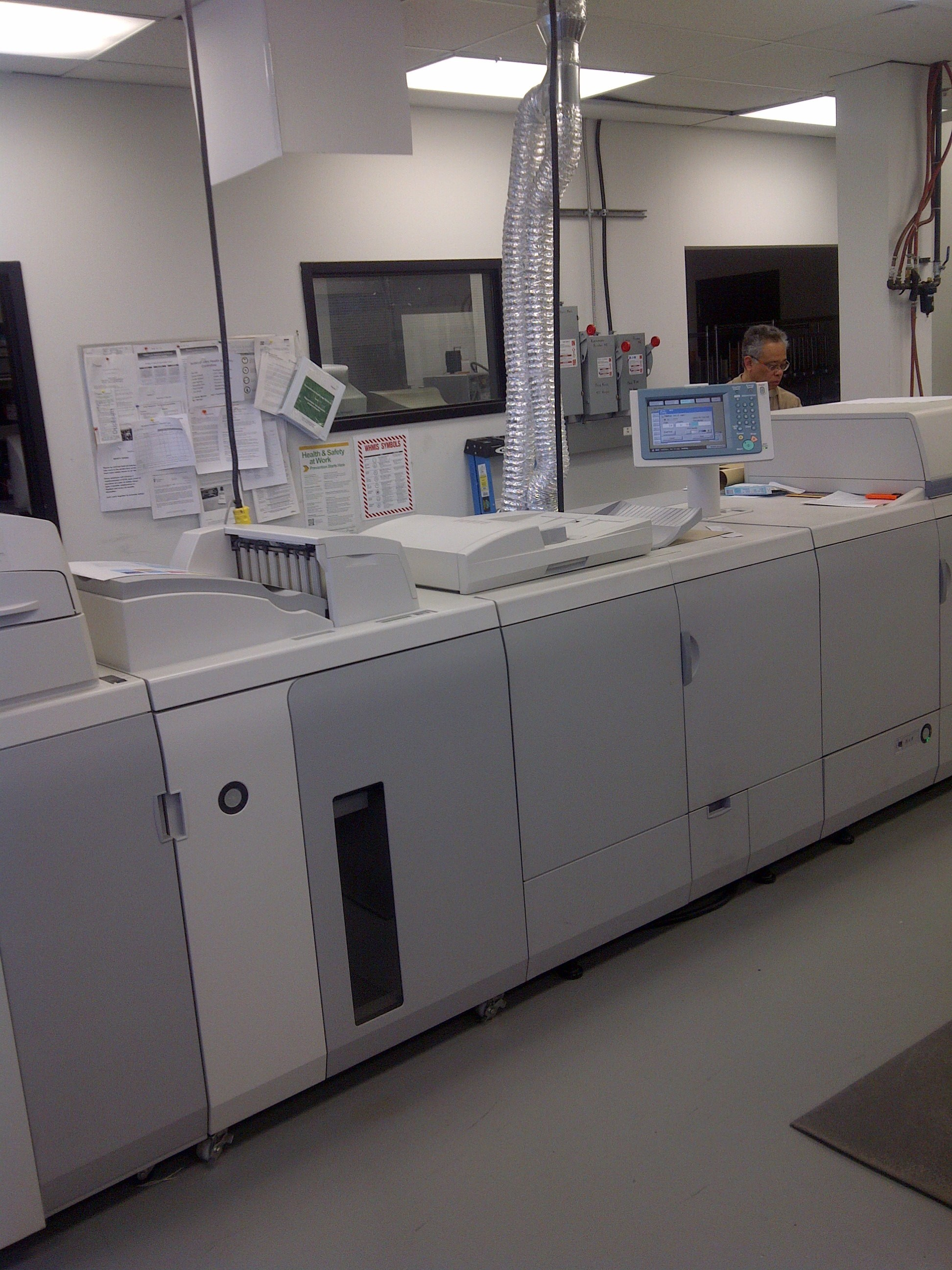
Canon imagePRESS C7000VP

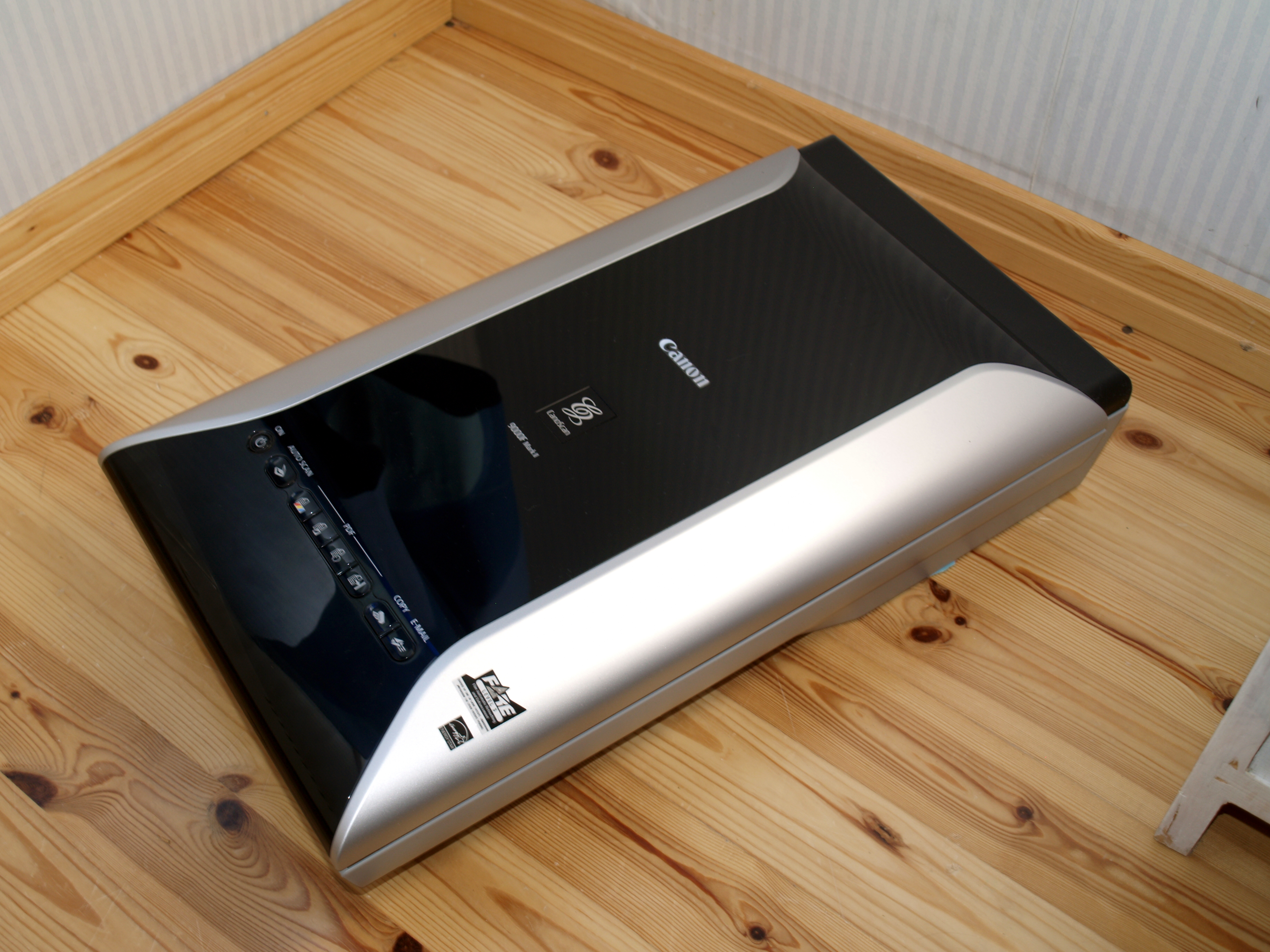
Canon CanoScan 9000F Mark II

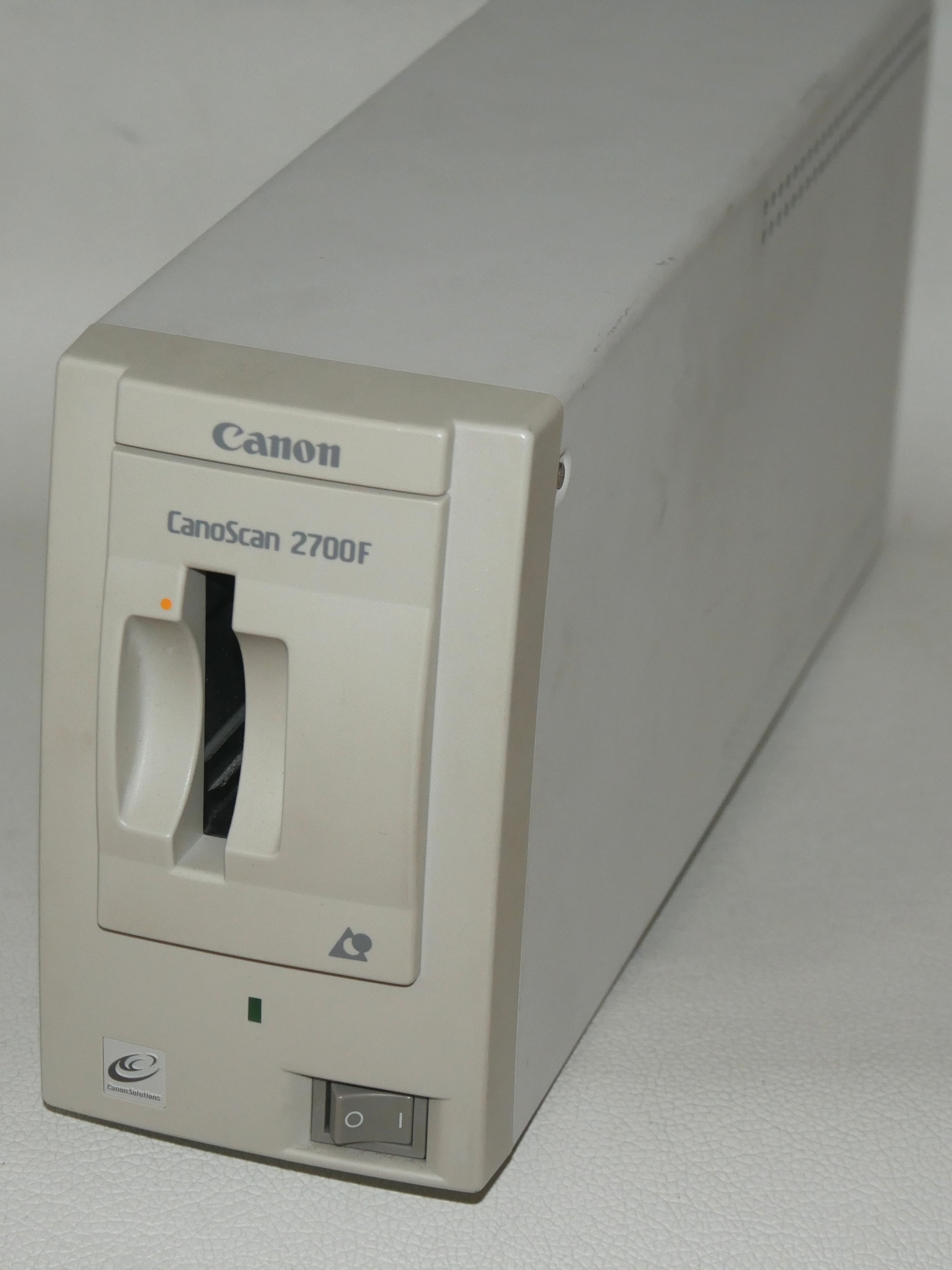
Canon CanoScan 2700F film scanner

=== CanoScan ===
- LiDE (USB powered, LED lit)
- CR
- DR
- imageCLASS MF4890
- IS
- F Series

- 9000F Mark II

== Computers ==
- Canon Cat
- Canon A-200
- Canon AS-100

=== Portable computers ===
==== StarWriter ====
StarWriter Jet 300 — a word processor and Personal Publishing System.

==== NoteJet ====
Beginning in Spring 1993, Canon produced a series of notebooks with integrated inkjet printers called NoteJet. The initial price for the first-model NoteJet was U.S. $2,499. The NoteJet lineup was eventually discontinued, and computers belonging to the series are valued by collectors.

- NoteJet 486
- NoteJet 486 Model 2
- NoteJet I
- NoteJet II
- NoteJet III
- NoteJet IIIcx

== Calculators ==
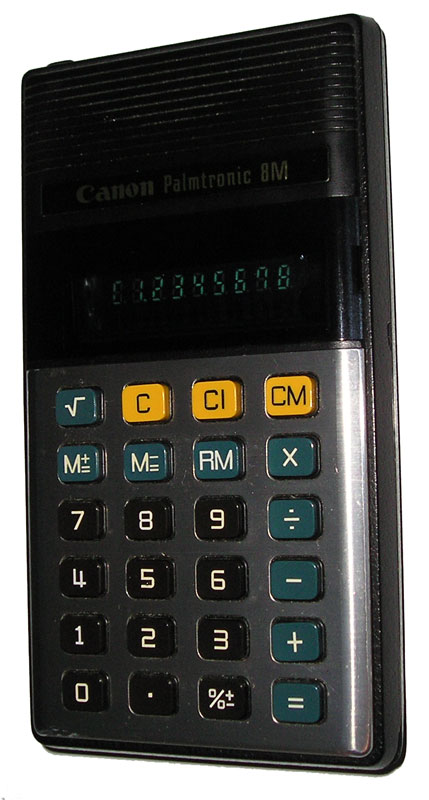
Canon Palmtronic 8M

- Canola 164P Desktop Calculator – Canon's third-generation electronic calculator introduced in 1970s
- Palmtronic
- Palmtronic F-6
- Canon Palmtronic LE-80M
- Canon TS-83H
- X Mark II – Design award-winning calculator
- LS-123K – Metallic Color series
- LS-103TUC – Japan Color series
- P170-DHV
- F-605G
- F-710
- AS-120
- AS-1200
- AS-8
- LS-88HI III
- LS-82Z
- LS-100TS
- Ai Note IN-3000, a PDA with handwritten input capability introduced in 1989

== Printers ==
Canon printers are supplied with Canon Advanced Printing Technology (CAPT), a printer driver software stack developed by Canon. The company claims that its use of data compression reduces their printer's memory requirement, good quality compared to conventional laser printers, and also claim that it increases the data transfer rate when printing high-resolution graphics.

- Canon PJ-1080A colour inkjet (also sold under several other brand names)

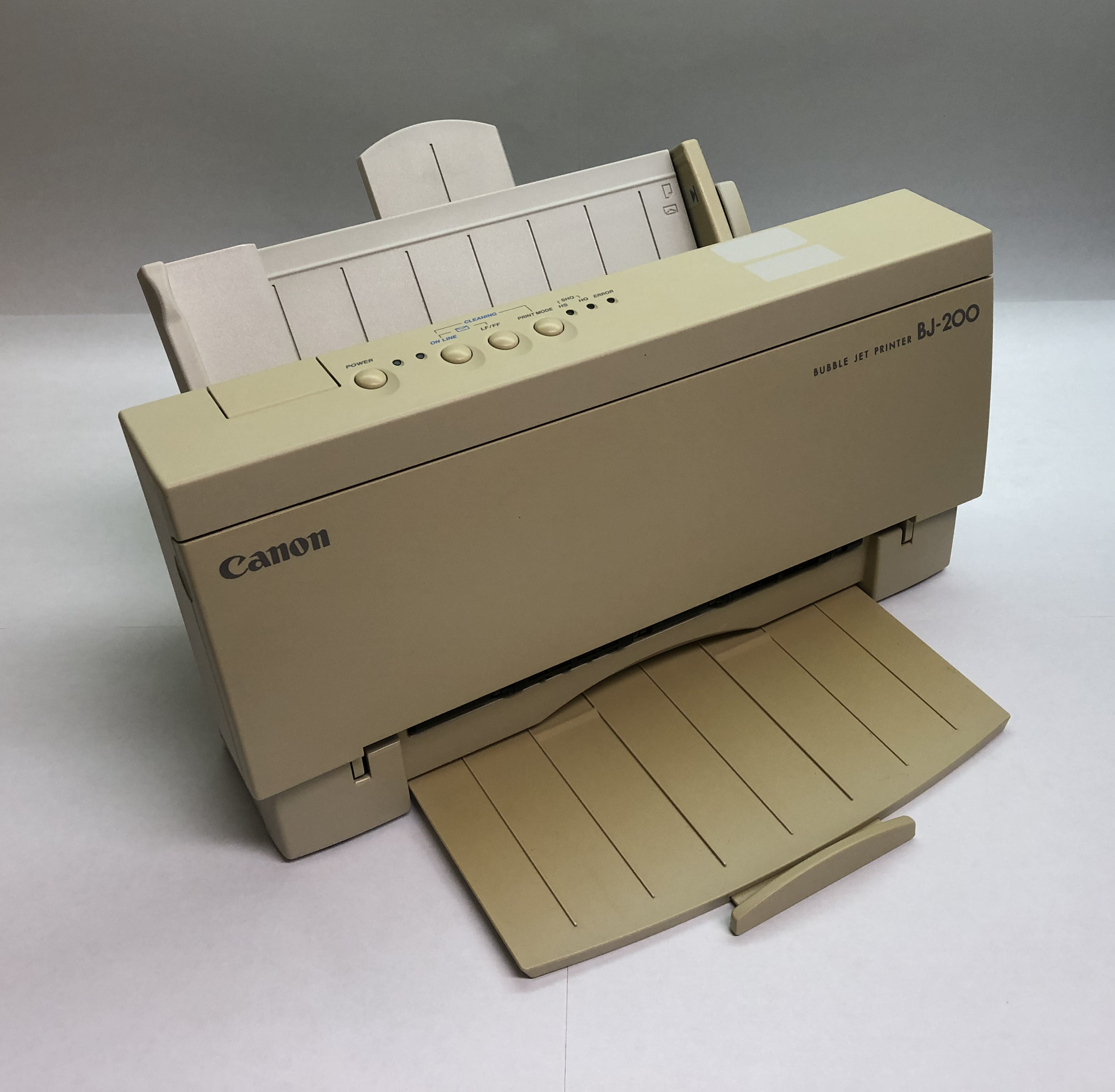
BJ-200 printer was a monochrome bubble jet printer released in 1988

=== BJ series ===
Series introduced in the 1990s. Black & white only.

- Canon BJ-5
- Canon BJ-10E
- Canon BJ-10EX
- Canon BJ-20
- Canon BJ-30
- Canon BJ-30v
- Canon BJ-100
- Canon BJ-130
- Canon BJ-130E
- Canon BJ-200
- Canon BJ-200E
- Canon BJ-200EX
- Canon BJ-220JC
- Canon BJ-220JC II
- Canon BJ-220JS
- Canon BJ-220JS II
- Canon BJ-230
- Canon BJ-300
- Canon BJ-330
- Canon BJ535PD
- Canon BJ895PD

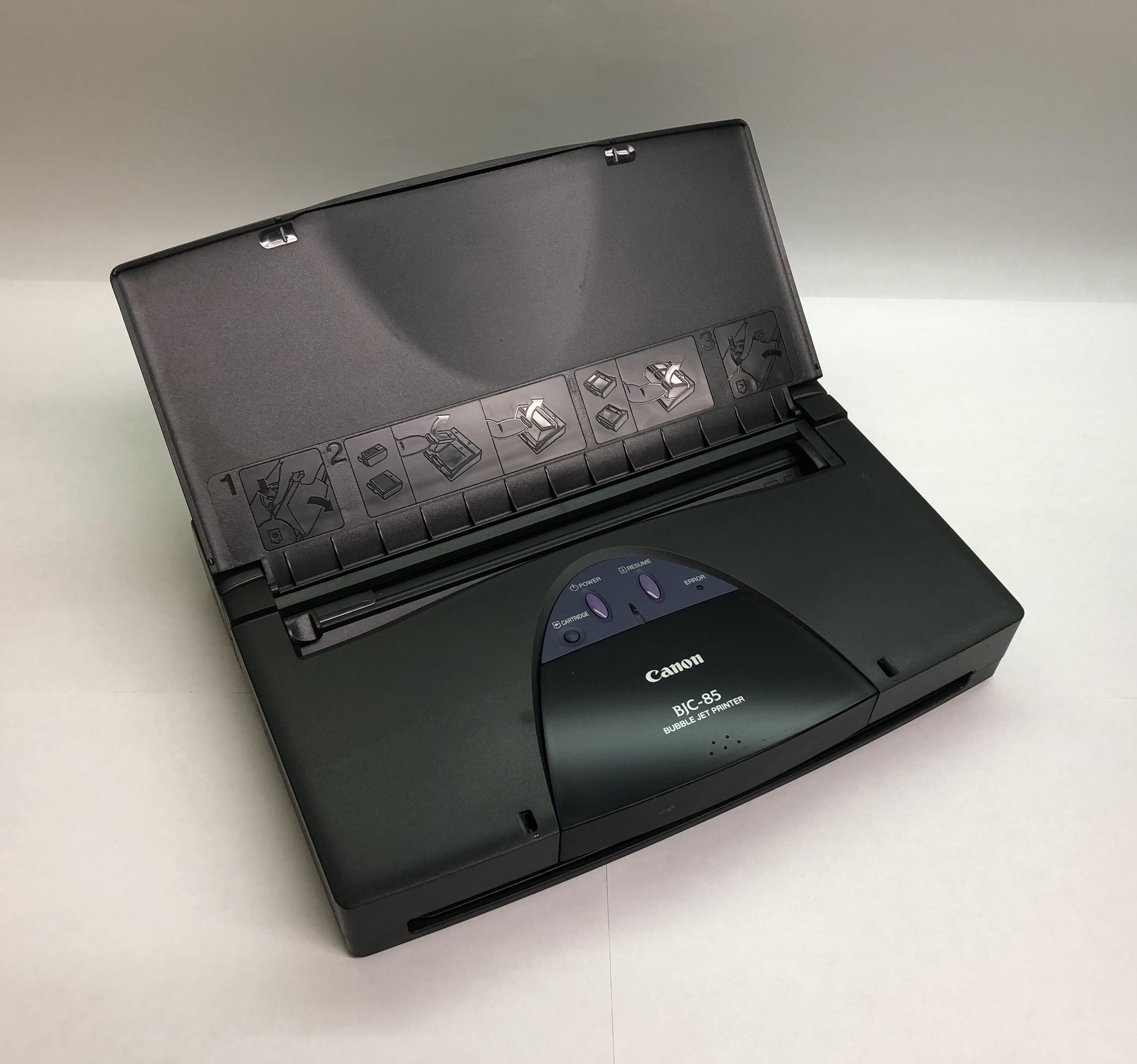
BJC-85 printer was a color bubble jet printer released in 2000

=== BJC series ===
Series introduced in the 1990s. Canon refers to inkjet printers as bubblejets, hence the frequent BJC-prefix (BubbleJet Color).

- Canon BJC-50
- Canon BJC-55
- Canon BJC-70
- Canon BJC-80
- Canon BJC-85
- Canon BJC-85W
- Canon BJC-210
- Canon BJC-210SP
- Canon BJC-240
- Canon BJC-250
- Canon BJC-255SP
- Canon BJC-600
- Canon BJC-600e
- Canon BJC-610
- Canon BJC-620
- Canon BJC-800
- Canon BJC-1000
- Canon BJC-2000
- Canon BJC-2010
- Canon BJC-2100
- Canon BJC-2100SP
- Canon BJC-2110
- Canon BJC-3000
- Canon BJC-4000
- Canon BJC-4100
- Canon BJC-4200
- Canon BJC-4300
- Canon BJC-4400
- Canon BJC-4550
- Canon BJC-5000
- Canon BJC-5100
- Canon BJC-5500
- Canon BJC-6000
- Canon BJC-6100
- Canon BJC-6200
- Canon BJC-6200S
- Canon BJC-6500
- Canon BJC-7000
- Canon BJC-7100
- Canon BJC-8000
- Canon BJC-8200
- Canon BJC-8500

=== i series ===
In Japan, the models are denoted with a trailing "i", whereas in the rest of the world they are denoted with a leading "i". While the 50i corresponds to the i70, for all other corresponding models the numerical model numbers are identical. The "X" denotes models sold under special dispensation by retail outlets in Europe.

- Canon i70
- Canon i80
- Canon i250
- Canon i450
- Canon i450X
- Canon i455
- Canon i455X
- Canon i470D
- Canon i475D
- Canon i550
- Canon i550X
- Canon i560
- Canon i560X
- Canon i850
- Canon i860
- Canon i865
- Canon i900D
- Canon i905D
- Canon i950
- Canon i960
- Canon i965
- Canon i990
- Canon i6100
- Canon i6500
- Canon i9100
- Canon i9900
- Canon i9950
- Canon 50i
- Canon 80i
- Canon 450i
- Canon 455i
- Canon 470PD
- Canon 475PD
- Canon 550i
- Canon 560i
- Canon 850i
- Canon 860i
- Canon 865R
- Canon 900PD
- Canon 950i
- Canon 960i
- Canon 990i
- Canon 6100i
- Canon 6500i
- Canon 9100i
- Canon 9900i

=== SmartBase series ===
- MPC190 aka F10
- MPC200 aka F20
- MPC360, MPC370, MPC390
- MPC400 aka F30 (based on S600)
- MPC600F aka F50 aka T-Fax 7960
- F60
- F80

=== MultiPASS Series ===
- 10
- C20
- C30
- C50
- C70
- C75
- C80
- C100
- C530
- C545
- C550
- C555
- C560
- C635
- C755
- C2500
- C3000
- C3500
- C5000

=== PIXMA series ===
Canon PIXMA iP3000 printer.

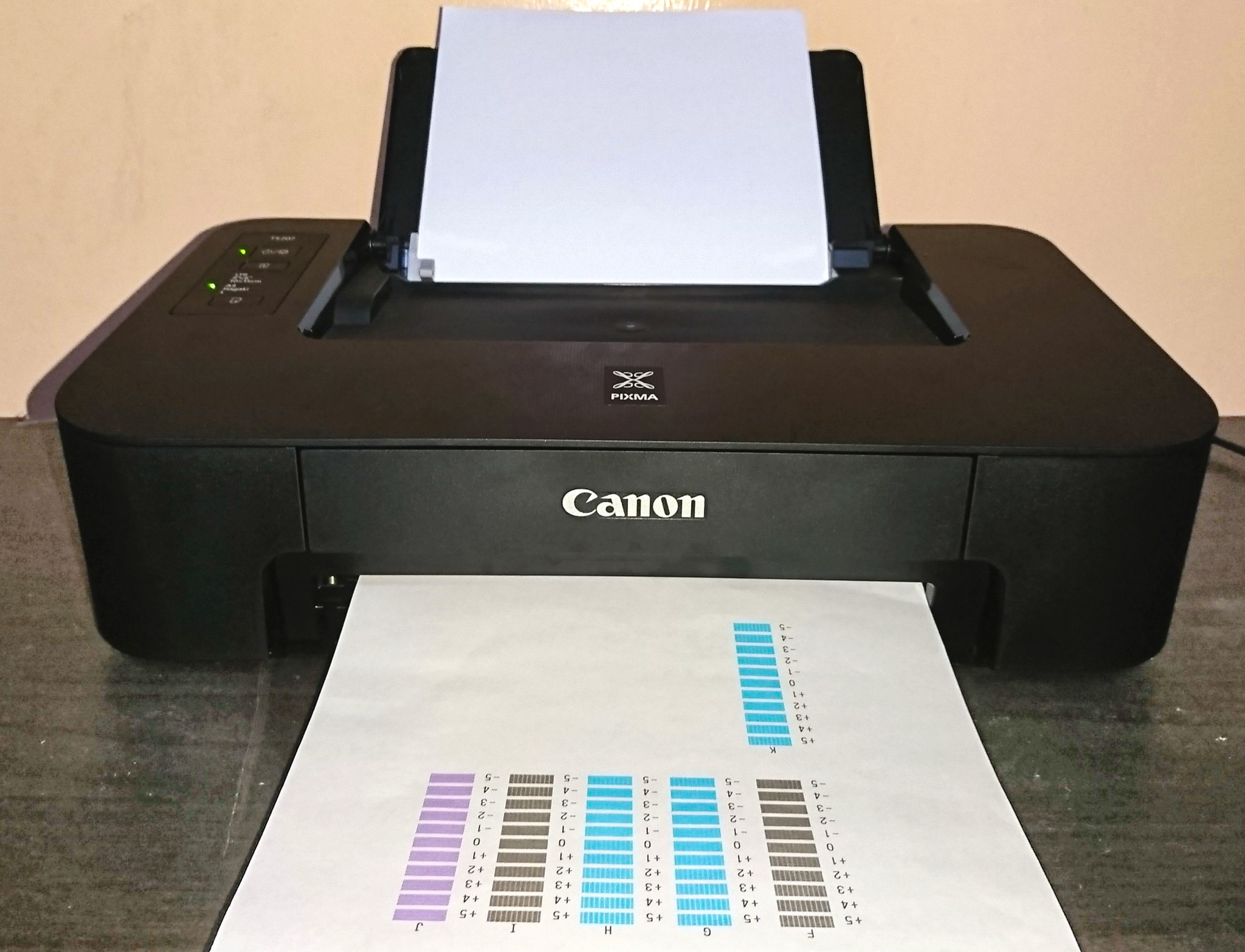
Canon PIXMA TS207 Printer.

Since about 2005 Canon introduced a numbering scheme for some whereby the least significant (non-zero) digit signifies the geographic region ("3" signifying Japan) the device is sold in. This leads to a large number of models, all belonging to the same family, but possibly incompatible to some degree, and also makes it difficult to ascertain whether a device is unique or part of an existing family. The software driver filename will often use the family designation.

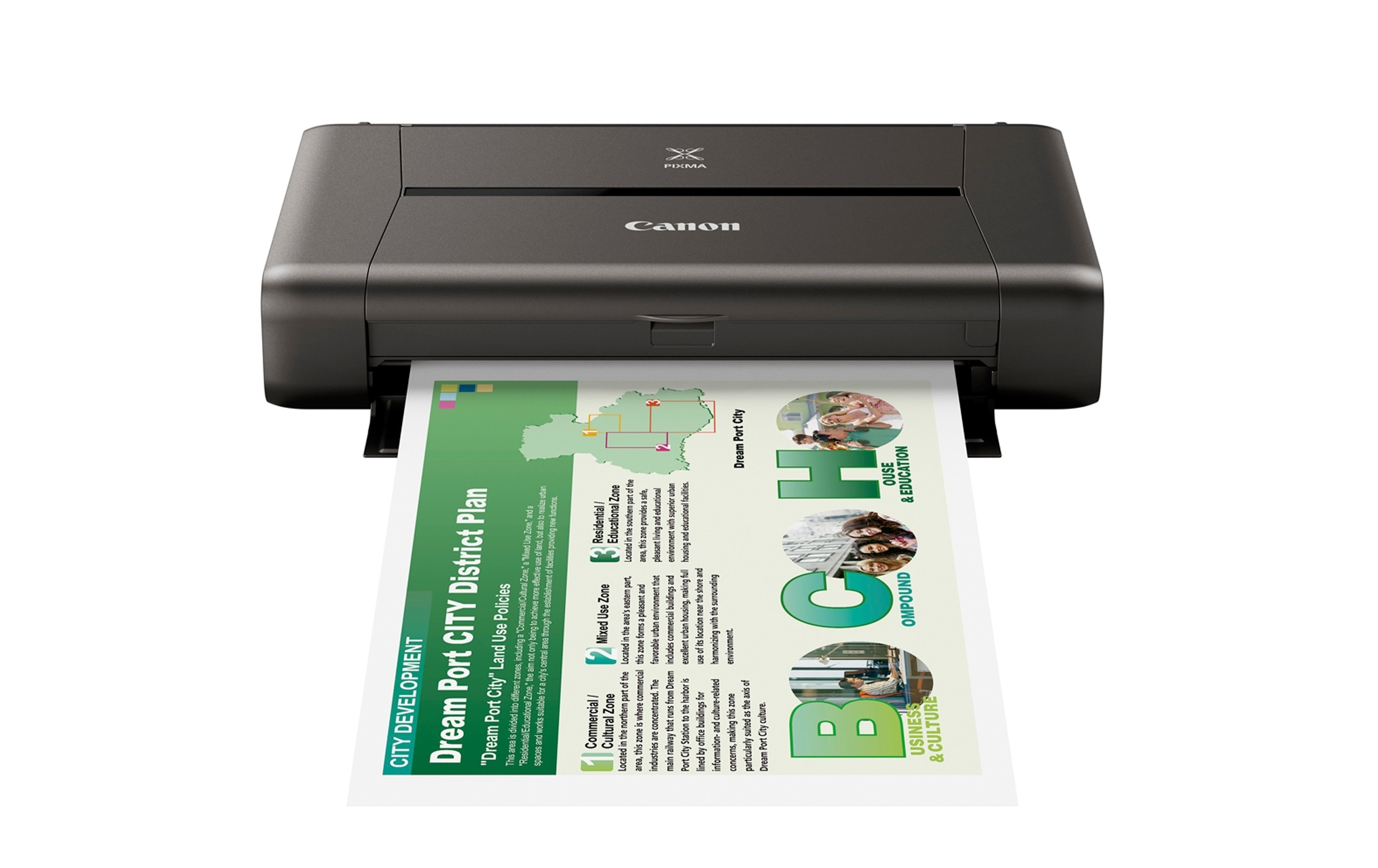
Canon PIXMA iP110

Some MP devices have fax capability (MP740). R=remote

- Canon PIXMA G1000
- Canon PIXMA G1010
- Canon PIXMA G1020
- Canon PIXMA G2000
- Canon PIXMA G2010
- Canon PIXMA G2012
- Canon PIXMA G2020
- Canon PIXMA G2021
- Canon PIXMA G2060
- Canon PIXMA G2070
- Canon PIXMA G3000
- Canon PIXMA G3010
- Canon PIXMA G3012
- Canon PIXMA G3020
- Canon PIXMA G3021
- Canon PIXMA G3060
- Canon PIXMA G4000
- Canon PIXMA G4010
- Canon PIXMA G6070
- Canon PIXMA iP1000
- Canon PIXMA iP1200
- Canon PIXMA iP1300
- Canon PIXMA iP1500
- Canon PIXMA iP1600
- Canon PIXMA iP1700
- Canon PIXMA iP1800
- Canon PIXMA iP1980
- Canon PIXMA iP2000
- Canon PIXMA iP2200
- Canon PIXMA iP2500
- Canon PIXMA iP2600
- Canon PIXMA iP2700
- Canon PIXMA iP3000
- Canon PIXMA iP3100
- Canon PIXMA iP3300
- Canon PIXMA iP3500
- Canon PIXMA iP3600
- Canon PIXMA iP4000
- Canon PIXMA iP4000R
- Canon PIXMA iP4200
- Canon PIXMA iP4300
- Canon PIXMA iP4500
- Canon PIXMA iP4600
- Canon PIXMA iP4700
- Canon PIXMA iP4800 (iP4830)
- Canon PIXMA iP4850
- Canon PIXMA iP4900 (iP4930)
- Canon PIXMA iP5000
- Canon PIXMA iP5200
- Canon PIXMA iP5200R
- Canon PIXMA iP5300
- Canon PIXMA iP6000D
- Canon PIXMA iP6100D
- Canon PIXMA iP6210D
- Canon PIXMA iP6220D
- Canon PIXMA iP6310D
- Canon PIXMA iP6320D
- Canon PIXMA iP6600D
- Canon PIXMA iP6700D
- Canon PIXMA iP7100
- Canon PIXMA iP7200 (iP7230)
- Canon PIXMA iP7500
- Canon PIXMA iP8100
- Canon PIXMA iP8500
- Canon PIXMA iP8600
- Canon PIXMA iP8760
- Canon PIXMA iP9910
- Canon PIXMA iP90
- Canon PIXMA iP90v
- Canon PIXMA iP100
- Canon PIXMA mini220
- Canon PIXMA mini320
- Canon PIXMA mini360
- Canon PIXMA iX4000
- Canon PIXMA iX5000
- Canon PIXMA iX6500 (iX6530)
- Canon PIXMA iX7000
- Canon PIXMA MP110
- Canon PIXMA MP130
- Canon PIXMA MP140
- Canon PIXMA MP150
- Canon PIXMA MP160
- Canon PIXMA MP170
- Canon PIXMA MP180
- Canon PIXMA MP190
- Canon PIXMA MP210
- Canon PIXMA MP220
- Canon PIXMA MP230
- Canon PIXMA MP240
- Canon PIXMA MP250
- Canon PIXMA MP258
- Canon PIXMA MP260
- Canon PIXMA MP270
- Canon PIXMA MP280
- Canon PIXMA MP287
- Canon PIXMA MP360
- Canon PIXMA MP370
- Canon PIXMA MP375R
- Canon PIXMA MP390
- Canon PIXMA MP450
- Canon PIXMA MP460
- Canon PIXMA MP470
- Canon PIXMA MP480
- Canon PIXMA MP490
- Canon PIXMA MP493
- Canon PIXMA MP495
- Canon PIXMA MP500
- Canon PIXMA MP510
- Canon PIXMA MP520
- Canon PIXMA MP530
- Canon PIXMA MP540
- Canon PIXMA MP550
- Canon PIXMA MP560
- Canon PIXMA MP600
- Canon PIXMA MP600R
- Canon PIXMA MP610
- Canon PIXMA MP620
- Canon PIXMA MP630
- Canon PIXMA MP640
- Canon PIXMA MP700
- Canon PIXMA MP710
- Canon PIXMA MP730
- Canon PIXMA MP740
- Canon PIXMA MP750
- Canon PIXMA MP760
- Canon PIXMA MP780
- Canon PIXMA MP790
- Canon PIXMA MP800
- Canon PIXMA MP800R
- Canon PIXMA MP810
- Canon PIXMA MP830
- Canon PIXMA MP950
- Canon PIXMA MP960
- Canon PIXMA MP970
- Canon PIXMA MP980
- Canon PIXMA MP990
- Canon PIXMA MG2100
- Canon PIXMA MG2200
- Canon PIXMA MG2440
- Canon PIXMA MG2470
- Canon PIXMA MG3100
- Canon PIXMA MG3200
- Canon PIXMA MG4100
- Canon PIXMA MG4200
- Canon PIXMA MG5100
- Canon PIXMA MG5200
- Canon PIXMA MG5300
- Canon PIXMA MG5400
- Canon PIXMA MG5500
- Canon PIXMA MG5740
- Canon PIXMA MG6100
- Canon PIXMA MG6200
- Canon PIXMA MG6300
- Canon PIXMA MG7560
- Canon PIXMA MG8100
- Canon PIXMA MG8200
- Canon PIXMA MX300
- Canon PIXMA MX310
- Canon PIXMA MX320
- Canon PIXMA MX330
- Canon PIXMA MX340
- Canon PIXMA MX350
- Canon PIXMA MX360
- Canon PIXMA MX370
- Canon PIXMA MX410
- Canon PIXMA MX420
- Canon PIXMA MX430
- Canon PIXMA MX510
- Canon PIXMA MX700
- Canon PIXMA MX710
- Canon PIXMA MX7600
- Canon PIXMA MX850
- Canon PIXMA MX860
- Canon PIXMA MX870
- Canon PIXMA MX880
- Canon PIXMA MX882
- Canon PIXMA MX890
- Canon PIXMA MX892
- Canon PIXMA MX922
- Canon PIXMA MX924
- Canon PIXMA MX925
- Canon PIXMA E480
- Canon PIXMA E500
- Canon PIXMA E600
- Canon PIXMA Pro9000
- Canon PIXMA Pro9000 Mark II
- Canon PIXMA Pro9500
- Canon PIXMA Pro9500 Mark II
- Canon PIXMA PRO-1
- Canon PIXMA PRO-10
- Canon PIXMA PRO-100

=== SELPHY series ===
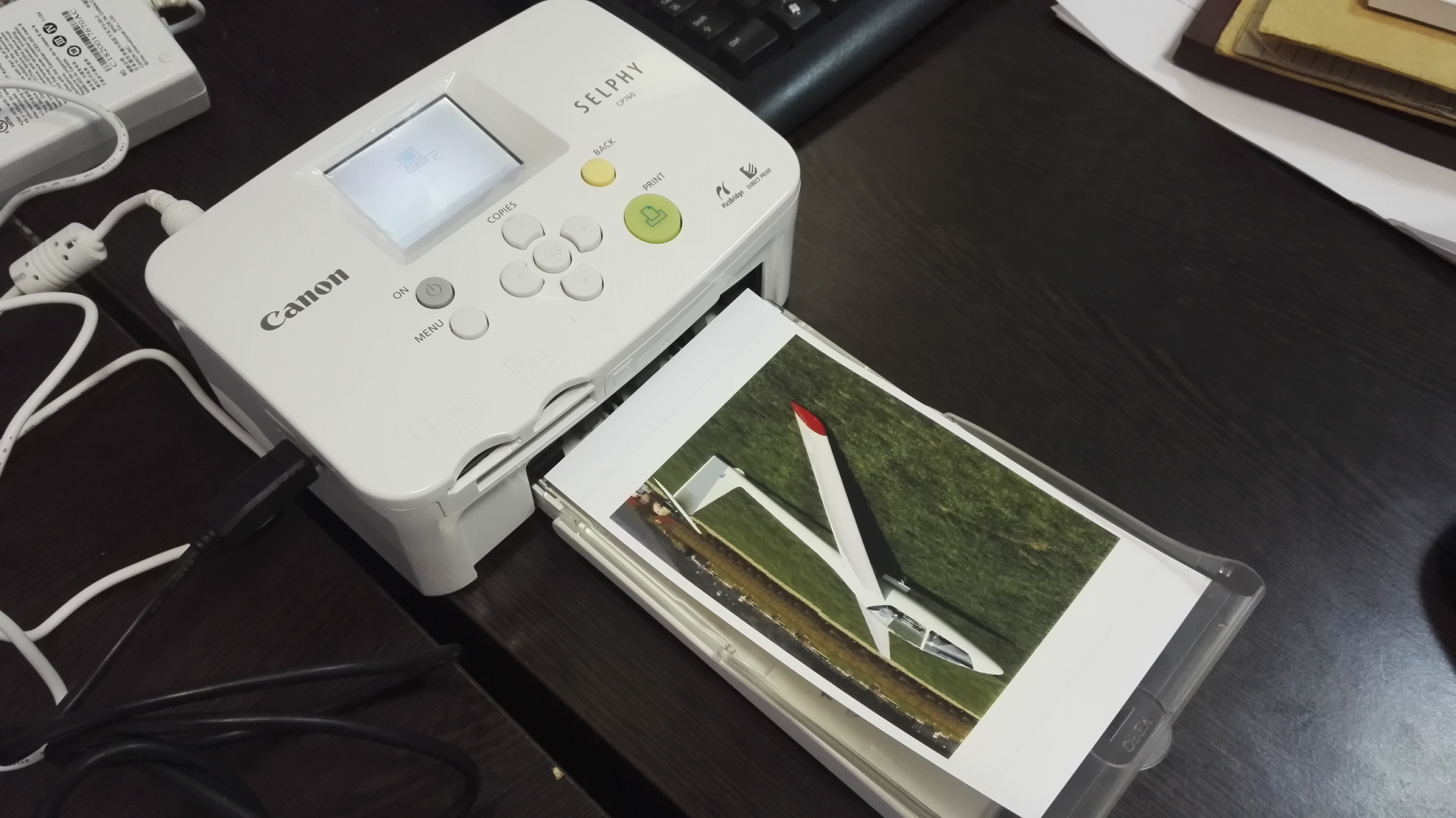
Canon SELPHY CP760 printer

The DS700 and DS810 are inkjet printers; all the other models are thermal dye-sublimation printers.

- Canon SELPHY DS700
- Canon SELPHY DS810
- Canon SELPHY ES1
- Canon SELPHY ES2
- Canon SELPHY ES3
- Canon SELPHY ES20
- Canon SELPHY ES30
- Canon SELPHY ES40
- Canon SELPHY CP-10
- Canon SELPHY CP-100
- Canon SELPHY CP-200
- Canon SELPHY CP-220
- Canon SELPHY CP-300
- Canon SELPHY CP-330
- Canon SELPHY CP400
- Canon SELPHY CP500
- Canon SELPHY CP510
- Canon SELPHY CP520
- Canon SELPHY CP530
- Canon SELPHY CP600
- Canon SELPHY CP710
- Canon SELPHY CP720
- Canon SELPHY CP730
- Canon SELPHY CP740
- Canon SELPHY CP750
- Canon SELPHY CP760
- Canon SELPHY CP770
- Canon SELPHY CP780
- Canon SELPHY CP790
- Canon SELPHY CP800
- Canon SELPHY CP810
- Canon SELPHY CP820
- Canon SELPHY CP900
- Canon SELPHY CP910
- Canon SELPHY CP1000
- Canon SELPHY CP1200
- Canon SELPHY CP1300
- Canon SELPHY CP1500

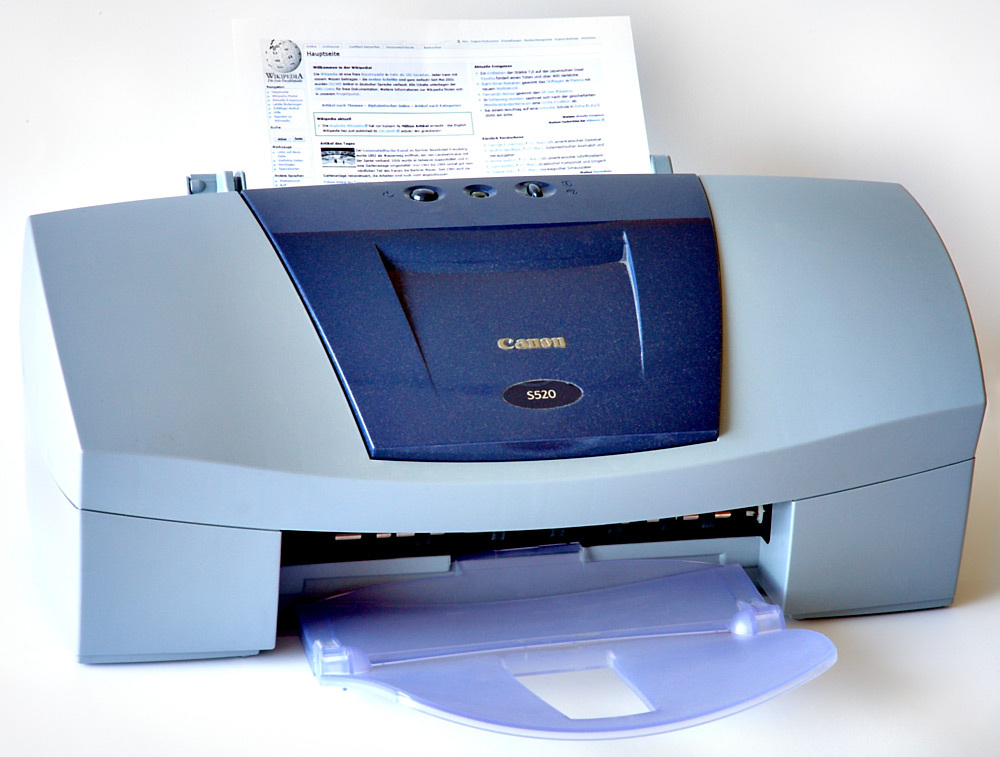
Canon S520 ink jet printer

=== S series ===
- Canon S100
- Canon S200
- Canon S300
- Canon S330
- Canon S400
- Canon S450
- Canon S4500
- Canon S500
- Canon S520
- Canon S530D
- Canon S600
- Canon S630
- Canon S750
- Canon S800
- Canon S820
- Canon S820D
- Canon S830D
- Canon S900
- Canon S9000

=== Laser Printers ===
==== imageCLASS ====
- Canon LBP6030w
- Canon LBP6230dw
- Canon LBP7110Cw

==== imageCLASS X ====
- Canon LBP1800
- Canon LBP1861
- Canon LBP1871
- Canon LBP1127C
- Canon LBP1538C
- Canon MF1333C
- Canon MF1538C

== Lenses ==
=== EF and EF-S line ===
See Canon EF lenses for the product line-up. See Canon EF-S lenses for the product line-up.

EF-S lenses are built for APS-C 1.6x crop sensors, so they only work with models that use this sensor size. When EF-S lenses are used on a 35mm (full frame) camera the back element will hit the mirror assembly or cause substantial vignetting since the sensor is bigger than the image produced by the lens.

=== FD line ===
See Canon FD lenses for the product line-up.

=== FL line ===
See Canon FL lenses for the product line-up.

=== Rangefinder line ===
- Canon 50mm f/0.95

=== Tilt-shift ===
- Canon TS-E 17mm f/4L lens
- Canon TS-E 24mm f/3.5L lens and Canon TS-E 24mm f/3.5L II
- Canon TS-E 45mm f/2.8 lens
- Canon TS-E 90mm f/2.8 lens

=== Dedicated macro ===
- Canon MP-E 65mm f/2.8 1–5x Macro

Note: Even though the tilt-shift and dedicated macro lenses are designated TS-E and MP-E respectively, these lenses are still compatible with the EF mount.

=== Broadcast Studio/Field Lenses ===
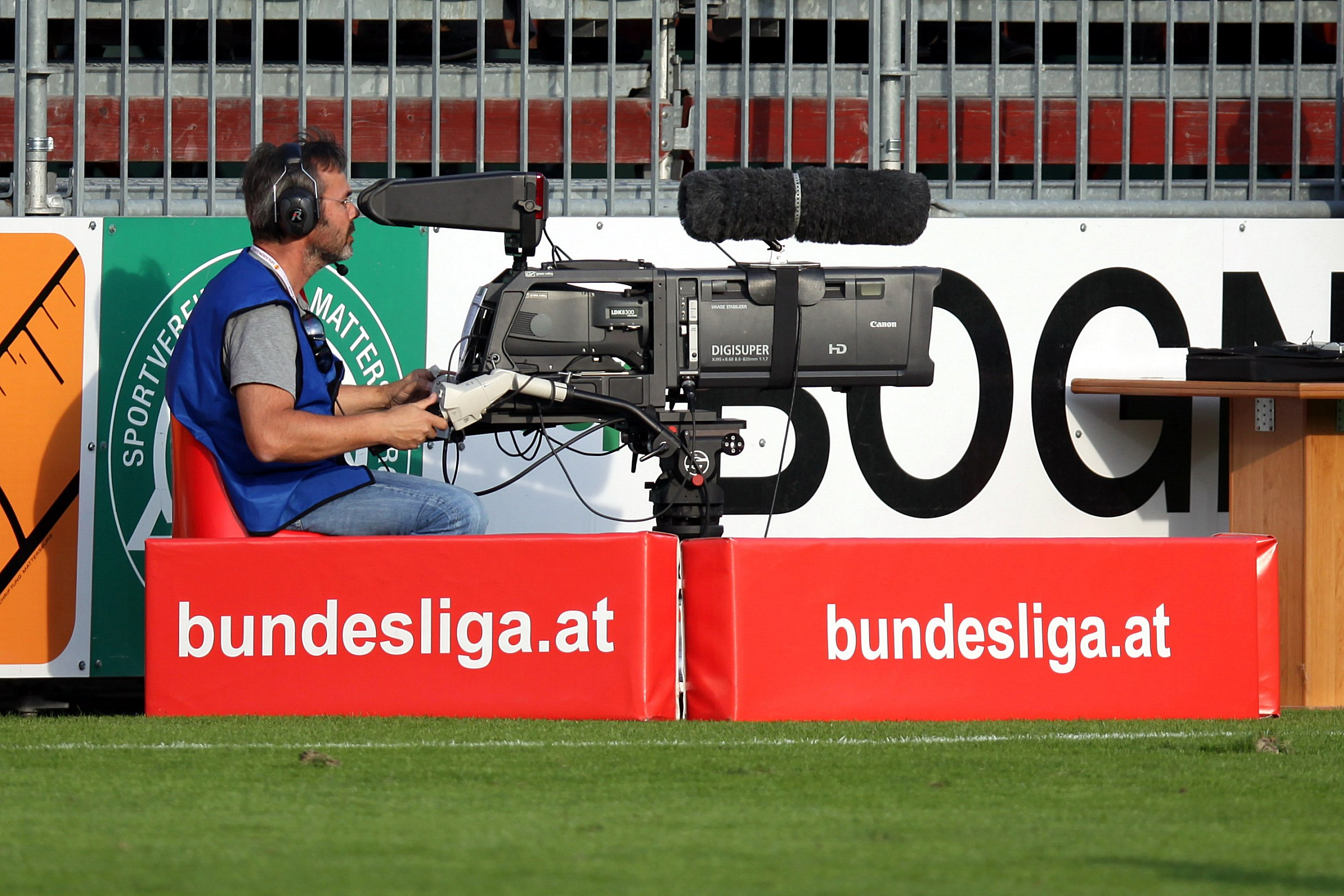
Canon DIGISUPER lens

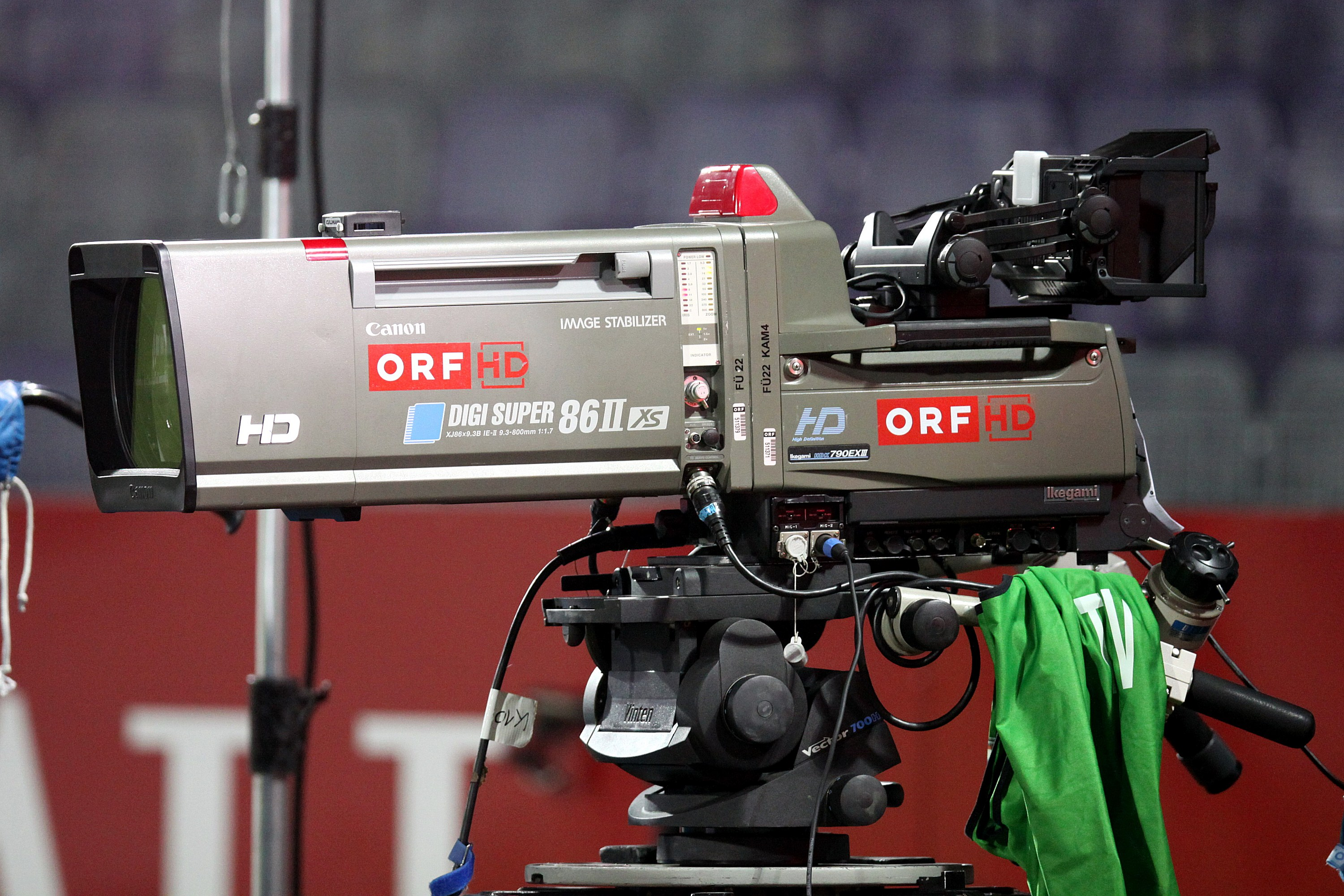
Canon DIGISUPER 86II XS lens with Ikegami HDK-790EXIII camera

- Canon UHD-DIGISUPER 27
- Canon DIGISUPER 60
- Canon UHD-DIGISUPER 66
- Canon DIGISUPER 76
- Canon DIGISUPER 80
- Canon UHD-DIGISUPER 86
- Canon DIGISUPER 86AF
- Canon UHD DIGISUPER 90
- Canon DIGISUPER 95
- Canon DIGISUPER 95 TELE
- Canon DIGISUPER 100
- Canon DIGISUPER 100AF
- Canon UHD-DIGISUPER 111
- Canon UHD-DIGISUPER 122
- Canon UHD-DIGISUPER 122AF

==== HDTV Studio Box Lenses ====
- Canon DIGISUPER 22 xs
- Canon DIGISUPER 27AF

== Presenters ==
- PR10-GC (PR10-G) – Green Laser Presenter with back light LCD & timer display
- PR100-RC (PR100-R) – Red Laser Presenter with back light LCD & timer display
- PR500-RC (PR500-R) – Red Laser Presenter
- PR1000-R – Pen-type Red Laser Presenter

== Software ==
Applications bundled with Canon Digital Cameras and printers include:

- PhotoStitch – image stitching software, used to join multiple photographs together to produce a composite pictures such as panoramas.
- Zoombrowser EX – Image organizer utility for viewing and transferring photos from digital camera to desktop computer.
- Digital Photo Professional is available for asset management and editing of downloaded images.
- CameraWindow DC – Image Downloader utility for transferring photos from digital camera to desktop computer (used by Zoombrowser EX).

=== Canon TrueType Font Pack ===
Released in 1992, Canon TrueType Font Pack is a 3½-inch 1,44 MB floppy disk collection of supplementary TrueType fonts bundled in selling box of some Canon printers of years '90 and useful for Windows 3.1 and 95.

The fonts contained in the collection were:

Font name	File name
American Text BT	TT0211M_.ttf
Americana Bold BT	TT0500M_.ttf
Broadway BT	TT0131M_.ttf
Charter Black BT	TT0709M_.ttf
Charter Black Italic BT	TT0710M_.ttf
Charter BT	TT0648M_.ttf
Charter Italic BT	TT0649M_.ttf
Cloister Black BT	TT0757M_.ttf
Cooper Black BT	TT0630M_.ttf
Dom Casual BT	TT0604M_.ttf
English 157 BT	TT0840M_.ttf
Fraktur BT	TT0983M_.ttf
Impress BT	TT0209M_.ttf
Informal 011 BT	TT1115M_.ttf
PosterBodoni BT	TT0129M_.ttf
Raleigh Demi Bold BT	TT1080M_.ttf
Schadow Black Condensed BT	TT1114M_.ttf
Seagull Heavy BT	TT0820M_.ttf
Staccato 555 BT	TT1153M_.ttf
Umbra BT	TT1074M_.ttf

== Accessories ==
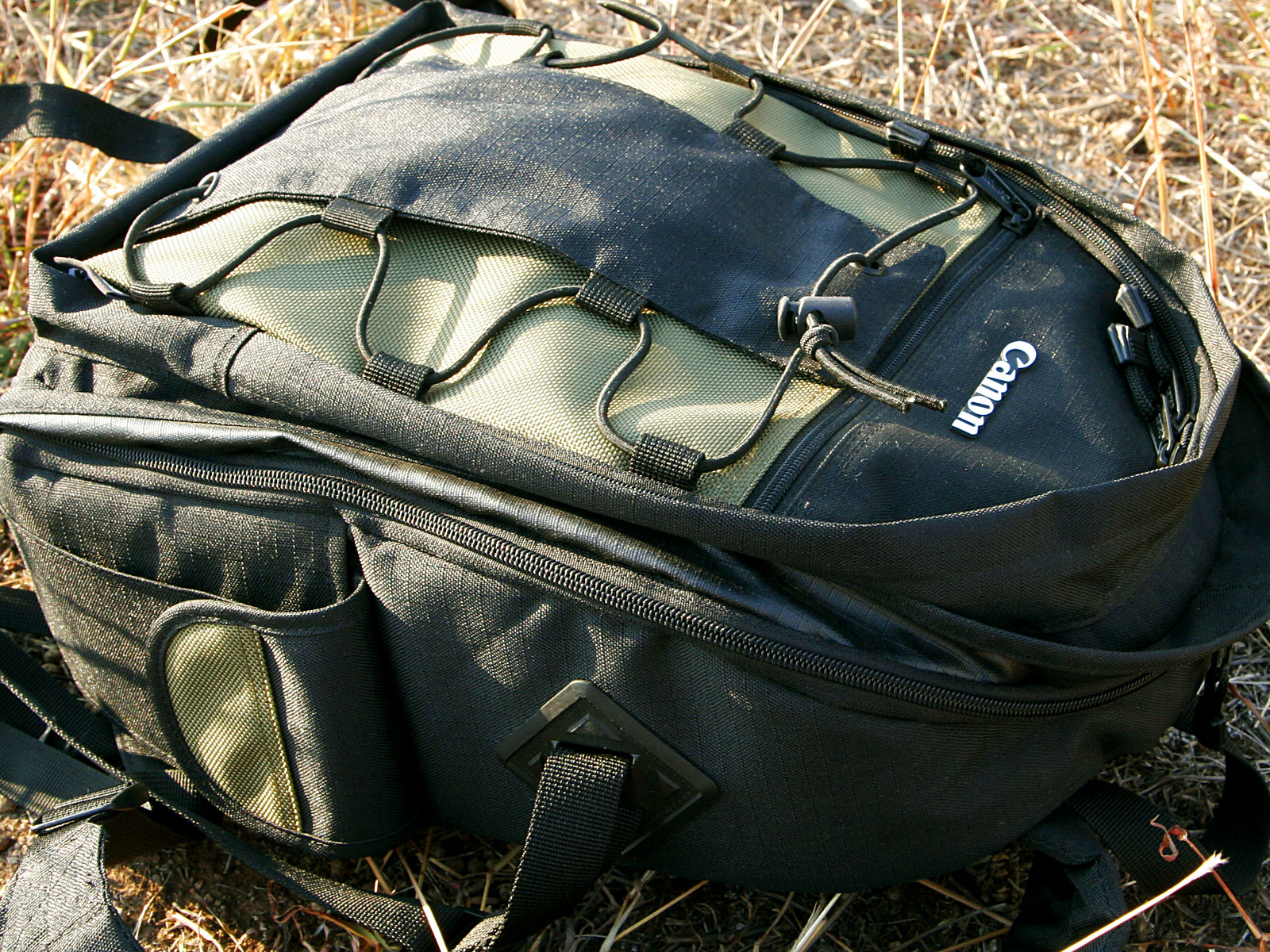
Canon Deluxe Backpack 200 EG

- Canon Deluxe Backpack 200 EG
- Canon TC 80N3 Remote Control
- BG-ED3 Battery Grip
