= Canon F series =

Canon’s F series is Canon’s series of manual focus 35 mm single lens reflex cameras. The first professional camera, the F-1, was introduced in March 1971 while the final camera, the New F-1 High Speed Motor Drive Camera, was released in February 1984. All have a Canon FD or FL lens mount compatible with Canon’s extensive range of manual-focus lenses.

== FD mount ==
	1971	1972	1973	1974	1975	1976	1977	1978	1979	1980	1981	1982	1983	1984	1985	1986	1987	1988	1989	1990	1991	1992	1993
Professional																T90							
Professional		F-1 High Speed Motor Drive Camera												New F-1 High Speed Motor Drive Camera									
Professional	F-1						F-1N / F-1 (Later Model)					New F-1											
Amateur				EF					A-1														
Amateur															T70								
Amateur	FTb			FTb-N			AE-1					AE-1 Program											
Amateur					TLb					AV-1			AL-1			T80							
Amateur					TX		AT-1							T50							T60		

=== Professional ===
- Canon F-1 (March 1971)
- Canon F-1 High Speed Motor Drive Camera (February 1972)
- Canon F-1N / Canon F-1 (Later Model) (September 1976)
- Canon New F-1 (September 1981)
- Canon New F-1 High Speed Motor Drive Camera (February 1984)

=== Amateur ===
- Canon FTb (March 1971)
- Canon FTb-N (July 1973)
- Canon EF (November 1973)
- Canon TLb (September 1974)
- Canon TX (March 1975)

== FL mount ==
	1964		1965	1966	1967	1968	1969	1970
Cameras		FX	Pellix	Pellix QL				
Cameras			FP	FT QL		TL		

- Canon FX (April 1964)
- Canon FP (October 1964)
- Canon Pellix (April 1965)
- Canon FT QL (March 1966)
- Canon Pellix QL (March 1966)
- Canon TL (February 1968)
