= Canon FT QL =

35mm single-lens reflex camera model

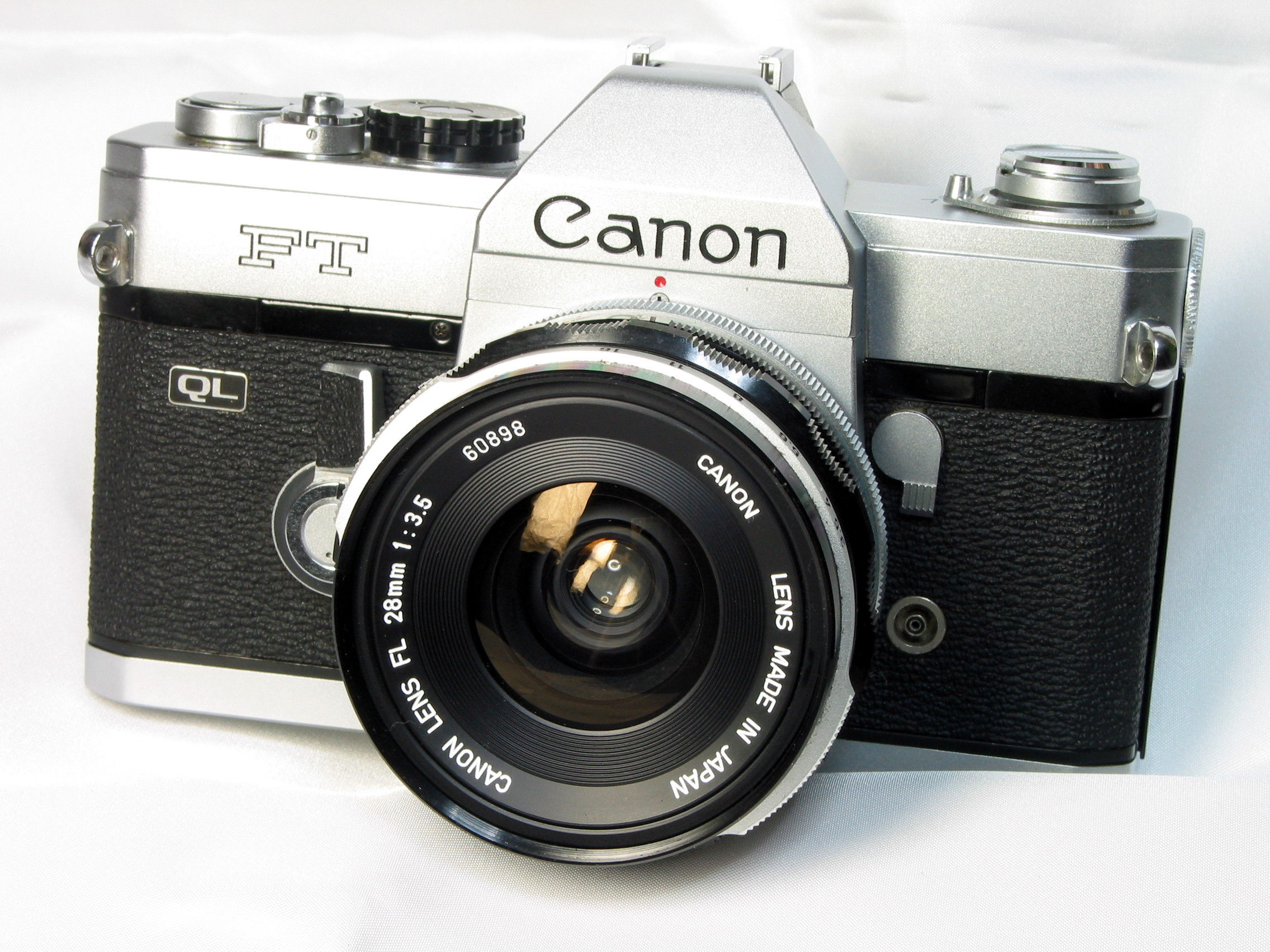
- 1966 FT QL with FL 28mm f/3.5 lens.

Overview
- Maker: Canon Inc.
- Type: Single-lens reflex
- Production: 1966 - 1972

Lens
- Lens mount: Canon FL

Sensor/medium
- Film format: 35mm
- Film size: 36 mm x 24 mm
- Film speed: ISO 25 - 2000

Shutter
- Shutter: Two-axis horizontal focal-plane cloth shutter
- Shutter speed range: 1s - 1/1000s

Viewfinder
- Viewfinder: Fixed eye-level pentaprism
- Viewfinder magnification: 0.9x

General
- Dimensions: 144×93×100 mm (5.7×3.7×3.9 in)
- Weight: 1,095 g (38.6 oz) (With FL 58mm f/1.2 mounted)
- Made in: Japan

Chronology
- Successor: Canon FTb

The Canon FT QL is a 35mm single-lens reflex camera introduced by Canon Inc. in March 1966. It has a Canon FL lens mount compatible with the large range of FL series lenses. The FT can also operate the later Canon FD series lenses in stop-down mode, but the earlier R series has a different lens aperture mechanism and cannot be used, although the bayonet fitting is similar. The standard kit lenses were Canon's 50mm f/1.8; 50mm f/1.4 and 58mm f/1.2, the body-only option was offered later.

== History ==
The FT QL was introduced in March 1966 as one of a series of three nearly identical cameras released around this time. The first was the Canon FX which had a built-in meter, but no through-the-lens (TTL) metering, instead using a window on the camera body front. The later entry level FP has no built-in meter. The FT QL was the final model at the top of this sector, and was developed to combat the growing popularity of the Pentax Spotmatic variants as well as the Topcon RE SLRs.

The camera's introductory retail price in 1966 was ¥54,800 (equivalent to ¥238,404.93 or US$1,575.02 in 2024).

The FT QL and its sisters were an important step for Canon, leading to a number of improved versions such as the FTb and the F-1 professional camera system. FT QL production ended in 1972 after the FTb was introduced.

== Features ==
The cloth focal plane shutter has speeds from 1 sec to 1/1000 and B. The electronic flash sync speed is 1/60. A delayed action timer gives an 8 – 10 second delay, using the same front of body lever that actuates the stop-down metering. The mirror can be locked up for vibration reduction or for use with special FL lenses like the original 19mm f3.5 wide angle which projects deeply into the body and would foul the mirror.

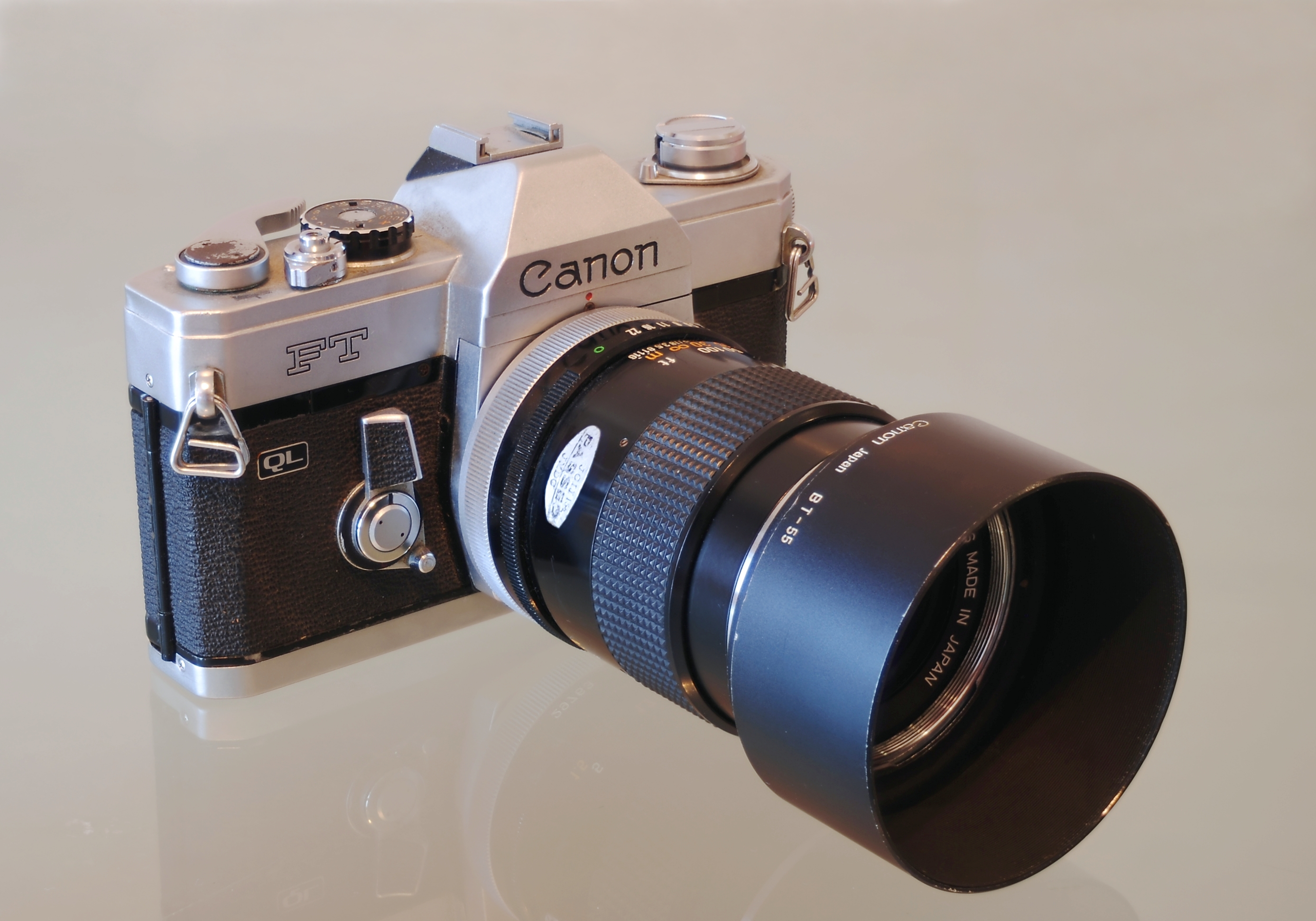
FT QL with Canon FD 135mm f/3.5 lens

The FT QL released a year after the pellicle mirrored Canon Pellix. However, it differs from the Pellix models, having a normal quick-return reflex mirror and offering stop-down TTL metering. The TTL metering is semi-spot in nature and works through a prism incorporated in the viewfinder condenser/screen assembly. The later Canon F-1 has a similar prism for metering in its removable screen. The Canon FT viewfinder screen is not user changeable. The pentaprism finder is fixed like the similar FX and FP models but unlike some earlier Canon R reflexes.

=== Quick load system ===
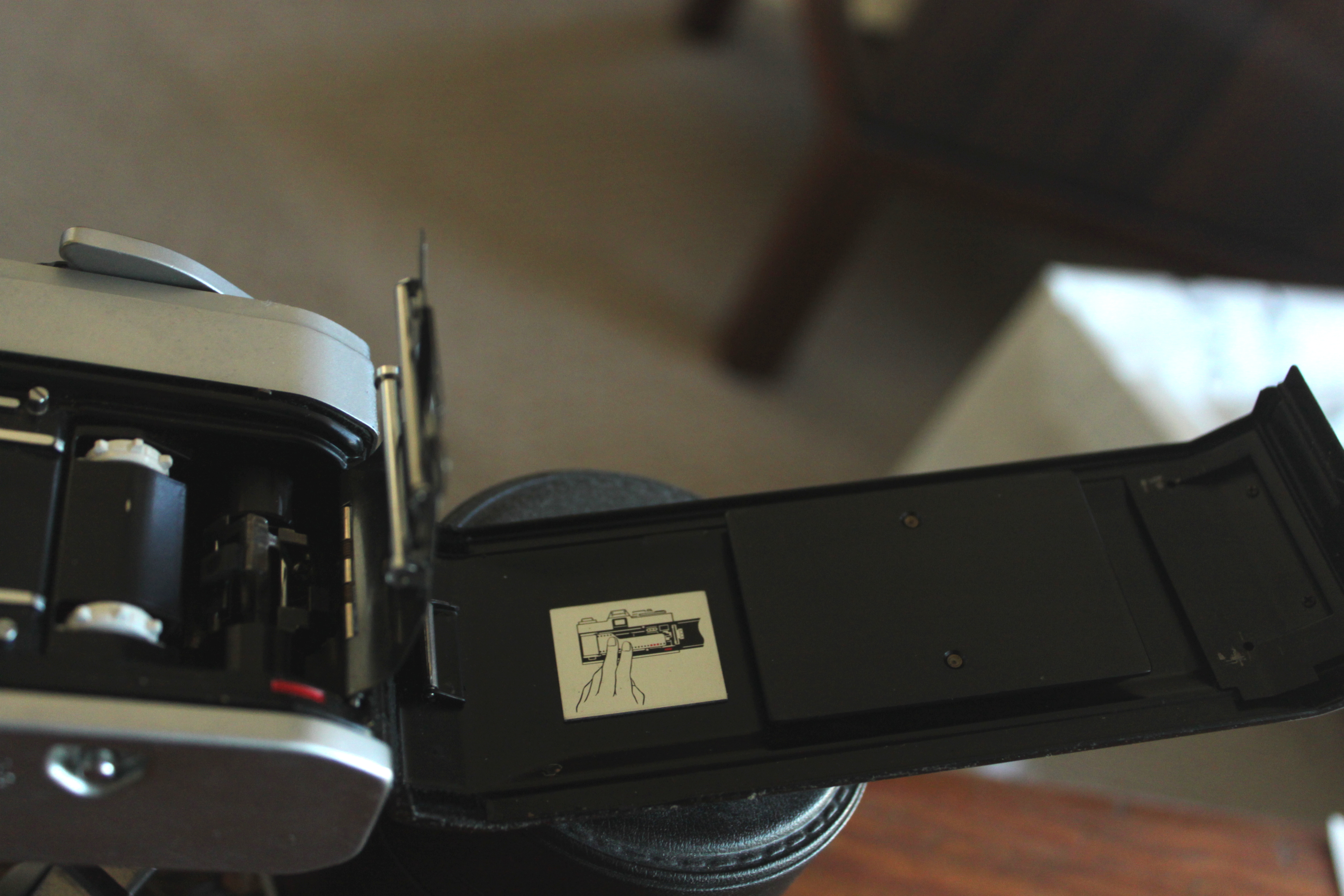
The Canon "quick loader" in a Canon FTb

The QL designation was a reference to Canon's successful "quick load" system. A stainless steel sprung hinged device inside the rear door makes film loading simpler than competing cameras of the era, allowing the user to lay the film's leader over the drive gear and take-up fingers and close the back. It also made it "repeatable" - by always putting the same sprocket hole over the drive gear, the user could rewind a partially-shot roll (leaving its leader out) and put it back in later. This allowed the user to click past the already-taken frames (with the lens cap on) and then continue. This made it possible to switch back and forth between types of film: black and white, color negative, and color slide.

=== Accessories ===
An accessory device, the Canon Booster, worked only with the FT QL and Pellix QL. It is a plug-in device that sits on the accessory shoe and increases the metering sensitivity by a factor of 16 for measuring exposure in poor light. Its operation was considered clumsy and best kept for tripod use.

== Cosmetic changes ==
During the production run of the FT QL, Canon quietly upgraded some components and made minor cosmetic changes. Some of the changes are listed below. All changes listed apply to Canon FT QL serial number 627704:

- Text font size become bolder and more legible.
- The battery charge lever font color has been changed from blue to black.
- The serial number has been relocated from the rear of the camera, next to the viewfinder, to the top plate, below the battery charge lever.
- The "Canon Camera Company. Inc." text is removed from the back of the camera.
- The "Made in Japan" text is relocated from the rear of the camera to the bottom of the camera.
- The screw-in battery compartment lid adds a coin slot for easier access.
- The film pressure plate is significantly larger for better alignment.
- The mirror lock up lever is slightly larger for easier handling.
- The circular hump is removed from the back of the camera, under the film rewind knob.
- The rear film transport area next to the shutter has an extra step for smoother operation.

	1964		1965	1966	1967	1968	1969	1970
Cameras		FX	Pellix	Pellix QL				
Cameras			FP	FT QL		TL		
