= Canon TX =

Still camera

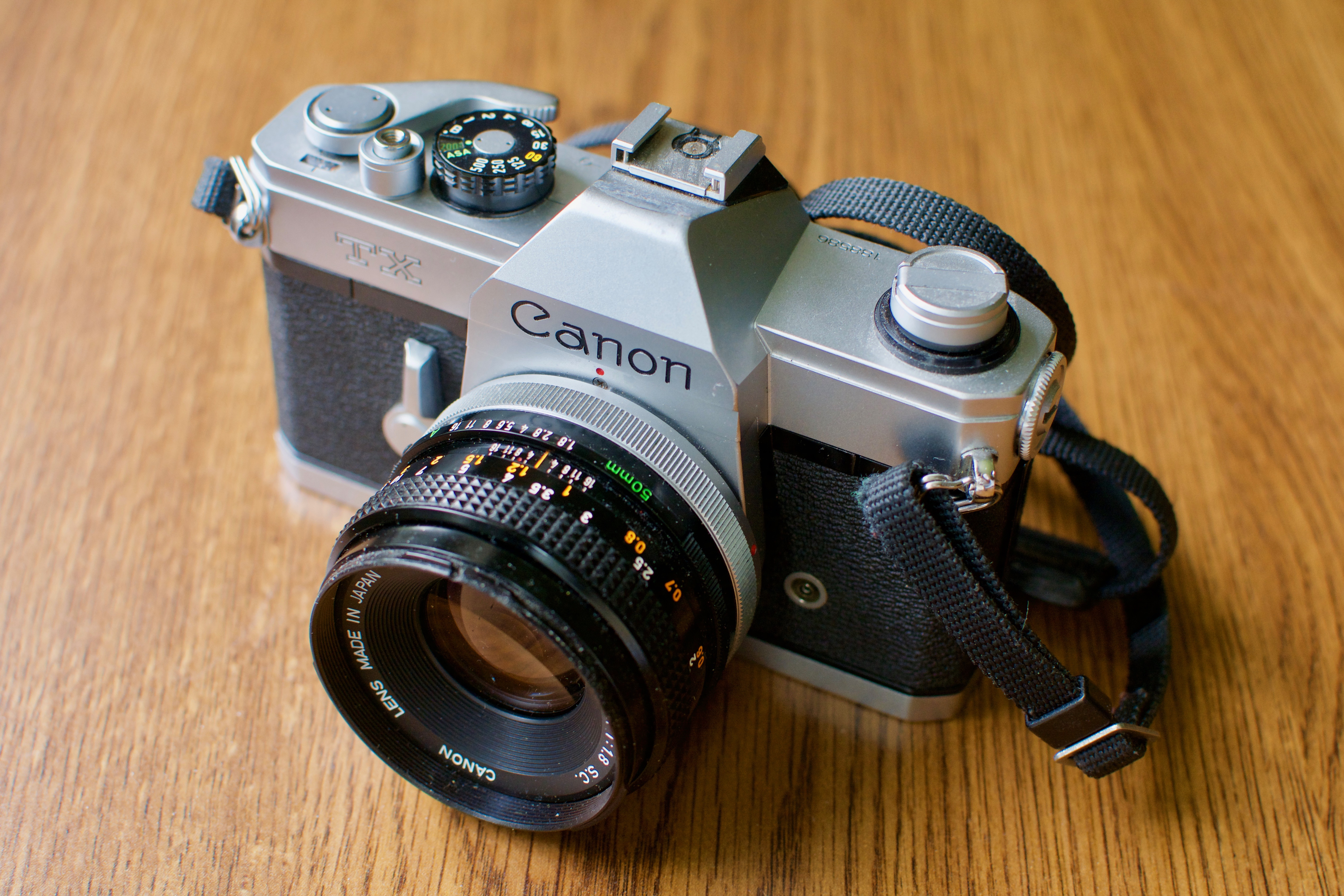
- Canon TX

Overview
- Maker: Canon
- Type: Single-lens reflex
- Released: March 1975

Lens
- Lens mount: Canon FD
- Lens: Interchangeable

Sensor/medium
- Film format: 135 film
- Film size: 36×24 mm

Focusing
- Focus: Manual

Exposure/metering
- Exposure: Manual

Flash
- Flash: Hot shoe

Shutter
- Shutter: Horizontal-travel focal-plane

Viewfinder
- Viewfinder: Fixed eye-level pentaprism
- Viewfinder magnification: 0.85×
- Frame coverage: 94%

General
- Dimensions: 144×93×43 mm (5.7×3.7×1.7 in)
- Weight: 680 g (24 oz)

References
- "TX". Canon Camera Museum.

The Canon TX is a 35mm single-lens reflex camera that was manufactured and sold by Canon of Japan from March 1975. It features a Canon FD lens mount, and is also compatible with Canon's earlier FL-mount lenses in stop-down metering mode. The TX was a cheaper version of the Canon FTb for the export market, as was the slightly earlier TLb. Compared to the TLb, the TX has a hot shoe for flash.

Compared to the FTb, the TX has a top shutter speed of only 1/500. The meter is center-weighted rather than the 12% partial meter of the FTb. It also dispenses with the self-timer and MLU of the FTb, although it does retain the depth of field preview lever and support for stopped-down metering. The TX also does not support the CAT (Canon Auto-Tuning) flash system.

It was also sold in the US as the Bell & Howell FD35.

	1971	1972	1973	1974	1975	1976	1977	1978	1979	1980	1981	1982	1983	1984	1985	1986	1987	1988	1989	1990	1991	1992	1993
Professional																T90							
Professional		F-1 High Speed Motor Drive Camera												New F-1 High Speed Motor Drive Camera									
Professional	F-1						F-1N / F-1 (Later Model)					New F-1											
Amateur				EF					A-1														
Amateur															T70								
Amateur	FTb			FTb-N			AE-1					AE-1 Program											
Amateur					TLb					AV-1			AL-1			T80							
Amateur					TX		AT-1							T50							T60		
