= Canon FL 300mm lens =

Canon FL 300mm lens refers to two telephoto prime lenses made by Canon. The lenses have an FL type mount which fits the Canon FL line of cameras.

First introduced in 1969, the FL lens replaced the R mount version, which in turn was superseded by its FD equivalent. Altogether, two variations (with two different aperture settings) were made in its short production life.

The FL-F 300mm f/5.6 was the world's first lens to use synthetic fluorite crystals in its elements; those are commonly found today in its L lens.

The f/2.8 model was used to take photographs of Henry Kissinger reading a confidential document at the Helsinki Accords. The images were so sharp that the text could be read clearly.

== Information ==
The f/5.6 FL-F was the first interchangeable lens to use calcium fluoride (CaF_{2}) on its lens elements to achieve extremely high contrast correcting chromatic aberration. It used two fluorite elements.

The main benefits of fluorite on lens is its low index of refraction and low dispersion is superior to that of optical glass. Though its optical glass wavelengths in the range from red to green is similar, it differ greatly for wavelengths in the range from green through blue, enabling a significant improvement of the imaging performance of super-telephoto lenses in terms of sharpness, contrast and color balance.

The f/5.6 FL-F are primarily designed for shooting sports, wildlife, and candids.

== Versions ==
Attribute	f/2.8 S.S.C. Fluorite	f/5.6 FL-F
Image		
Diffractive optics	No No	
Macro	No No	
Short back focus	No No	
Maximum aperture	f/2.8	f/5.6
Minimum aperture	f/32	f/22
Weight	2.340 kg	0.850 kg
Max. diameter x length	11.2 cm x 23.0 cm	0.75 cm x 16.8 cm
Filter diameter	n/a	58 mm
Horizontal viewing angle		
Vertical viewing angle		
Diagonal viewing angle		
Groups/elements	5/6	6/7
# of diaphragm blades	12	8
Closest focusing distance	3.5 m	
Release date	February 1974	March 1969
MSRP ¥	390,000	100,000

== Helsinki Accords ==
At the Helsinki Accords in July 1975, held at Finlandia Hall, freelance photographer Franco Rossi was hired to cover the event. Twenty minutes into the speech, Henry Kissinger, the United States Secretary of State at the time, opened his briefcase and took out three folders. Rossi was above him. By the time Kissinger reached a confidential section titled "Top Secret Sensitive Exclusively Eyes Only Contains Codeword", Rossi was shooting on his Canon F-1 with its Canon FL-F 300mm f/2.8 S.S.C. Fluorite equipped with an FD Extender 2X mounted on a tripod. (Note: There are discrepancies in sourced information. There is no FL-F 300mm f/2.8 S.S.C. as claimed on the official sales brochure, otherwise it is not designated as a FL-F.)

The text can be seen to the point that it is clearly readable. It depicts a report on diplomatic relations between Paris and Hanoi that was based on information from a trusted CIA source.

According to the CIA source, the French felt deceived by assurances of North Vietnam would they not invade the South. Therefore Paris refused to grant Hanoi new credits until the situation in the South clarifies and until Hanoi or Saigon makes a preliminary acknowledgement of debts contracted by the Thieu government.

This photograph was shown in La Domenica del Corriere of Italy and Nieuwe Revu of and the Netherlands. Paris Match purchased the rights to the pictures but never published them, claiming it ran out of space.

Time magazine erroneously referred to the lens as a 600 mm; a 300 mm lens combined with a 2 x teleconverter gives the focal equivalent of a 600 mm lens. The Canon 600 mm lens available at the time was a non-fluorite model with an aperture of f/5.6.
