= Canon EF camera =

1973–1978 single-lens reflex camera

Canon EF

Overview
- Maker: Canon Camera K. K.
- Type: 35 mm SLR
- Released: 1973
- Production: 1973-1978

Lens
- Lens mount: Canon FD lens mount

Sensor/medium
- Recording medium: 135 film

Focusing
- Focus: manual

Exposure/metering
- Exposure: manual, shutter priority

General
- Dimensions: 147×99×48 mm (5.8×3.9×1.9 in)
- Weight: 760 g (27 oz)

The Canon EF is a manual focus 35mm single-lens reflex camera produced by Canon between 1973 and 1978. It was compatible with Canon's FD-mount lenses. The EF was built as an electro-mechanical version of Canon's top-of-the-line, wholly mechanical Canon F-1. The shutter is mechanical at all speeds ½ second and faster, but at 1 second and longer the shutter is all electronically controlled, allowing AE exposures from 1/1000 to 30 seconds. The EF shares the F-1's rugged construction and tough metal body. Unlike the F-1, the EF does not support any motor drive for film transport. Neither does it provide any interchangeable viewfinder.

== Features ==
The Canon EF contained a silicon photocell light meter with a range of EV 18 to EV -2 which measured light in a "central emphasis metering" pattern (also called center weighted average metering) with less influence from the top of the frame, to minimize underexposure due to a bright skyline. Note that this requires the camera to be held horizontally; taking vertically oriented pictures requires some care by the user. The Canon EF could operate "Variable Aperture AE" mode (commonly called shutter priority) or full manual mode, where the operator would control both the shutter speed and the aperture. When used in automatic mode, it's possible to lock the current aperture value, then recompose the picture, if desired, by pressing the small silver button next to the film rewind knob.

Automatic exposure required the FD-mount lenses. In 1975, the range of FD lenses available spanned from 15 mm fisheye to 300 mm telephoto, including three zoom lenses. Using manual exposure and stopped down metering, the Canon EF could also be used with the older FL-mount and R-mount lenses.

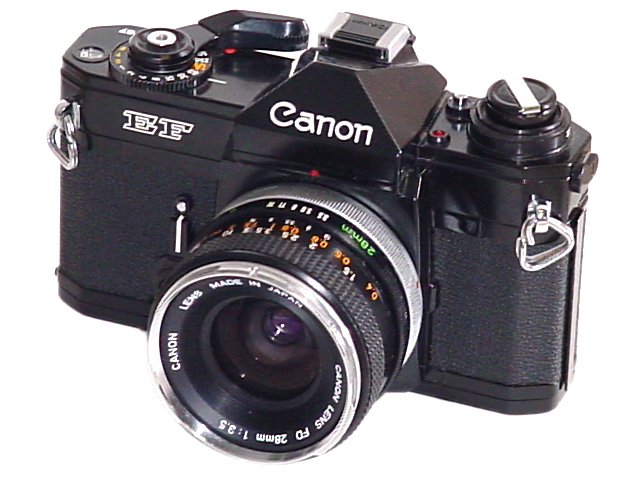
A Canon EF with 28mm Canon FD Lens

The EF used a unique shutter among Canon's 35mm SLRs: a Copal Square vertical-travel metal blade focal plane shutter. Unusually long exposures (from 1 second to 30 seconds) were electronically controlled, while shorter ones (1/1000 second to ½ second) were mechanically controlled. This was very useful in conserving battery power, and allowed one to use the camera even with dead batteries. The light metering system's power switch turned on the meter, removed the lock from the shutter trigger button and let the film advance lever pop out 15 degrees from the camera body, all in one flick of the thumb. In the axis of the main switch, a multiple exposure button is located. Pressing this while cocking the shutter prevents advancing the film. The frame counter is also blocked, thus preserving the correct frame count. At the time, most cameras did not support longer exposure times than about one second, without having to use the bulb setting. Maybe this was why Canon placed a red LED to the left of the pentaprism, and had the LED flashing as long as the electronic shutter timer was running. The LED was also used for battery check.

The film advance lever, though it stands out from the body when the shutter lock button is released, has a soft spring that allows the lever to be pressed back in to the body during use, without turning off the meter, and therefore does not hinder left-eye users shooting in landscape format. Another useful feature is that, when advancing a fresh film to the first frame, the user can do so with three rapid strokes of the lever but without the need to release the shutter after each stroke.

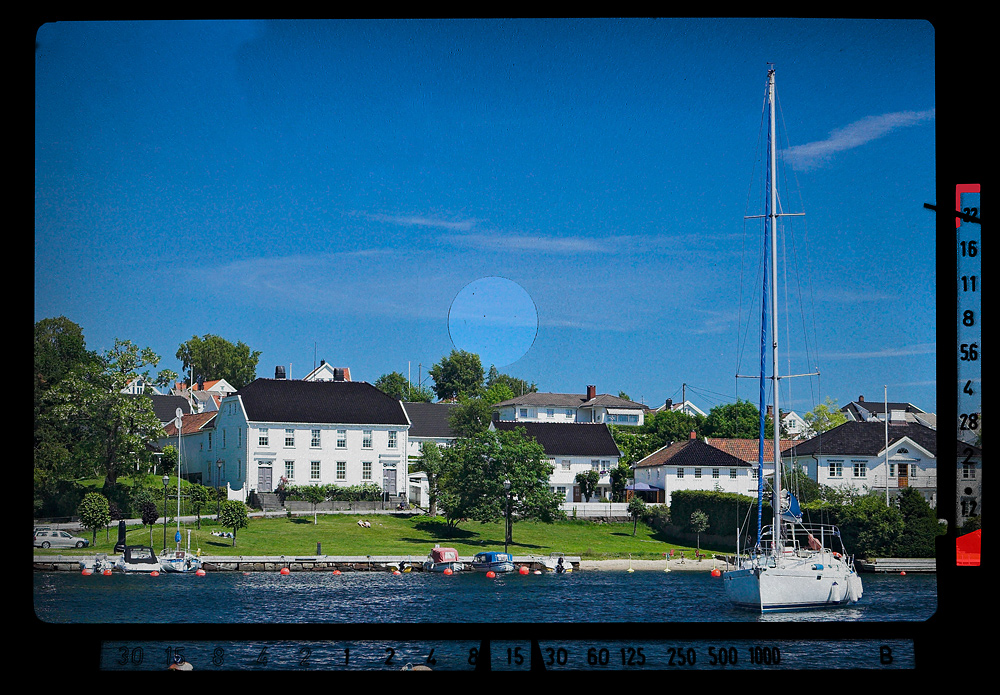
Image seen though the finder

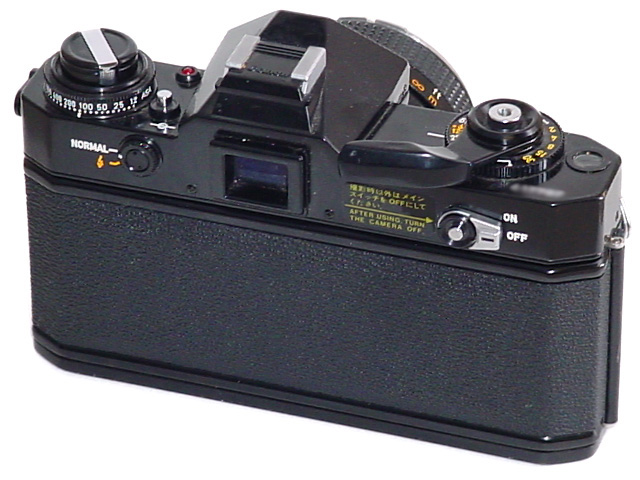
Rear view of a Canon EF

The focusing screen of the Canon EF cannot be replaced by the user. Early models feature a microprism circle, the later a split image screen with a microprism ring around it. Typical of the era, all viewfinder information is provided by mechanical arrangements, which are projected into the viewfinder by optics inside the camera housing. The range of selectable shutter speeds are always visible at the bottom of the viewfinder, with a fork outlining the currently selected speed. To the right is a scale with the aperture setting, where a needle points at the aperture the camera's exposure meter selects, and also automatically sets, provided the FD lens or FD new lens is set to the green A symbol (or green on older lenses). The largest opening the used lens is capable of is always properly shown, by shifting the whole scale up or down. The range goes from 1.2 to 5.6, in order to suit lenses from the Canon FD 55 mm 1:1.2 ASPHERICAL S.S.C. to the Canon FD 300 mm 1:5.6 S.C. The smallest aperture is not adjusted for. The camera always displays apertures up to f/22, but with a red line down to f/16, to remind the user that some lenses, like the Canon FD 50 mm 1:1.4 S.S.C. has its smallest aperture at f/16, while some, like the Canon FD 135 mm 1:2.5 S.C. can stop down to f/22. Later, when the Canon FD new lenses became available, the camera couldn't properly represent the new smallest aperture, like f/32. You had to estimate along the scale. The exposure scale also has a stopped down metering mark, where the needle should be aligned when using stopped down metering. Due to corrections taken for proper exposure with full aperture metering, stopped down metering with larger apertures than f/2.8 was not reliable.

Powering the electro-mechanical shutter and light meter were two PX 625 1.35 volt mercury batteries, but the camera has a voltage regulator which allows the use of 1.5 volt batteries. The EF is the only camera in the manual focus Canon line of the 1960s and 1970s (which includes the FTb, the F-1, and the FT) that can be used with common 1.5 volt batteries without modification to the internal electronics.

Like all pre-1987 Canon SLR's, the EF accepted Canon FD mount lenses. The shutter speed range was 1/1000 of a second to 30 seconds (the 15 & 30 second settings actually give 16 and 32 seconds, thus preserving the doubling sequence), plus bulb. The X-sync was 1/125th of a second. The camera included setting for film speeds of 12 ASA to 3200 ASA.

The EF also featured a self-timer and a stop-down metering mode which could also be used for momentary depth-of-field preview. Stopped down metering must be used with older Canon FL lenses. The mirror can also be locked up for long exposures, to minimise shutter-induced camera shake. All these features are accessed via the lever on the front of the camera.

| | 1971 | 1972 | 1973 | 1974 | 1975 | 1976 | 1977 | 1978 | 1979 | 1980 | 1981 | 1982 | 1983 | 1984 | 1985 | 1986 | 1987 | 1988 | 1989 | 1990 | 1991 | 1992 | 1993 |
| Professional | | | | | | | | | | | | | | | | T90 | | | | | | | |
| Professional | | F-1 High Speed Motor Drive Camera | | | | | | | | | | | | New F-1 High Speed Motor Drive Camera | | | | | | | | | |
| Professional | F-1 | | | | | | F-1N / F-1 (Later Model) | | | | | New F-1 | | | | | | | | | | | |
| Amateur | | | | EF | | | | | A-1 | | | | | | | | | | | | | | |
| Amateur | | | | | | | | | | | | | | | T70 | | | | | | | | |
| Amateur | FTb | | | FTb-N | | | AE-1 | | | | | AE-1 Program | | | | | | | | | | | |
| Amateur | | | | | TLb | | | | | AV-1 | | | AL-1 | | | T80 | | | | | | | |
| Amateur | | | | | TX | | AT-1 | | | | | | | T50 | | | | | | | T60 | | |
