= TLB =

TLB may refer to:

== Science and technology ==
- Adaptive transmit load balancing or balance-tlb, a Linux bonding driver mode
- Canon TLb, a 35 mm camera
- Translation lookaside buffer, a computer memory cache
- Turcicum Leaf Blight, also known as Northern corn leaf blight

== Transport ==
- Atlas Atlantique Airlines (ICAO airline code), France
- Talybont railway station (National Rail station code), Gwynedd, Wales

== Other uses ==
- Army Top Level Budget, the responsibility of the UK Deputy Chief of the General Staff
- The Living Bible, a personal paraphrase of the Bible
