= Canon TLb =

Still camera

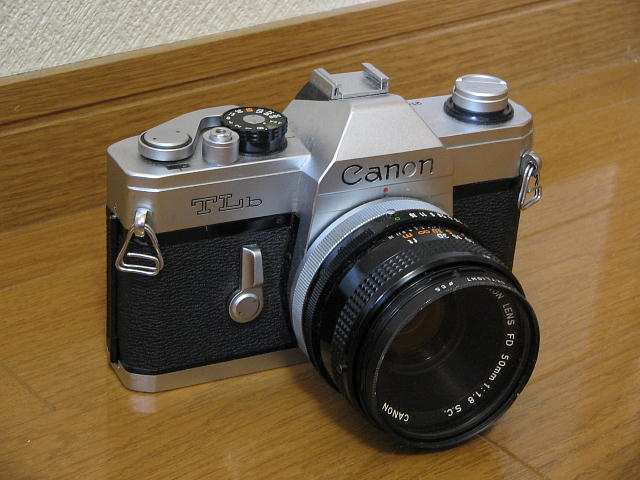
Canon TLb

The Canon TLb is a 35 mm single-lens reflex camera introduced by Canon in September 1974. It features a Canon FD lens mount, and is also compatible with Canon's earlier FL-mount lenses in stop-down metering mode. The TLb was a cheaper version of the Canon FTb for the export market, as was the slightly later TX. Compared to the TX, the hot shoe was omitted, although the camera included a PC terminal for flash sync. The TLb was later (April 1976) sold in Japan.

== Gallery ==
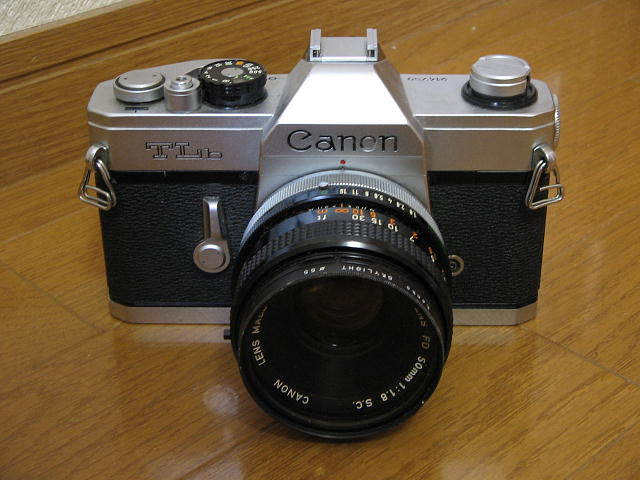

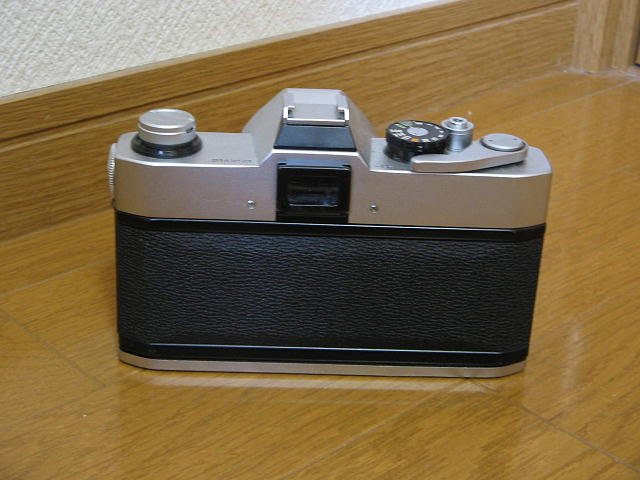

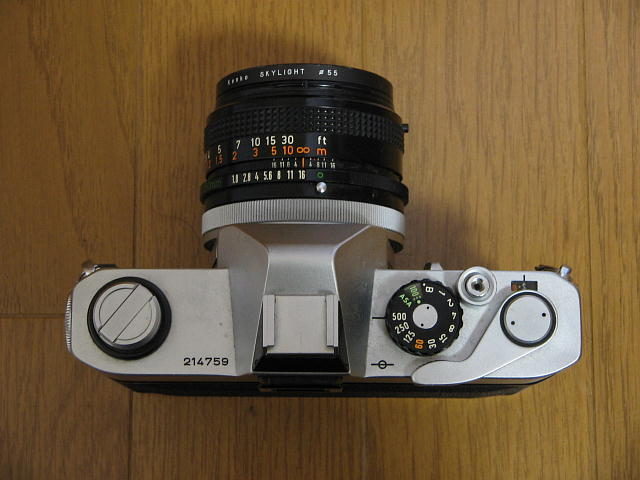

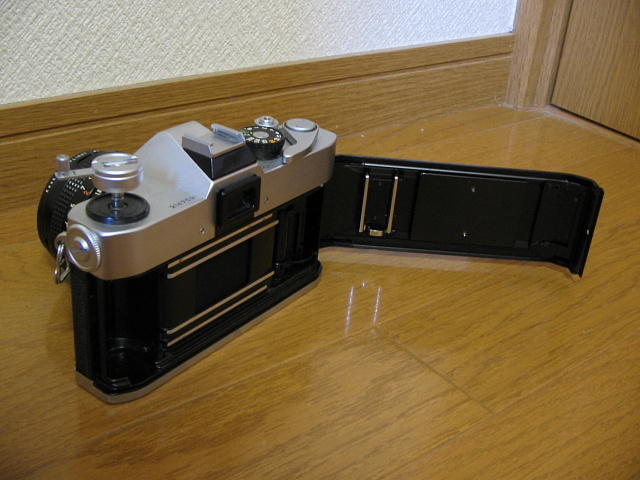

| | 1971 | 1972 | 1973 | 1974 | 1975 | 1976 | 1977 | 1978 | 1979 | 1980 | 1981 | 1982 | 1983 | 1984 | 1985 | 1986 | 1987 | 1988 | 1989 | 1990 | 1991 | 1992 | 1993 |
| Professional | | | | | | | | | | | | | | | | T90 | | | | | | | |
| Professional | | F-1 High Speed Motor Drive Camera | | | | | | | | | | | | New F-1 High Speed Motor Drive Camera | | | | | | | | | |
| Professional | F-1 | | | | | | F-1N / F-1 (Later Model) | | | | | New F-1 | | | | | | | | | | | |
| Amateur | | | | EF | | | | | A-1 | | | | | | | | | | | | | | |
| Amateur | | | | | | | | | | | | | | | T70 | | | | | | | | |
| Amateur | FTb | | | FTb-N | | | AE-1 | | | | | AE-1 Program | | | | | | | | | | | |
| Amateur | | | | | TLb | | | | | AV-1 | | | AL-1 | | | T80 | | | | | | | |
| Amateur | | | | | TX | | AT-1 | | | | | | | T50 | | | | | | | T60 | | |
