= Canon FTb =

1971 35mm single-lens reflex camera

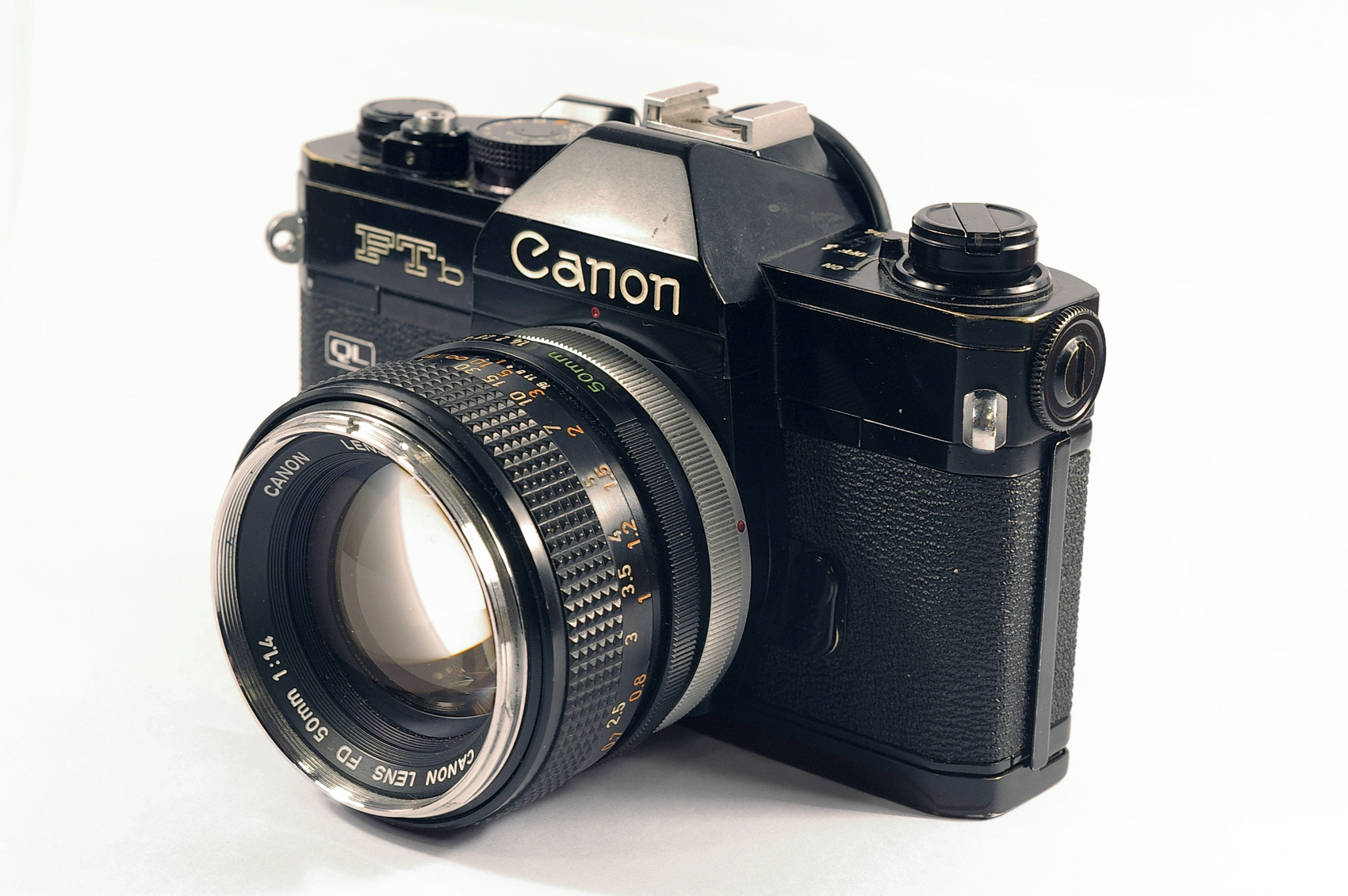

Overview
- Maker: Canon
- Type: 35 mm Single-lens reflex still camera
- Released: 1971 Canon FTb; 1973 Canon FTbn
- Production: 1971-1976

Lens
- Lens: Canon FD-mount interchangeable
- F-numbers: On default 50 mm lens: f/1.4, f/2, f/2.8, f/4, f/5.6, f/8, f/11, f/16

Sensor/medium
- Sensor type: 135 film
- Sensor size: 24×36 mm
- Recording medium: 135 film

Focusing
- Focus: Manual

Shutter
- Shutter speeds: X, B, 1, 1/2, 1/4, 1/8, 1/15, 1/30, 1/60, 1/125, 1/250, 1/500, 1/1000 sec.

General
- Dimensions: 144×93×43 mm (5.7×3.7×1.7 in)
- Weight: 750 g (26 oz)

The Canon FTb is a 35 mm single-lens reflex camera manufactured by Canon of Japan from March 1971 replacing the Canon FT QL. It features a Canon FD lens mount, and is also compatible with Canon's earlier FL-mount lenses in stop-down metering mode. Launched alongside the top-of-the-line F-1, the FTb was the mass-market camera in the range. Its QL designation referred to the Quick Load feature introduced by the FT-QL (more fully-described in the article about that camera) which allowed changing film in the middle of the roll to change types of film, as well as making film loading easier.

== History ==
The FTb was primarily intended to be a camera for the advanced amateur photographer, offering many of the same features and same build quality as the F-1, but without the option of interchangeable prisms, focusing screens, or motor drives. The Canon FTb was released in Japan at a retail price of ¥35,000 (equivalent to ¥105,704 in 2019) for the camera body, and US$99 (equivalent to $768.65 in 2024) in the United States.

When the FTb entered the US market, it was only available through Sears.

In 1973, the FTb design was revised slightly. The camera was given a plastic tipped film advance lever. The stop down lever was changed to the same style as that found on the F-1. The PC sync socket was given a spring-loaded plastic cover. The ring around the outer edge of the shutter speed dial was changed from a scalloped design to a diamond textured design. Finally, a shutter speed display was added in the lower left hand corner of the viewfinder. This model was marketed as the FTb-N, although the camera's nameplate did not reflect this.

== Specifications ==
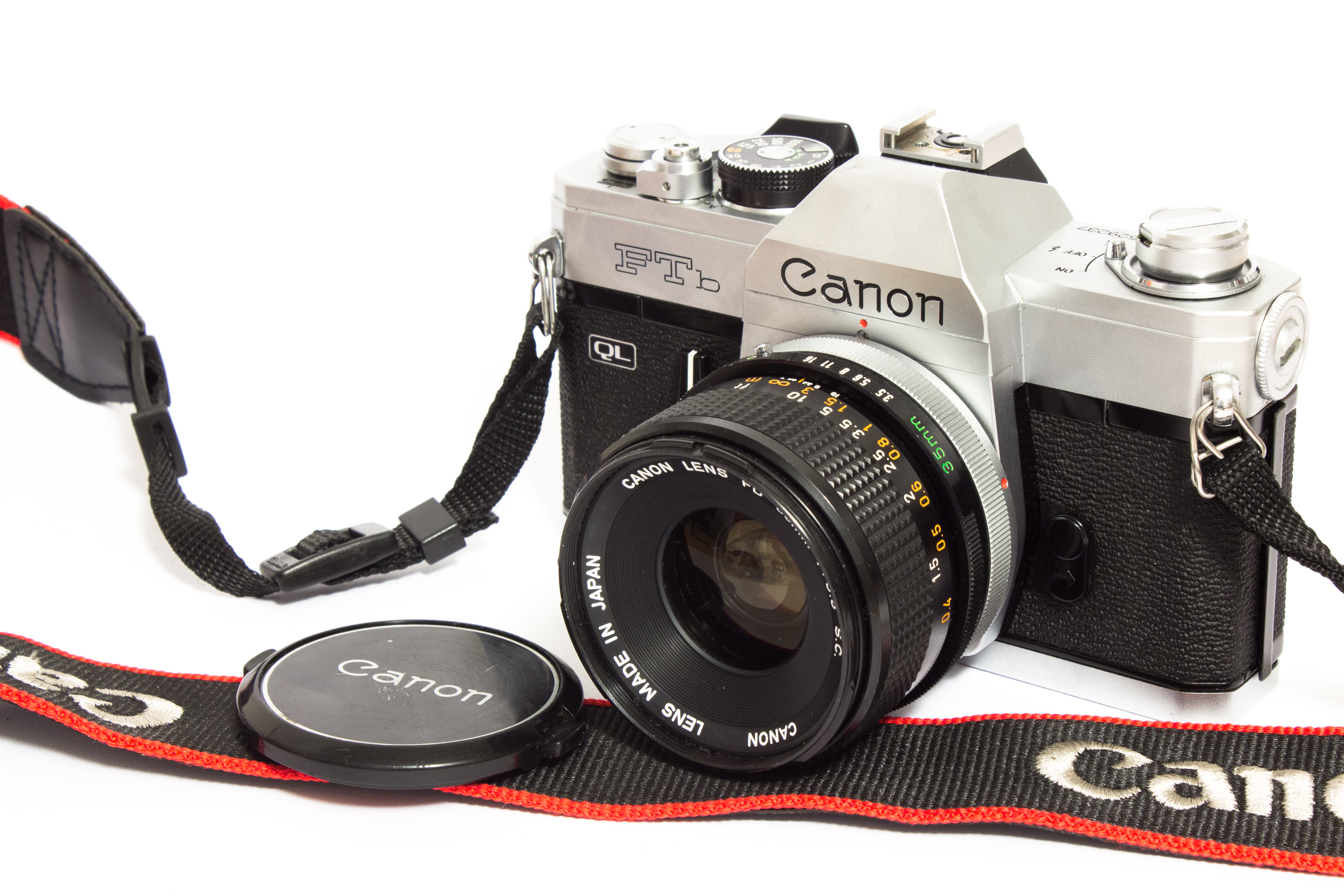
Canon FTb in silver.

The FTb has an all-mechanical horizontally traveling focal plane shutter with timed speeds from 1/1000 to 1 second and bulb. The FTb has rubberized silk shutter curtains rather than the more durable but more expensive titanium curtains found on the F-1.

It offers a 10-second self-timer, as well as mirror lock-up.

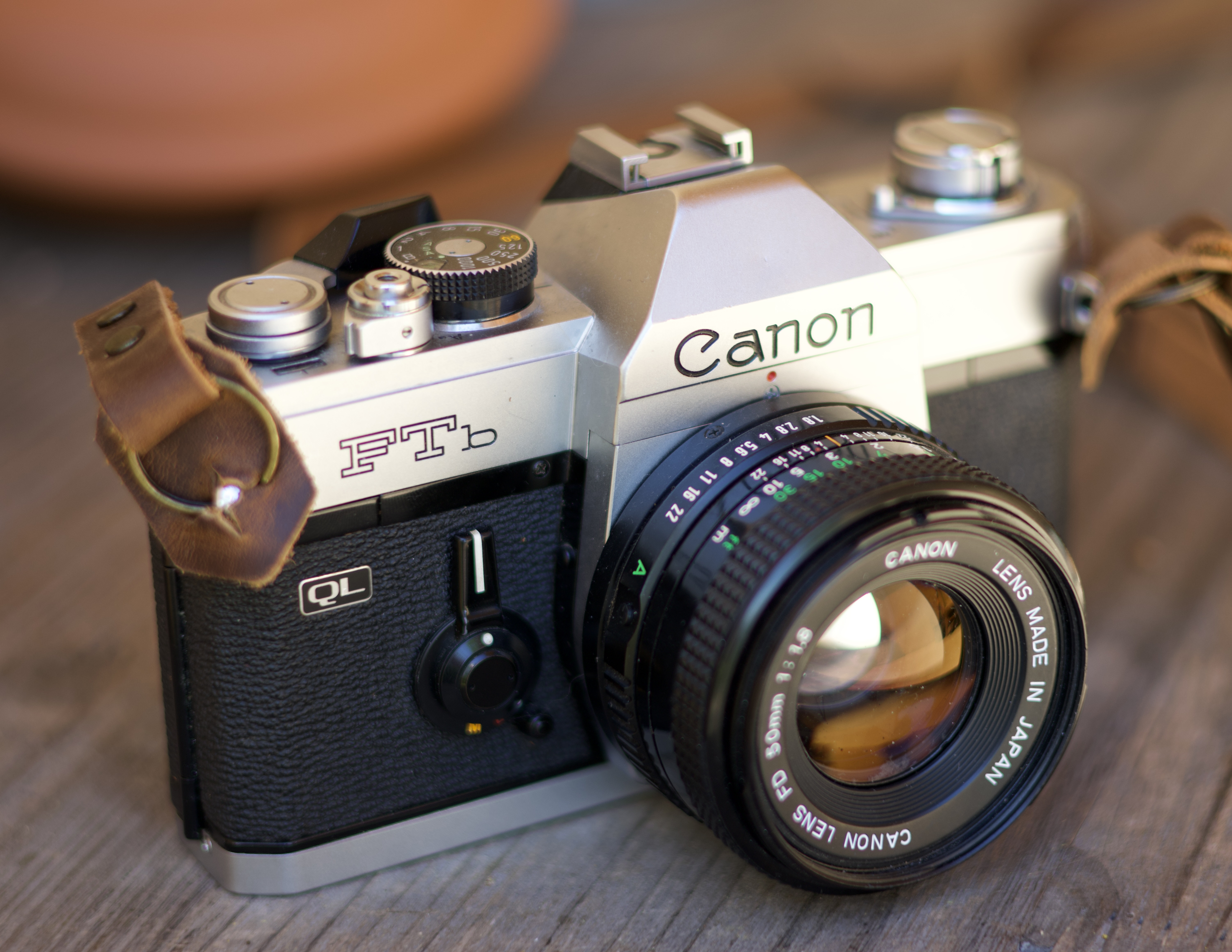
Canon FTb with 50mm F/1.8 lens

The meter is of the 12% (1/9) partial type with the metering area indicated by a slightly darkened box in the center of the finder area. It is fully coupled to shutter speed dial and aperture ring on FD lenses in the match needle style. The meter was designed to be powered by a single 1.35 volt 625-type mercury cell, specifically the Mallory PX-625 and the Eveready EPX-625. While these batteries are obsolete, modern replacements include the Wein zinc-air cell PX625, available at large online retailers. Alternative options for replacement are to use a 1.5 volt silver battery either through a voltage dropping adapter or recalibrating the meter. Using modern zinc air batteries provide the original voltage, but have a relatively short life.

== See also ==
- List of Canon products

	1971	1972	1973	1974	1975	1976	1977	1978	1979	1980	1981	1982	1983	1984	1985	1986	1987	1988	1989	1990	1991	1992	1993
Professional																T90							
Professional		F-1 High Speed Motor Drive Camera												New F-1 High Speed Motor Drive Camera									
Professional	F-1						F-1N / F-1 (Later Model)					New F-1											
Amateur				EF					A-1														
Amateur															T70								
Amateur	FTb			FTb-N			AE-1					AE-1 Program											
Amateur					TLb					AV-1			AL-1			T80							
Amateur					TX		AT-1							T50							T60		
