= Canon FL 1200mm lens =

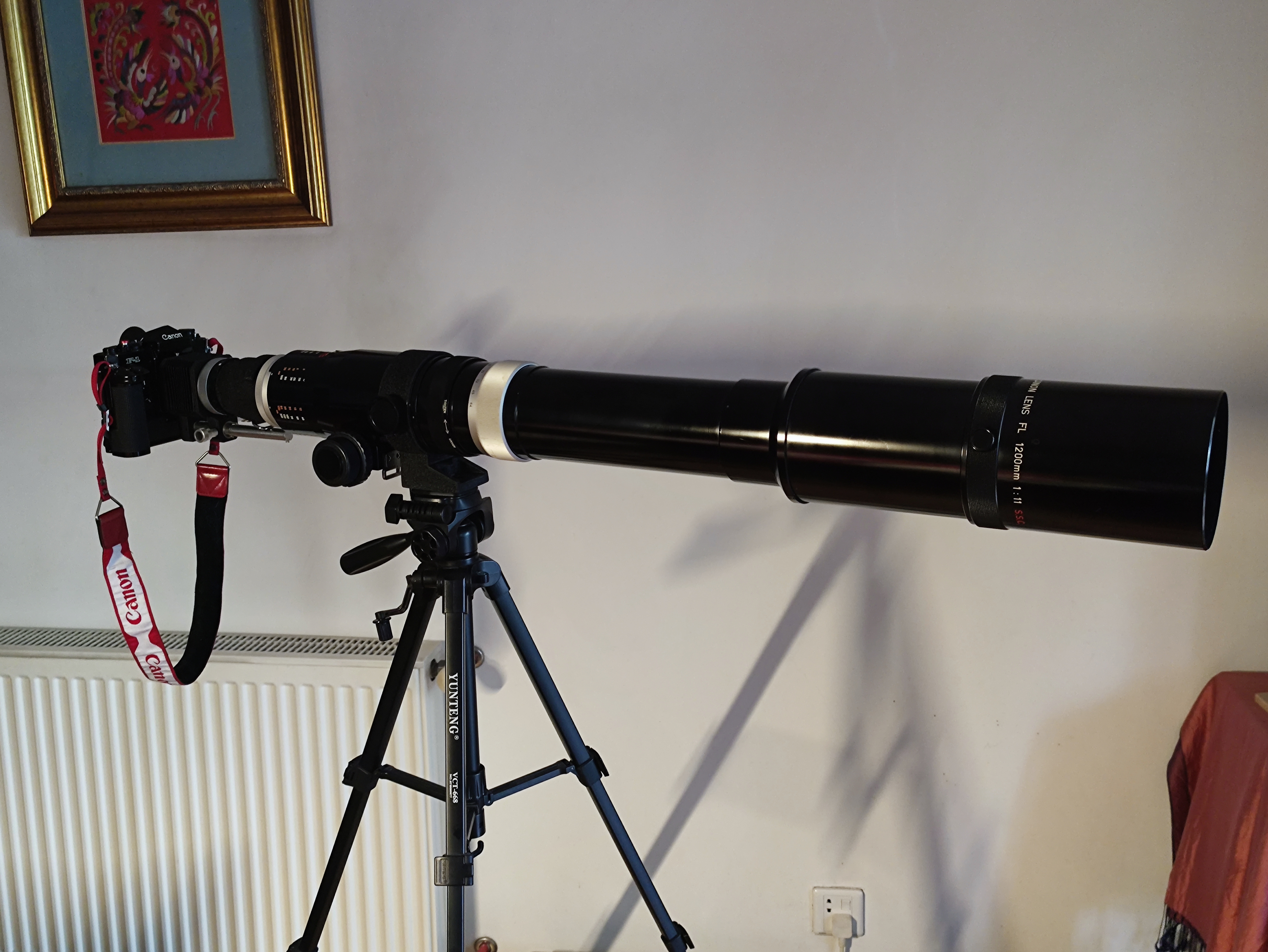
Canon FL 1200mm lens

The Canon FL 1200mm f/11 was a super-telephoto lens marketed by Japanese optical manufacturer Canon in June 1972. It was the longest super-telephoto lens in the Canon FL system.

The lens was part of a group of four convertible lenses: 400mm f/5.6, 600mm f/5.6, 800mm f/8, and the 1200mm f/11. The lenses were in two parts: a focusing and aperture control section which mounted directly to the camera using the Canon FL breech-lock bayonet mounting ring; and the head end, which determined the focal length of the lens. The control section was common to each of the four head-end sections. The 1200mm head end was a preset aperture type, so the lens had to be stopped down manually for exposure.

There are three versions, the original version has 6 elements, the second and third has 7 elements. Only the latest version was marked with "S.S.C.", which means Super Spectra Coating. The original FL 1200mm is now a rare and very valuable collector's item.

== Technical data ==
- Lens construction: 7 elements in 5 groups
- Weight: 6200g/14000g (with case)
- Focus adjustment: Manual focus
- Aperture range: f/11-64
- Closest focusing distance: 40m / 131ft
- Filter size: 48mm (rear drop-in)
