= Canon Pellix =

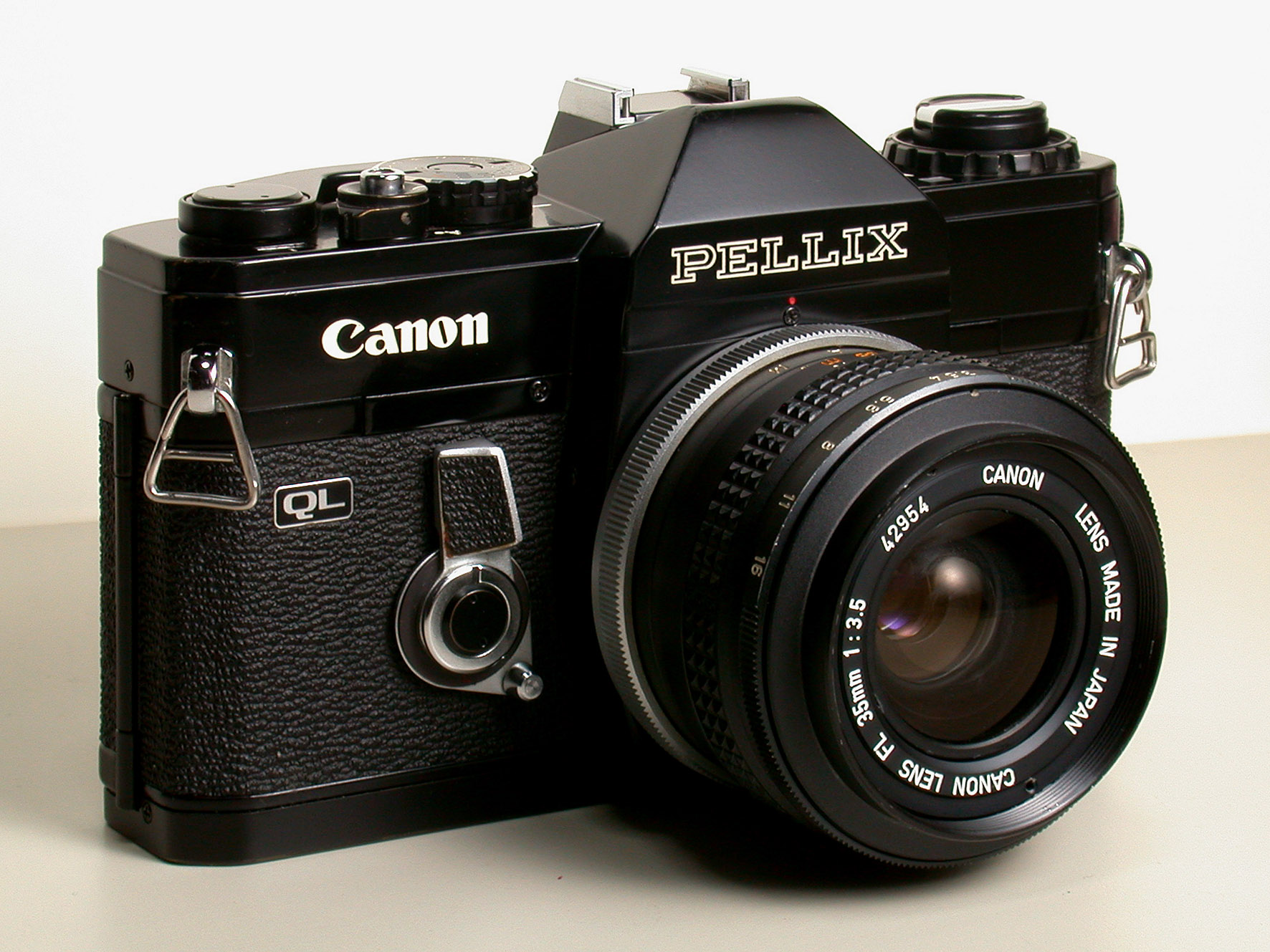
Canon Pellix

The Canon Pellix is a manual-focus single-lens reflex (SLR) camera released in 1965 that uses a stationary half-silvered mirror behind which a metering cell is raised during light level metering.

== The First Canon with TTL ==
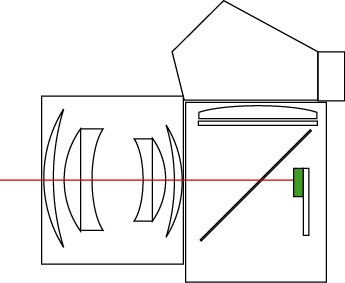

Canon suddenly switched from professionally oriented SLR cameras to advanced amateur cameras in March 1964, when they left the Canon Canonflex range and launched the Canon FX with the FL lens mount. It has a built in CdS exposure meter with a circular window on the right-hand camera front. The Canon FP without exposure meter was added later the same year. The cameras were well built, but the metering technology was several years behind the Minolta SR-7, which had pioneered that technology in 1962. Then, just half a year later in the spring of 1965, Canon surprised the camera community with the remarkable Pellix. The new camera featured the much-expected TTL exposure metering facility, albeit employing the stop-down metering method.

However, what makes the Pellix special, is that the TTL metering is accomplished using a stationary semitransparent pellicle reflex mirror instead of the usual moving SLR mirror, and placing a CdS meter cell behind it for the TTL exposure measurement. The cell is attached to an arm that swings up in front of the film gate when the stop-down lever on the right-hand camera front is pressed, making a match-needle reading of the light projected from the camera lens after passing through the semitransparent mirror. Very few alternative locations inside the camera were available for picking up light rays from the camera lens. The Topcon RE Super has its meter cell placed directly behind the reflex mirror into which a pattern of slits are cut to let the light though, while the Asahi Pentax Spotmatic has a pair of cells located on either side of the finder window, reading light off the focusing screen.

The stop-down lever at the right-hand camera front operates the self-timer when pushed upwards instead of pressed down. As with the Canon FX and FP, the camera back is opened turning a key at the base. The film speed is set lifting and turning the rim of the shutter speed dial. The camera is designed to use the now-obsolete 1.35 volt mercury battery, which may be directly replaced by a similar-sized 1.4 volt hearing aid battery which is usable for about a year after activation, whether used or not. The battery compartment is at the left-hand edge of the camera, next to the rewind knob. The Pellix was replaced by the improved Canon Pellix QL first marketed in March 1966. Improvements included the addition of a quick film-loading mechanism and contacts in the base of the battery compartment for a separately available electronic booster for the internal exposure meter.

=== The pellicle mirror ===
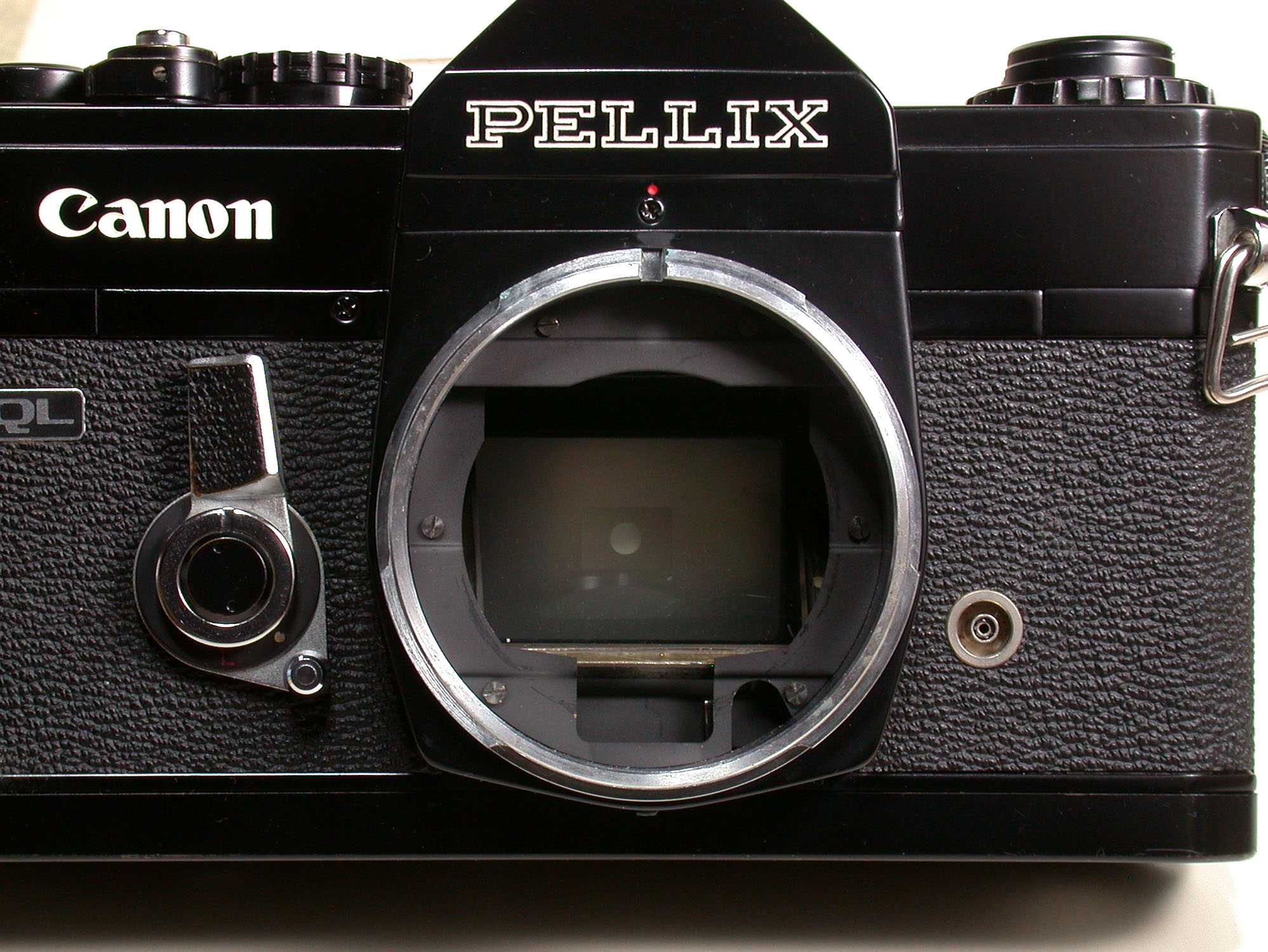
The pellicle mirror

The semitransparent fixed mirror in the Pellix, for the first time successfully used in a 35mm SLR camera, lets about two-thirds (66%) of the light from the lens pass directly through to the film, while the rest is reflected to the viewfinder.

This arrangement supports TTL metering, provides simpler construction and quieter operation, and does not black out the viewfinder during exposure. Disadvantages include loss of light, about one half stop (- 0.5 EV) in the exposure, through the semitransparent mirror, and about one and three-fourths stop (- 1.7 EV) dimmer finder compared to a fully reflecting mirror. A more serious problem is that the image-forming light rays must pass through the stationary pellicle mirror, which over time accumulates dirt, scattering light and degrading the image. When the mirror becomes dirty, or damaged, it must be replaced.

While the finder does not go black during exposure, at small lens apertures the eye has no time to adjust to the dark finder. The operating noise from the Pellix is surprisingly similar to that of the Canon FX, despite not having a moving reflex mirror. Canon made two fast lenses, the FL 50mm 1:1.4 and the FL 58mm 1:1.2, in order to compensate for the light loss. As the shutter curtain is permanently exposed to light without being protected by a moving mirror, a metal, rather than fabric curtain is used, which prevents the possibility of burning by being accidentally pointed at the sun, with the large lens focussing its rays on the curtain. Another risk is light reaching the film through the finder window during exposure as there is no raised mirror to block it. This is avoided by a finder blind operated by turning the ring under the rewind knob, especially useful when leaving the camera on a stand. The Meter circuit is susceptible to breakage due to the CdS meter arm being moved into position behind the pellicle mirror during exposure reading. A special lens was made available for the Canon Pellix, the FLP 38mm 1:2.8, utilising the fact the camera has a stationary mirror that will not hit the lens' rear element. The FLP code indicates that this lens is exclusively to be used on Pellix camera.

== See also ==
- Sony SLT camera, a similar technology

	1964		1965	1966	1967	1968	1969	1970
Cameras		FX	Pellix	Pellix QL				
Cameras			FP	FT QL		TL		
