= Canon F-1 =

1971 35mm single-lens reflex camera

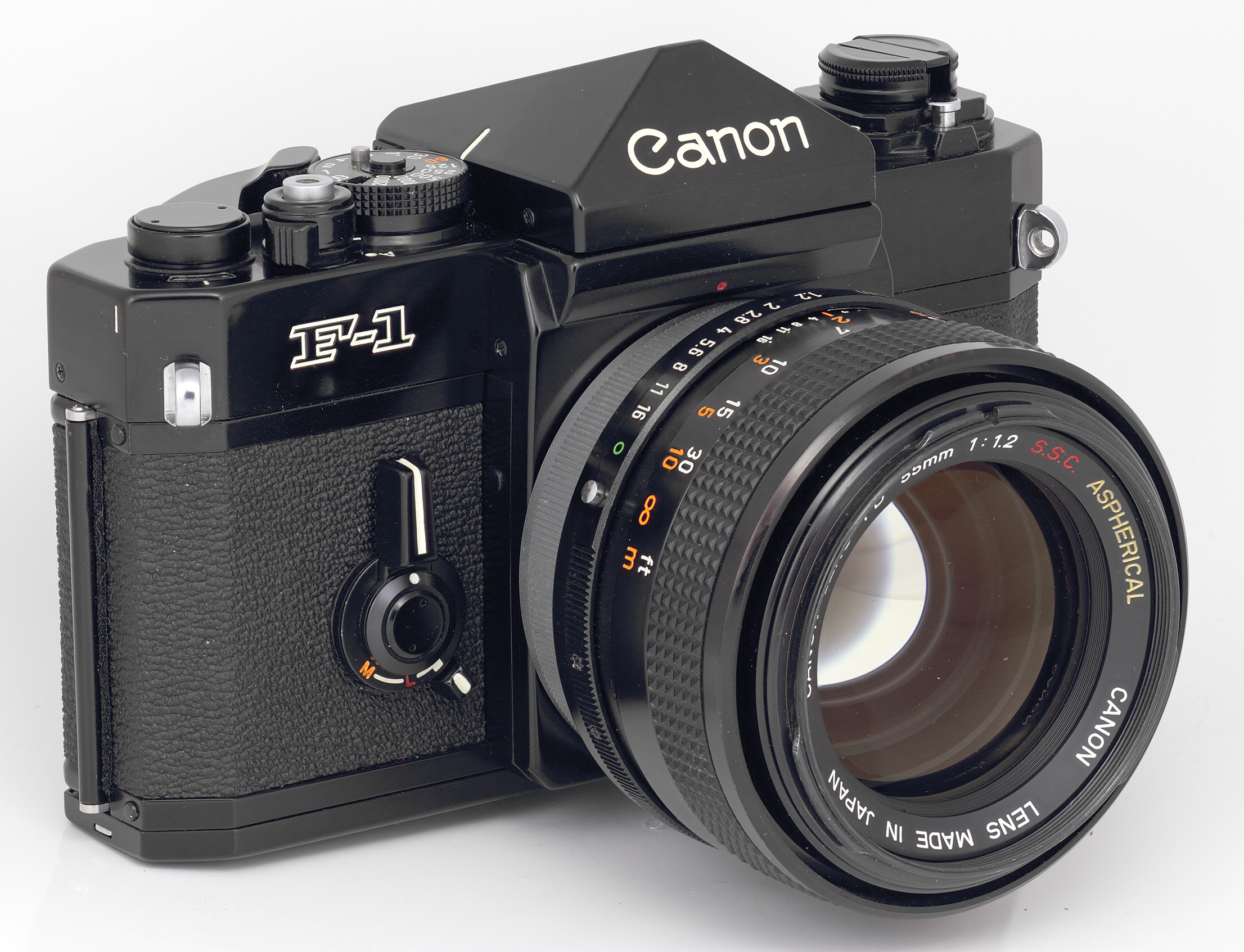

Overview
- Maker: Canon Camera K. K.
- Type: 35 mm SLR
- Released: 1971 Canon F-1; 1976 Canon F-1n
- Production: 1971-1981

Lens
- Lens mount: Canon FD lens mount

Sensor/medium
- Film format: 35mm
- Film size: 36 mm × 24 mm

Focusing
- Focus: Manual

Exposure/metering
- Exposure: Manual

Shutter
- Shutter: Four-axis, horizontal-travel focal-plane shutter with metal curtains.
- Shutter speed range: 1s - 1/2000s

General
- Dimensions: 147×99×43 mm (5.8×3.9×1.7 in)
- Weight: 820 g (29 oz)
- Made in: Japan

Chronology
- Successor: Canon New F-1

The Canon F-1 is a professional 35 mm single-lens reflex camera manufactured by Canon of Japan, unveiled in September 1970 at Photokina and commercially released in March 1971, designed to compete with the Nikon F and F2.

Featuring a titanium foil shutter, FD mount, and modular system, it became a benchmark for professional photographers and was Canon's first professional SLR. It was sold from March 1971 until the end of 1981, at which point it had been superseded by the New F-1 launched earlier that year. The Canon FD lens mount was introduced along with the F-1, but the previous Canon FL-mount lenses and older R- series lenses were also compatible with the camera with some limitations. The Canon F-1 was marketed as a competitor to the Nikon F and Nikon F2 single lens reflex cameras by Nikon.

The F-1 was Canon's first successful professional-grade SLR system, supporting a huge variety of accessories and interchangeable parts so it could be adapted for different uses and preferences. Their earlier professional Canonflex of 1959 had failed due to a premature introduction—before professional accessories were ready.

In 1972 Canon launched a Highspeed model with a fixed pellicle mirror that allowed the user to see the subject at all times. Equipped with a motor drive, the camera was able to shoot up to nine frames per second—the highest speed of any motor driven camera at the time.

== Lenses ==
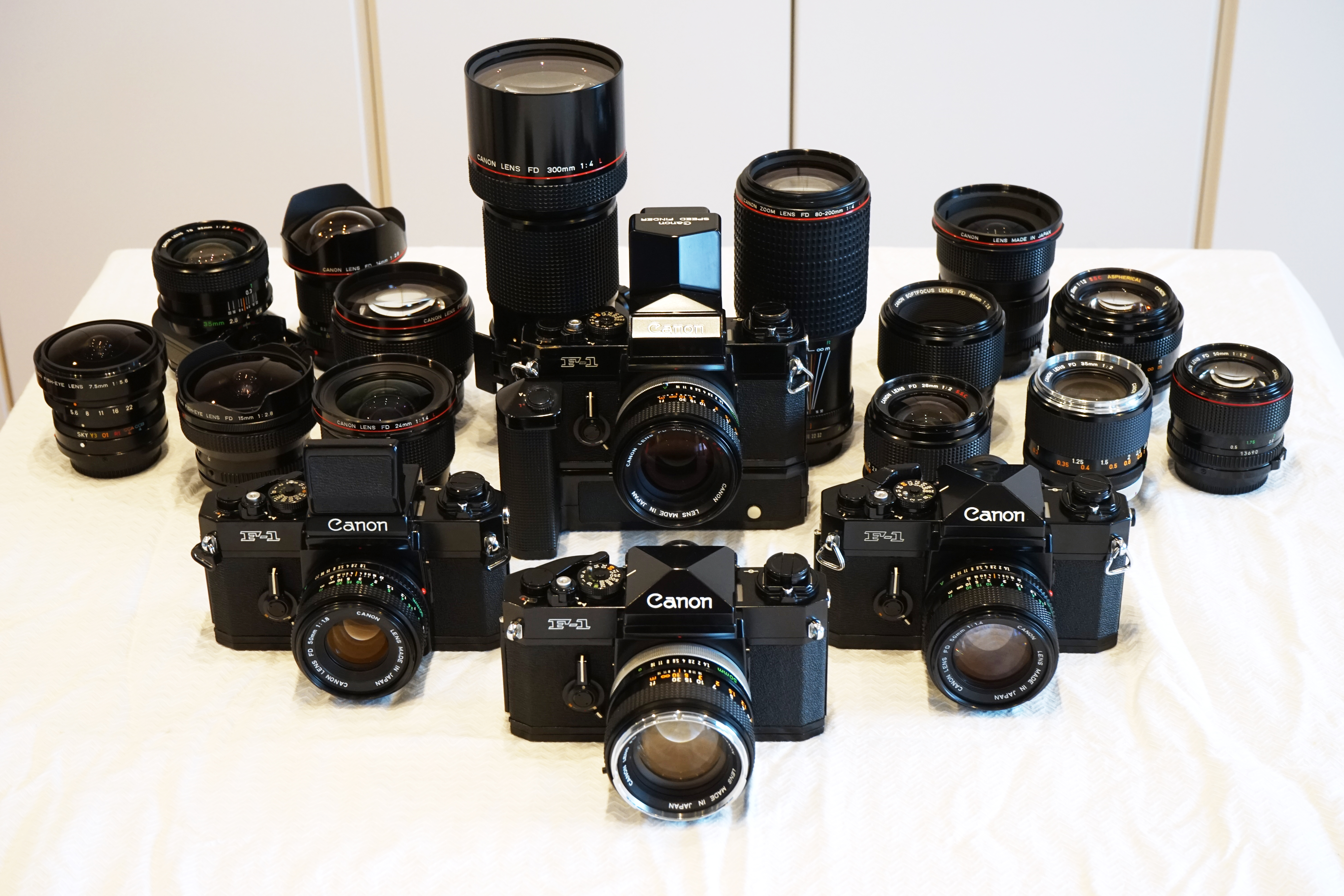
Four Canon F-1 cameras displayed alongside an assortment of FD mount lenses

The Canon F-1 uses the Canon FD lens mount, which was introduced alongside the camera. Between 1970 and 1979, a total of 68 different FD mount lens models were produced, ranging from 7.5mm to 800mm in focal length.

Most earlier FL and R series lenses are compatible with the F-1, though they must be used in stop-down metering mode. One exception is the FLP 38 mm F2.8, which was designed for the Canon Pellix. This lens' rear element extends further into the camera body than other FL-mount lenses, and would obstruct the moving mirror of the Canon F-1.

Canon introduced a number of innovations in the FD lens line, including the first use of an aspherical lens element in a 35mm camera system with the release of the FD 55mm f/1.2 AL in (launched alongside the F-1 in March 1971). Canon's super telephoto FD lenses were also the first to use white-colored housings, which were designed to keep the thermally sensitive fluorite lens elements from expanding or cracking. Canon continues to use white housings for its L-series lenses today, though the modern versions are made with ultra-low dispersion (UD) glass rather than fluorite.

== Accessories ==
The Canon F-1 has one of the largest set of accessories of any 35mm SLR ever produced. The viewfinder is removable (interchangeable with four other viewfinders); The focusing screen can be changed out with 4 (later 9) types; the mirror can be locked up to allow deep seated lenses or for high magnification work, the back is interchangeable with a data and bulk film back (250 exposures), The bottom plate is removable and there are 4 Motor Drives and / or Power Winders that can be used (one was a special order 9 frames per second high speed motor drive); three different flash couplers allowed a wide variety of flashes; the eyepiece can take threaded diopter adjustment lenses, magnifiers or angle finders; and the lens collection numbers over 50 FD (and a few special purpose) lenses from 7.5 mm fisheye to 1200 mm super telephoto, and includes the world's fastest 300 mm at the time (the 300 mm F2.8L) and the world's fastest 400 mm lens (the New FD 400 mm F2.8L) both of which incorporate special fluorite and ultra low dispersion glass elements for superb optical quality at the widest lens opening.

=== Viewfinders ===
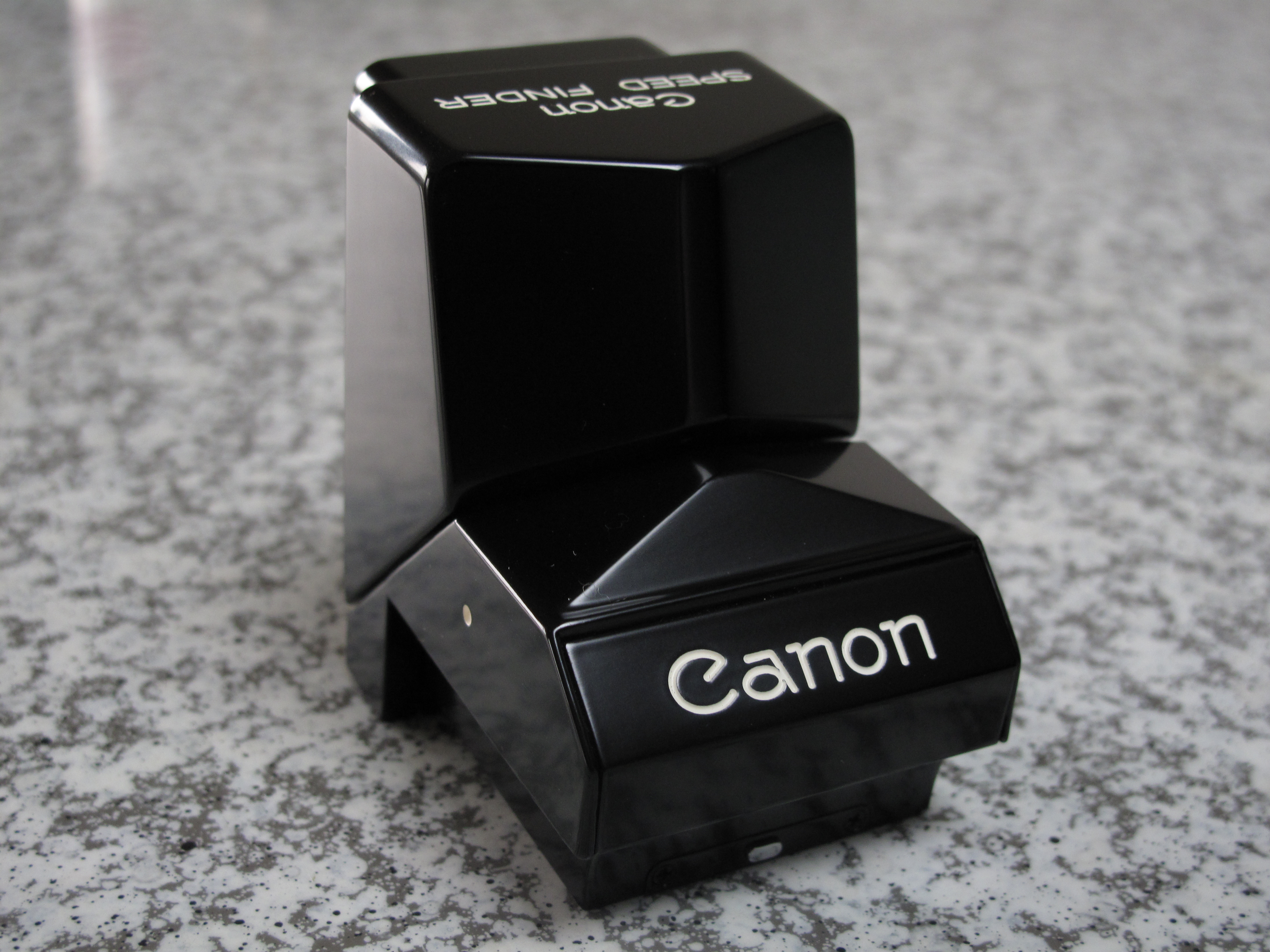
Speed Finder (front)

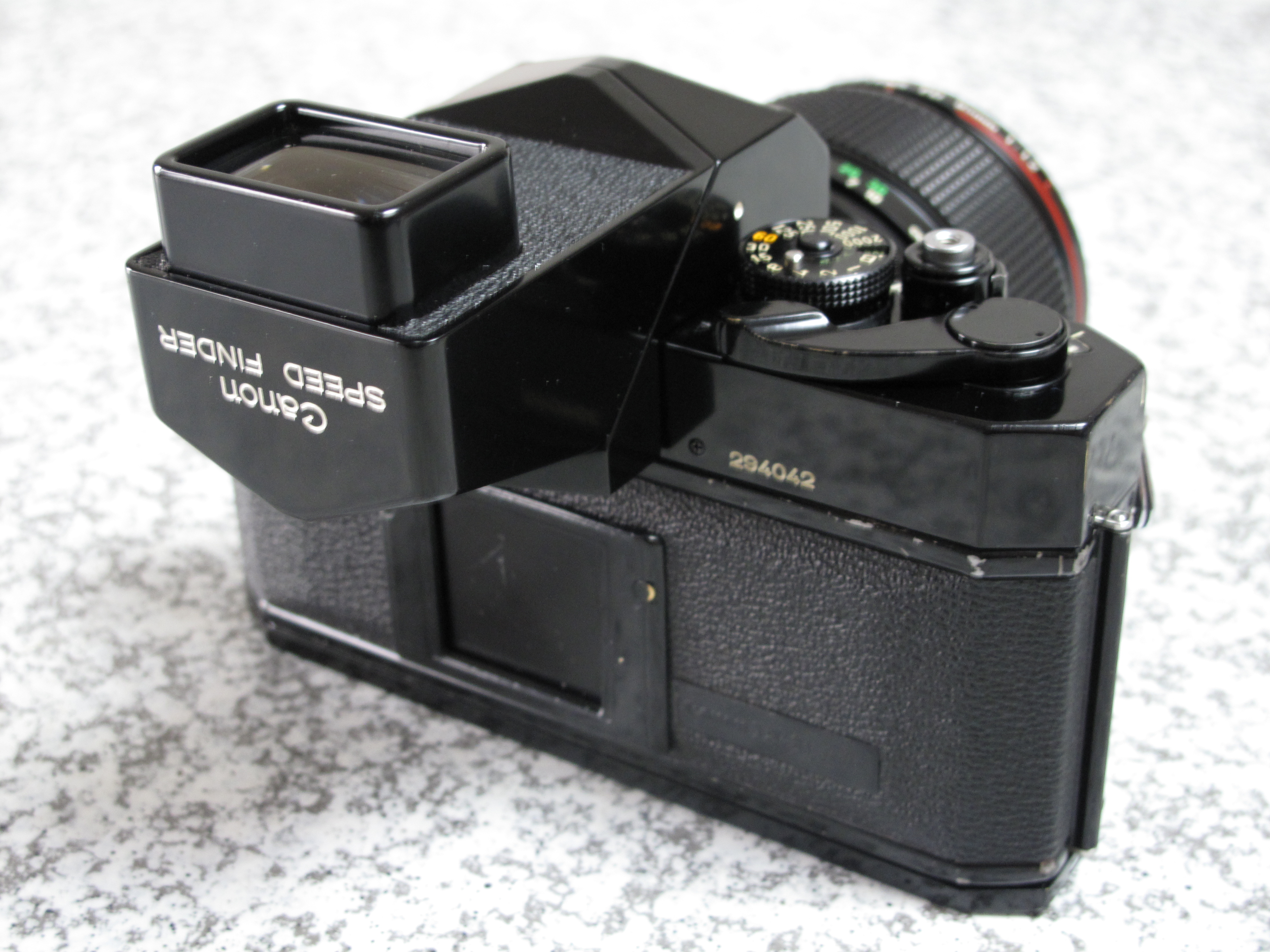
F-1 with Speed Finder (rear, rotated)

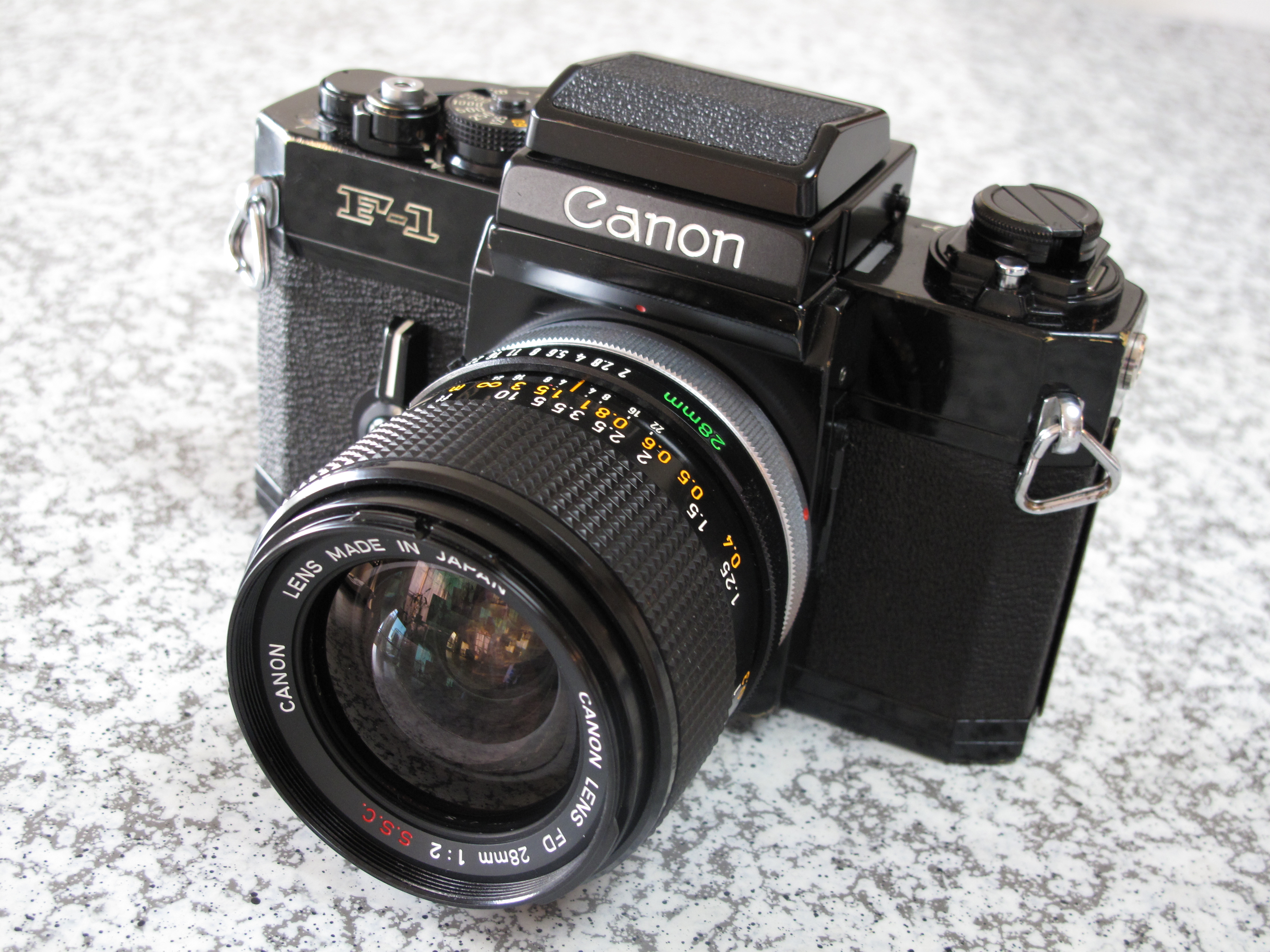
F-1 with Waist-Level Finder (closed)

Like most professional 35 mm cameras of the 1970s, the F-1 had interchangeable viewfinders. To remove the viewfinder, one depressed the two small buttons at the rear sides of the finder, and slid the finder toward the back of the camera (or depress one button on the bottom of the Speed Finder).

The camera shipped with a standard pentaprism finder, called an "eye-level finder" by Canon.

Other finders available included a waist-level finder, Speed Finder, Booster T finder, and Servo EE finder.

The waist-level finder was patterned after the design of waist-level finders common to medium format SLR and TLR cameras. It had a pop-up hood to shield the focusing screen from stray light, as well as a magnifier to help with critical focusing. The waist-level finder did not allow the metering information to be seen.

The Speed Finder had a rotation feature. This had an arrangement of prisms such that it could be swivelled between eye-level and waist-level positions. It also allowed the entire finder image to be viewed from 60 millimeters away and was suggested for use when wearing goggles or anything else that could prevent the user from placing the eyepiece right up to their eye. It allowed full metering.

The Booster T Finder and Servo EE Finder were both essentially variations on the standard eye-level finder. The Booster T Finder contained two sensitive CdS metering cells, powered by a single 6 V #544 (4SR44) silver-oxide button cell battery. It has a metering range from EV –3.5 to +10 with a film speed range of ASA 25–12800. When outside the metering range of the Booster T, the in-body meter is used instead. Just like the metering range was shifted towards the dark side, this finder also shifts the shutter speeds the camera provided towards the long end. Instead of the normal range of shutter speeds (1 – 1/2000 s), the Booster T Finder provided stepped shutter speeds of 60 – 1/60 s. It completely covers the shutter speed selector and shutter release on the body. The finder also had a shutter release button, which went through the finder down to the normal release. The shutter speed dial on the finder locked on to the camera's normal shutter dial and drove it through a coupling pin for the standard range of 1 – 1/60 s. When the Booster's shutter speed dial was turned further, towards longer times, the camera's dial stopped at the B(ulb) setting, and the finder kept the shutter release on the body pressed for the duration of the exposure. The mechanics of this connection also resulted in the oddity that there was no 2 s setting, but 4, 3 and 1 seconds.

The Servo EE Finder added shutter priority automatic exposure to the F-1. Like the Booster T, the Servo EE contains two CdS metering cells; its metering range is from EV +2.5 to +18. A servo mechanism in the finder drove the aperture lever on the lens via the "EE Coupler" arm, stopping the lens down to the correct value. This finder used the same coupling pin on the shutter speed dial as the Booster T Finder did, to sync the finder's shutter speed setting with the camera. It required a cord connected battery magazine (8 AAs) or the Motor Drive MF and a special power cord.

=== Motor drives ===
The originally available Motor Drive was named the "Motor Drive Unit", which attached to the bottom of the camera with a long, cylindrical extension which housed the winding motor and gearbox. It was commonly referred to as the Motor Drive MD – because all of the accessories had MD in their suffix, but that was not the official designation. The Motor Drive Unit originally required a corded Battery Case which either used the Battery Magazine 15V battery pack (which took 10 AA batteries) or the NiCd 500 FZ and plugged into the bottom of the cylindrical extension, making it unwieldy for field or sports action use. The same Battery Case could be used with the Battery Magazine 12V (8 AAs) for the Servo EE or Booster T Finders. An alternative battery pack ("Battery Case D") was released by 1973 which directly connected to a bracket around the tripod socket of the unit. The Motor Drive Unit also contained a built-in intervalometer for delays up to 1 frame per minute. The maximum speed was 3 frames per second.

In 1972 Canon made a special modification of the F-1 called the "High Speed Motor Drive Camera". The moving mirror was replaced by a fixed pellicle (semi transparent) mirror and the motor drive was permanently attached; the camera's wind lever was removed, making it impossible to use without the motor drive. It used a corded battery case which took 20 AA batteries The slowest shutter speed was limited to 1/60 sec. Maximum speed was 9 frames per second, the fastest available at the time. Its use at the 1972 Olympics in Japan produced fantastic sequential shots that were previously impossible to achieve.

In 1973, Canon introduced the Motor Drive MF, which was divided into two parts: a drive unit which attached to the bottom of the body, and a battery grip. The Motor Drive MF had its batteries (10 AAs) in a vertical grip that normally mounted to the front of the camera, where it could be gripped by the photographer's right hand, but could be detached and connected via the coiled "Connecting Cord for Grip MF" for remote operation. It had a maximum rate of 3.5 frame/sec and was much better suited to action / sports photography, especially when paired with the Speed Finder or Servo EE finder. A special cord ("Connecting Cord MF") allowed the Servo EE finder to draw its power from the Motor Drive MF – thus making a much more compact setup than the original Motor Drive unit. The Motor Drive MF did not have a built in intervalometer, but the Interval Timer L (and later the Interval Timer TM-1 (Quartz) could be plugged into the remote control socket as could remote switches and a wireless control unit, the Wireless Controller LC-1. These all allowed either remote and / or unattended use of the camera.

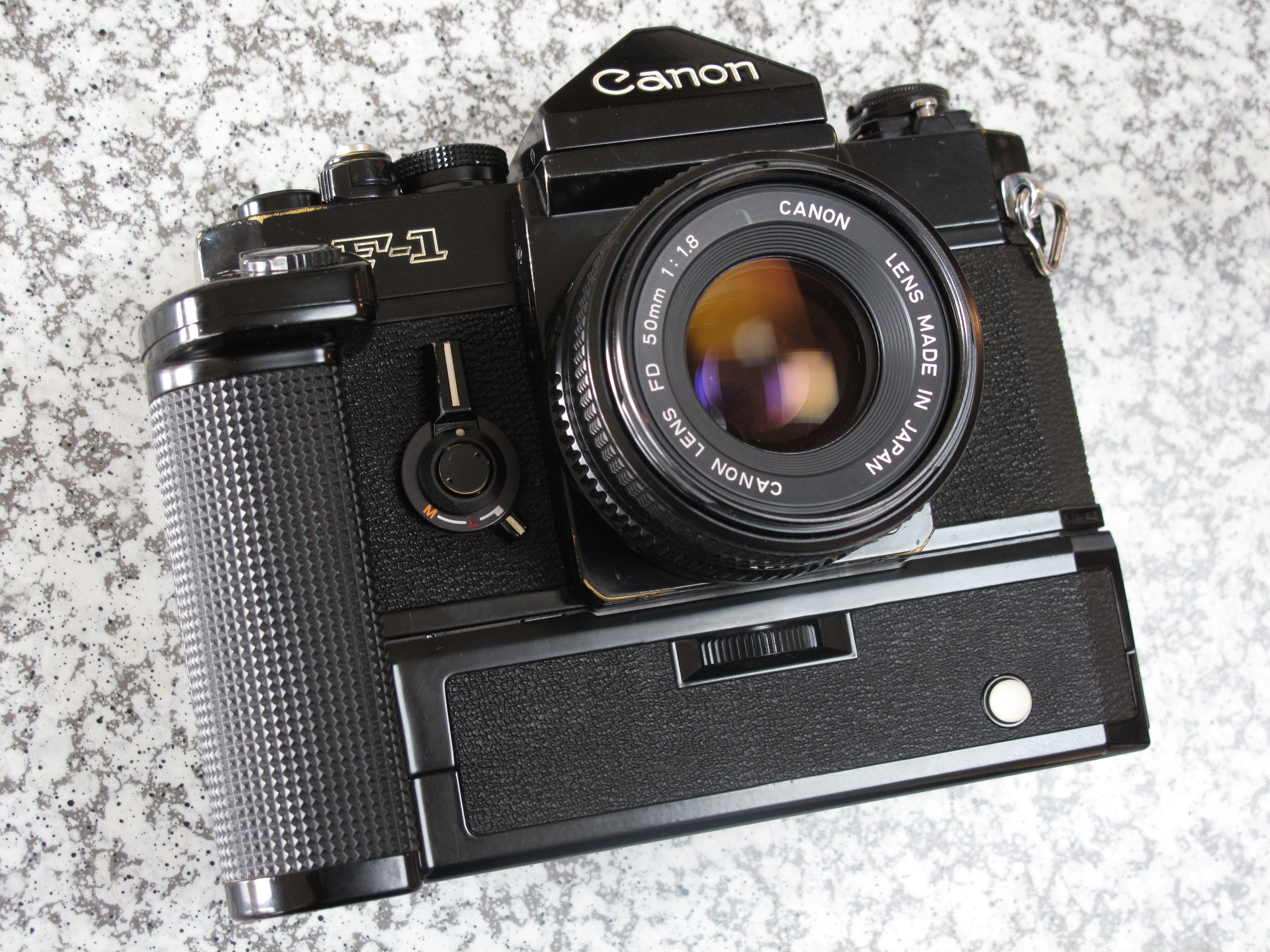
F-1 with Power Winder F

Later, Canon introduced the Power Winder F, a 2 frame/ sec power winder with a grip for ease of use. It used 4 AA batteries in the same battery magazine that the Canon A-series Power Winder A used. The Power winder F could use most of the remote switches that also fit the Motor Drive MF. The only two accessories that it could not use were the Interval Timer L and the Remote Switch 60-MF. While not as fast, the Power Winder F was smaller and lighter than the Motor Drive MF.

Unlike many other professional-level cameras of the early 1970s, the F-1 required no modification or special custom fitting to attach the motor drives, one simply removed the bottom plate and screwed the motor drive in place.

=== Backs ===
The F-1's back was removable. Two data backs or the Film Chamber 250, a bulk film back that could hold 250 exposures, could be attached.

The Data Back set includes a Data Controller, which allows up to twelve digits (0–9) to be imprinted on the film, six digits each on the left and right sides, using a seven-segment display for each digit. The Data Controller resembles a desktop calculator with a vacuum fluorescent display and is powered by four AA batteries. The Data Back F is a self-contained unit with three analog dials to select numbers, certain letters, or Roman numerals.

The Film Chamber 250 could be used alone or with the Motor Drive Unit or Motor Drive MF; the MF's grip had to be removed and coupled via a dedicated cord.

=== Eyepiece ===
The F-1s eyepiece was threaded and could take a metal (later soft rubber covered) ring, an eyecup or several different diopter adjustment lenses. The Magnifier R and Angle Finders A2 and B could also be attached to allow critical focusing and / or waist-level use (if one did not want to fit either the Speed Finder or Waist Level Finder).

=== Focusing screens ===
Canon offered nine different focusing screens for the F-1, with the default being the Type A. Initially, four were available (Types A – D).

Canon focusing screens for F-1
Type	Image	Field	Center focusing aid	Notes
A		Ground matte Fresnel	Microprism spot	Suitable for general photography.
B		Ground matte Fresnel	Split-image rangefinder spot (horizontal)	Suitable for general photography.
C		Ground matte Fresnel	Fine-ground matte spot	Suitable for general photography.
D		Ground matte Fresnel	Fine-ground matte spot	Includes etched grid of vertical and horizontal lines, otherwise similar to Type C.
E		Ground matte Fresnel	Split-image rangefinder spot (horizontal) with microprism collar	Suitable for general photography. Combines Types A and B.
F		Ground matte Fresnel	Microprism spot	Suitable for general photography with fast lenses (maximum aperture ≤ f/2.8), otherwise similar to Type A.
G		Ground matte Fresnel	Microprism spot	Suitable for general photography with slow lenses (maximum aperture ≥ f/3.5), otherwise similar to Type A.
H		Ground matte Fresnel	Fine-ground matte spot	Includes ruled horizontal and vertical scales for scientific or close-up work, but can be used for general photography.
I		Ground matte Fresnel	Double cross-hair reticle	Intended for high-magnification work; uses parallax focusing.

The focusing screen condenser incorporates a beam-splitting mirror which directs some of the incident light to the in-body CdS photoresistor light meter. This caused a perceptible darkening of the metering area, which shows up as a rectangular area in the center of the frame.

=== Flash accessories ===
With a removable viewfinder, the F-1's flash coupler originally attached atop the rewind crank. Initially, there were two flash couplers, D and L. The D model was a simple x-synch coupler that allowed any non-dedicated manual or auto flash to be used. The Flash Coupler L contained two batteries (now hard to find, one being originally a 1.35v mercuric oxide and the other being the uncommon PX-1 size), one which powered a light to light up the metering window visible in the viewfinder, and the other to work with the original Canon Auto tuning system (CATS). The CATS used a special auto flash, the SpeedLite 133D and Flash auto Rings A, B, A2 and B2 and Canon 50 mm and 35 mm Lenses which signalled through the cords the distance of the subject and the charge level of the flash to allow match needle flash photography.

Canon announced and produced manuals for a high power handle mounted ("potato masher") flash designated SpeedLight 500A. This was also to use the CATS equipment It appears in some Canon publications, and there are user instructions for it, however most people have never actually seen a SpeedLight 500A.

For low ambient light photography without flash, Canon provided the Finder Illuminator F which slid over the same flash contacts at the flash couplers. It contained a small battery powered light to light up the metering window.

Later, Canon introduced the Flash Coupler F, which fastened over the Eye Level Finder, making the camera look like more like one with a fixed viewfinder and hot shoe. This flash coupler, obviously could not be used with any other viewfinder, and did not have the electronics that the L model had, but it was more compact and the newer A-series flashes which had auto flash capabilities had now superseded the old SpeedLite 133D.

The CATS flash equipment was for the later electronic Canon F1 New (1981) and it allowed aperture settings from the camera to be communicated to the flash unit. It was also possible for the flash unit to select an appropriate camera aperture based on its own photo cell exposure reading, provided that the motor drive was also present. The motor drive is necessary for the camera to function in shutter priority. TTL Flash was introduced on the Nikon F3 (1981) which was a direct competitor of the F1 New. For many this was considered as a considerable advantage although the ergonomics of the Nikon F3 with its liquid crystal display lacked the clarity of the Canon F1.

=== Macro, micro and close-up photography ===
A comprehensive set of close-up, macro and microphoto accessories was available for the F-1, including three bellows units, reversing rings and couplers, macro and micro photo hoods and couplers, copy stands, manual and automatic extension tubes and 3 different focal length macro lenses.

== Revisions ==
In 1976, the camera was revised slightly. This revised version is sometimes called the F-1n (not to be confused with the 1981 New F-1). All told 13 improvements were made. These changes were:

1. Change the standard focusing screen from the A style (microprism only) to E style (split image with microprism ring).
2. Widen the film advance lever offset from 15 degrees to 30 degrees.
3. Decrease the winding stroke from 180 degrees to 139 degrees.
4. Increase the maximum ASA from 2000 to 3200.
5. Added a plastic tip to the advance lever.
6. Changed the mirror to transmit more blue light, thus making the image brighter.
7. Added a detent to the rewind crank to allow it to stay put when pulled out.
8. Added the capability to take a screw-in type PC sync socket.
9. Spring load the battery check position of the power switch.
10. Increase the size of the shutter release cup.
11. Added a soft rubber ring around the eyepiece.
12. Added a film reminder holder to the camera back.
13. Simplify multiple exposure procedure.

The number of focusing screens was also expanded from four to nine.

In 1980 Canon introduced "Laser Matte" focusing screens identified by an "L" in a circle on the screen's label. These Laser Matte screens were noticeably brighter than the earlier screens, and they were continued with the New F-1.

== Special editions ==
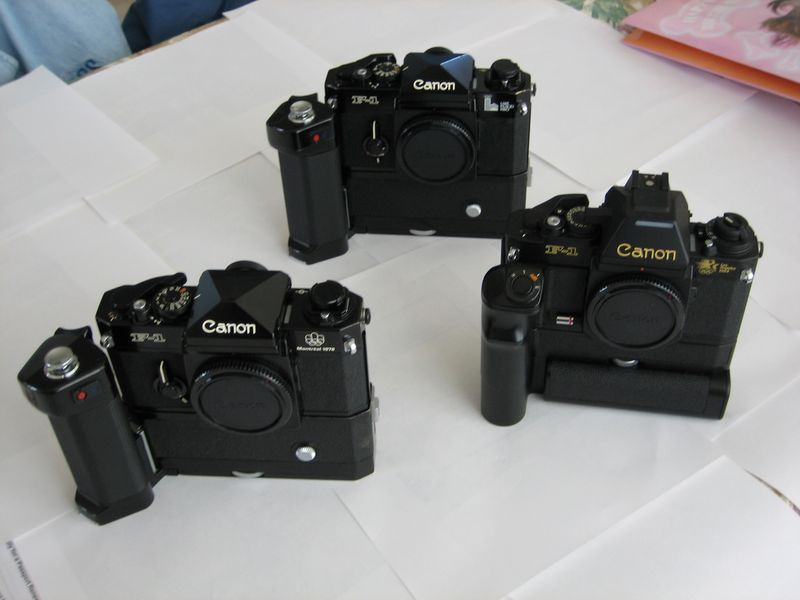
Three special Olympic edition Canon cameras; from left to right: Canon F-1 Montreal (1976); Canon F-1n Lake Placid (1980); Canon New F-1 Los Angeles (1984)

A special commemorative model of the F-1 was offered for the 1976 Montreal Olympics. It was identical to the regular F-1 but for the Olympic emblem on the front upper left of the body. Canon also manufactured and sold commemorative 55 mm and (much harder to find) 58 mm lens caps with the 1976 Montreal Olympics for their normal lenses in production at the time.

For the 1980 Winter Olympics in Lake Placid, a Special version of the F-1 with the engraved Lake Placid Olympic logo was offered. Special Lake Placid 52 mm lens caps were also made.

In 1978 a military model called "ODF-1" (olive drab) with an all-over olive green finishing was presented. (Note, this was not for military use but rather a special addition made for the civilian market. It is unknown how many were made, figures are estimated to be around 3,000.)

Canon, being the official sponsor of the World Cup, made 1978 55 mm lens caps and 1982 52 mm lens caps commemorating the 1978 and 1982 World Cup events.

== In popular culture ==
The Museum of Contemporary Art in Gothenburg in Sweden showed a giant working replica of the Canon F1 made by the artist Sonja Nilsson in 2001.

	1971	1972	1973	1974	1975	1976	1977	1978	1979	1980	1981	1982	1983	1984	1985	1986	1987	1988	1989	1990	1991	1992	1993
Professional																T90							
Professional		F-1 High Speed Motor Drive Camera												New F-1 High Speed Motor Drive Camera									
Professional	F-1						F-1N / F-1 (Later Model)					New F-1											
Amateur				EF					A-1														
Amateur															T70								
Amateur	FTb			FTb-N			AE-1					AE-1 Program											
Amateur					TLb					AV-1			AL-1			T80							
Amateur					TX		AT-1							T50							T60		
