= Canon FP =

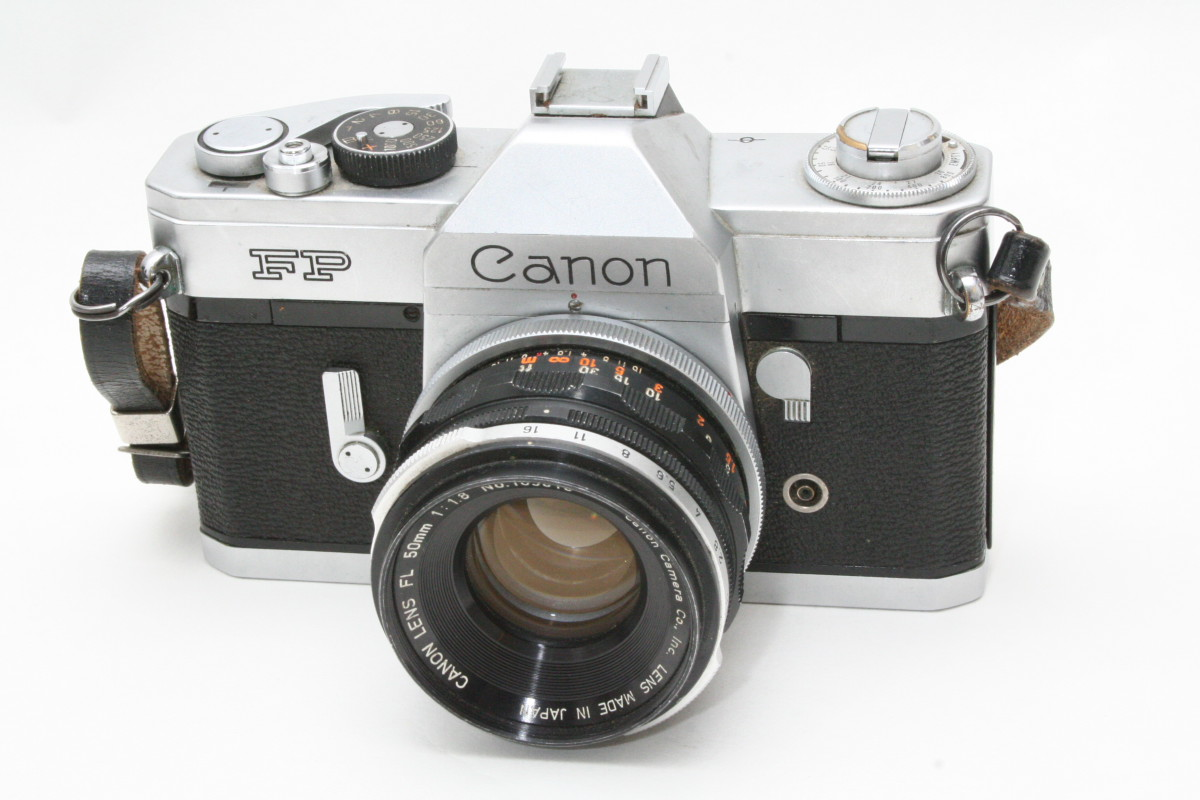

Overview
- Maker: Canon Inc.
- Type: 35mm SLR

Lens
- Lens mount: Canon FL lens mount

Focusing
- Focus: Manual

Exposure/metering
- Exposure: Manual, no onboard meter

Flash
- Flash: PC Connector only

General
- Dimensions: 141 × 90 × 83 mm, 940 g (with 50mm f/1.8)

The Canon FP is a 35 mm SLR introduced by Canon Inc. of Japan in October 1964, using the new Canon FL lens mount. The FP and FX were virtually the same camera, but the lower priced FP built in metering. At the time, many photographers preferred using a handheld meter, and others preferred the lower pricing. However, the FP was not popular making it more rare and desirable for collectors. Canon sold an external light meter with the same specifications as the built-in meter on the FX. The shutter is a horizontally traveling focal plane shutter supporting speeds between 1/1000 and 1 second in full stop increments, selected by a dial on the top plate on the photographer's right. The X-sync speed for flash is 1/55 sec.; flash support was through a PC socket on the front of the body.

The viewfinder uses a glass pentaprism and gives coverage of 90% of the frame vertically and 93% horizontally, with a 0.9× magnification (with a 50 mm standard lens).

The FP was available with either silver or black metal parts.

	1964		1965	1966	1967	1968	1969	1970
Cameras		FX	Pellix	Pellix QL				
Cameras			FP	FT QL		TL		
