= Canon FX =

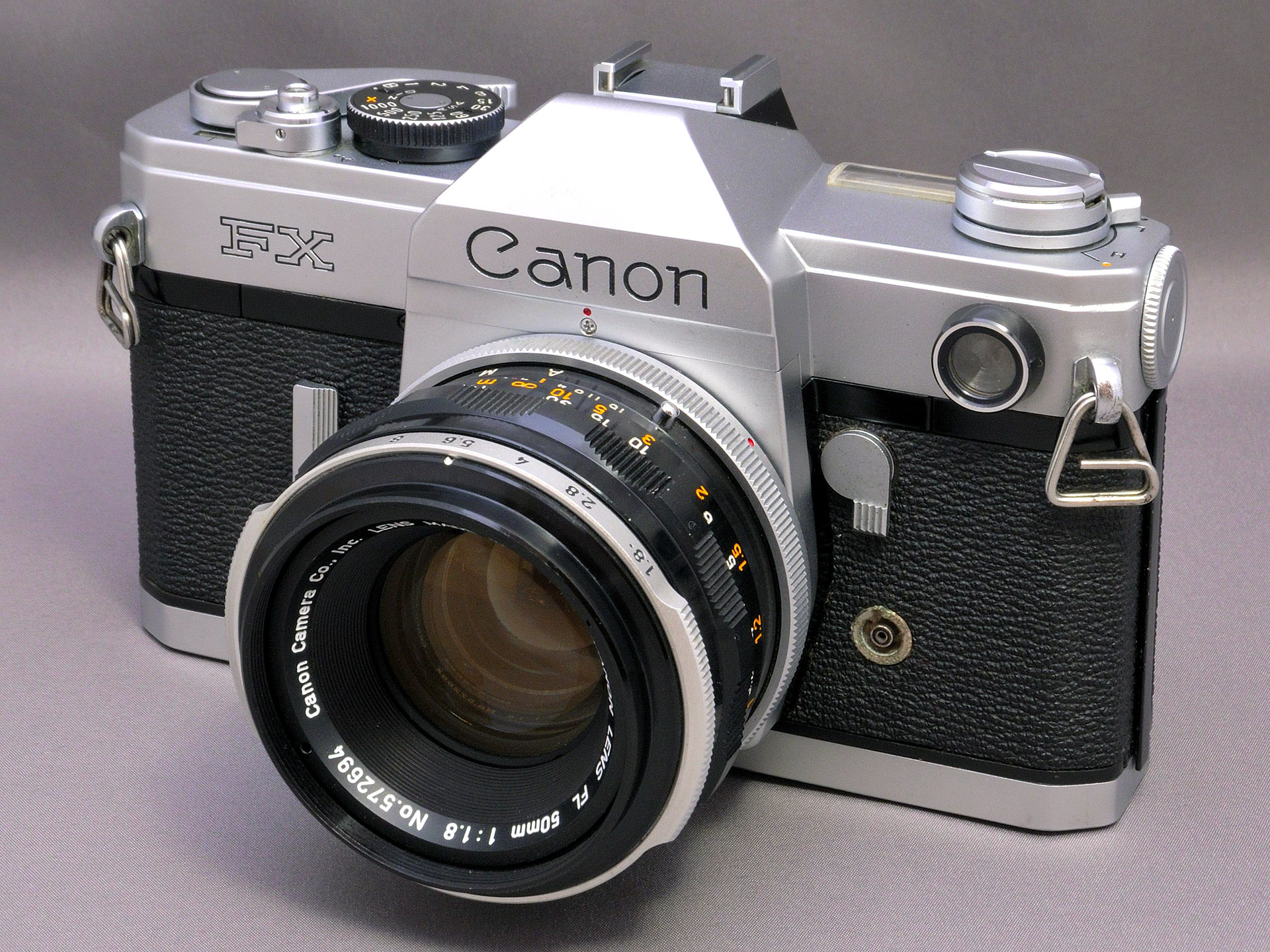

Overview
- Maker: Canon Inc.
- Type: 35mm SLR

Lens
- Lens mount: Canon FL lens mount

Focusing
- Focus: Manual

Exposure/metering
- Exposure: Cadmium sulfide photocell (2 ranges)

Flash
- Flash: PC socket only

General
- Dimensions: 141.5 × 91 × 86 mm, 900 g (with 50mm f/1.8)

The Canon FX is a 35 mm SLR manufactured by Canon Inc. of Japan and introduced in April 1964. It introduced the Canon FL lens mount, the successor to the Canon R.

The camera has a built-in lightmeter using a CdS photocell mounted on the photographer's left-hand side; unlike later cameras, it does not meter through the taking lens. A lever switched between low sensitivity for bright subjects (EV 9–18) and high sensitivity for dark subjects (EV 1-10) (at ISO 100). Film speeds supported are ISO 10 through 800.

The shutter is a horizontally-traveling focal plane shutter supporting speeds between 1/1000 and 1 second in full stop increments, selected by a dial on the top plate on the photographer's right. The X-sync speed for flash is 1/55 sec.; flash support was through a PC socket on the front of the body.

The viewfinder uses a glass pentaprism and gives coverage of 90% of the frame vertically and 93% horizontally, with a 0.9× magnification (with a 50 mm standard lens).

The FX was available with either silver or black metal parts. Black versions are exceedingly rare, there were only two known all-black models until November 2014 when a third was found. Two are owned by a private collector in Pennsylvania, USA and another one by a private collector in Koromilia, Kilkis, Greece.

	1964		1965	1966	1967	1968	1969	1970
Cameras		FX	Pellix	Pellix QL				
Cameras			FP	FT QL		TL		
