= Canon FL lens mount =

Lens mount

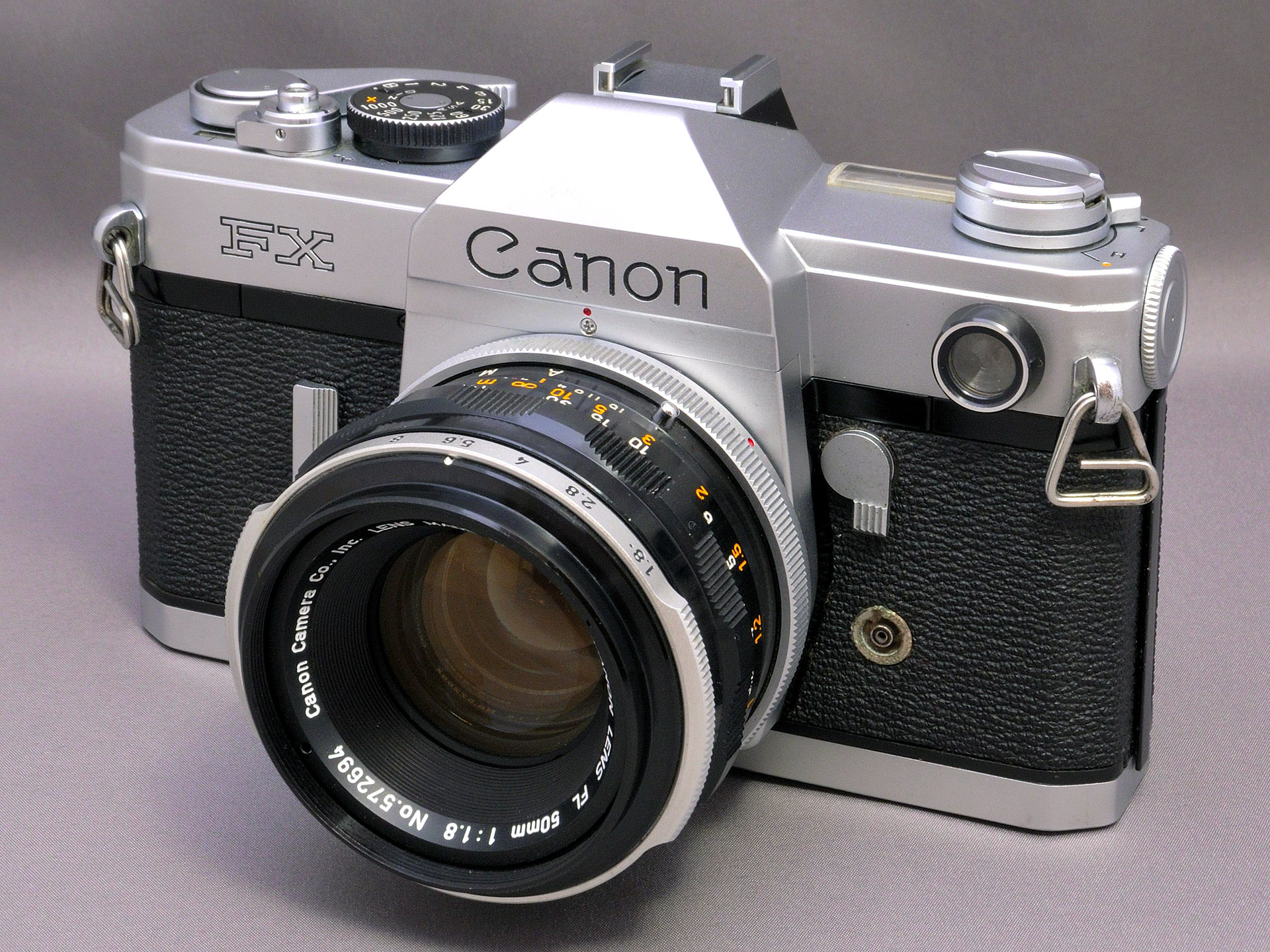
Canon FX with FL 50mm f/1.8

Canon FL refers to a lens mount standard for 35mm single-lens reflex cameras from Canon. It was introduced in April 1964 with the Canon FX camera, replacing the previous Canon R lens mount. The FL mount was in turn replaced in 1971 by the Canon FD lens mount. FL lenses can also be used on FD-mount cameras.

Many mirrorless interchangeable-lens cameras are able to use Canon FL lenses via an adapter.

== FL cameras ==
- Canon FX (1964)
- Canon FP (1964)
- Canon Pellix (1965)
- Canon FT QL (1966)
- Canon Pellix QL (1966)
- Canon TL (1968)

== FL lenses ==
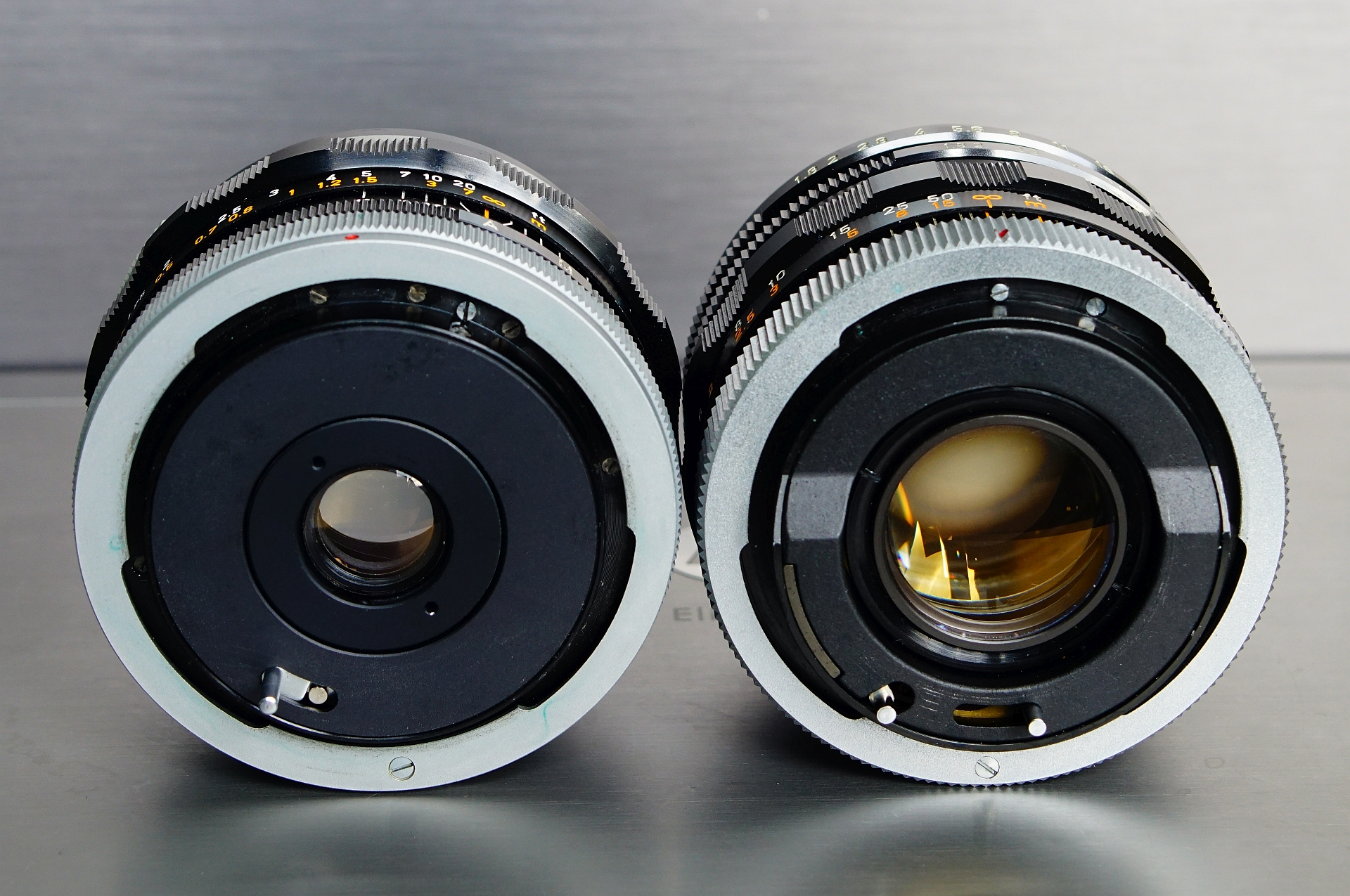
Differences in aperture coupling mechanisms for Canon FL (28mm lens, left) and R mount (50mm lens, right)

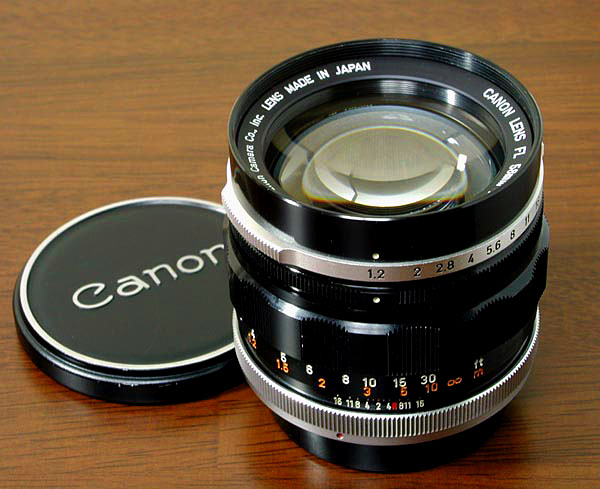
FL 58mm f/1.2

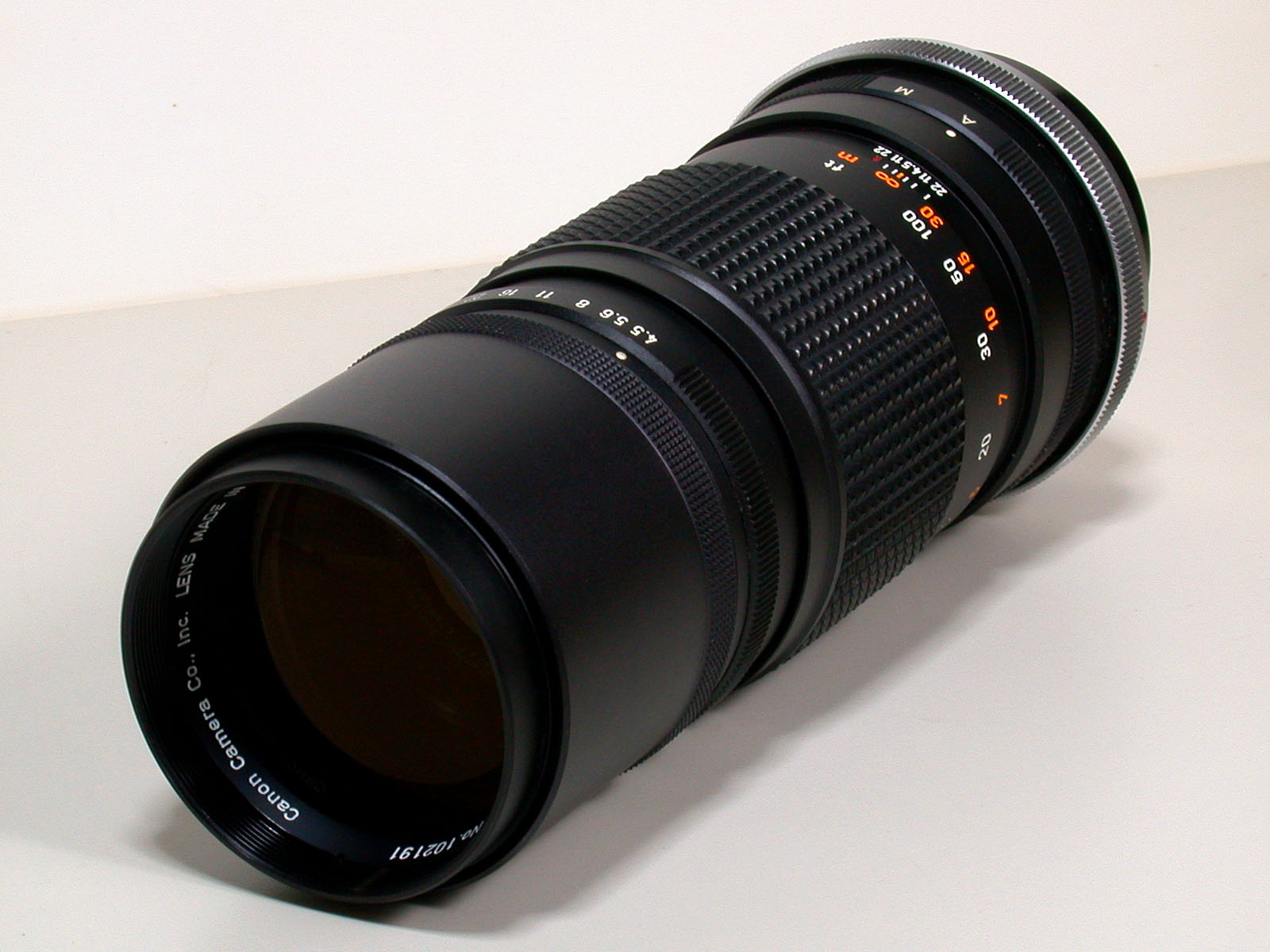
FL 200mm f/4.5

Canon FL lenses
Focal length (mm)	Name	Aperture	Year	Construc. (ele/grp)	Min. focus (mag.)	Filter (mm)	Dia. × Len.	Wgt.	Notes
Wide angle lenses
19	FL 19mm f/3.5	f/3.5–16	Aug 1964	9/7	0.5 m (1.6 ft) (0.044×)	58	65×18 mm (2.6×0.7 in)	150 g (5.3 oz)	(Note: The FL 19mm F3.5 (not the 19mm F3.5 R) was a true wide angle (short focus) lens, similar in construction to the Zeiss Biogon. Its rear projected far into the mirror box on an SLR, and because of this, it could only be used on a camera with mirror lock-up (FP, FX, FT, F-1 (old), FTb, EF). It could not be used on either Pellix model.)
19	FL 19mm f/3.5R	f/3.5–16	Nov 1965	11/9	0.5 m (1.6 ft) (0.048×)	Ser. IX	82×68 mm (3.2×2.7 in)	500 g (18 oz)	
28	FL 28mm f/3.5	f/3.5–16	Dec 1966	7/7	0.4 m (1.3 ft) (0.09×)	58	65×40 mm (2.6×1.6 in)	240 g (8.5 oz)	
35	FL 35mm f/2.5	f/2.5–16	Mar 1964	7/5	0.4 m (1.3 ft) (0.115×)	58	63×55 mm (2.5×2.2 in)	352 g (12.4 oz)	
35	FL 35mm f/3.5	f/3.5–16	May 1968	6/6	0.4 m (1.3 ft) (0.106×)	48	62×43 mm (2.4×1.7 in)	270 g (9.5 oz)	
38	FLP 38mm f/2.8	f/2.8–16	May 1965	4/3	0.8 m (2.6 ft) (0.054×)	48	66×21 mm (2.6×0.8 in)	210 g (7.4 oz)	(Note: The FL P 38mm F2.8 also projected into the mirror box. It was specially designed for the Pellix and could not be used on any other camera because the moving mirror would hit the rear of the lens. This lens had a longer lens mount index (the pin on the back or the lens at the top), that only fit the deeper cutout at the top of the Pellix's lens mount, thus making it impossible to mount this lens on any other camera.)
Normal lenses (Note: Canon released 3 'levels' of standard lenses (exc. macro). The f/1.8 lenses were small and lightweight, f/1.4 were mid-range, and the f/1.2 were professional level (top of their line).)
50	FL 50mm f/1.4	f/1.4–16	Apr 1965	6/4	0.6 m (2.0 ft) (0.103×)	58	65×43 mm (2.6×1.7 in)	280 g (9.9 oz)	
50	FL 50mm f/1.4 I	f/1.4–16	Sep 1966	6/5	0.6 m (2.0 ft) (0.103×)	58	64×43 mm (2.5×1.7 in)	?	
50	FL 50mm f/1.4 II	f/1.4–16	May 1968	7/6	0.6 m (2.0 ft) (0.101×)	58	65×51 mm (2.6×2.0 in)	340 g (12 oz)	
50	FL 50mm f/1.8 I	f/1.8–16	Mar 1964	6/4	0.6 m (2.0 ft) (0.104×)	48	61×40 mm (2.4×1.6 in)	228 g (8.0 oz)	
50	FL 50mm f/1.8 II	f/1.8–16	Mar 1968	6/4	0.6 m (2.0 ft) (0.103×)	48	62×42.5 mm (2.4×1.7 in)	280 g (9.9 oz)	
50	FL 50mm f/3.5 Macro	f/3.5–16	Jun 1965	4/3	0.234 m (0.8 ft) (0.5×)	58	64×56 mm (2.5×2.2 in)	295 g (10.4 oz)	
55	FL 55mm f/1.2	f/1.2–16	Jul 1968	8/7	0.6 m (2.0 ft) (0.109×)	58	67×52.5 mm (2.6×2.1 in)	480 g (17 oz)	
58	FL 58mm f/1.2 I	f/1.2–16	Mar 1964	7/5	0.6 m (2.0 ft) (0.117×)	58	64.5×52.5 mm (2.5×2.1 in)	410 g (14 oz)	
58	FL 58mm f/1.2 II	f/1.2–16	Mar 1966	7/5	0.6 m (2.0 ft) (0.117×)	58	64.5×52.5 mm (2.5×2.1 in)	410 g (14 oz)	
Telephoto lenses
85	FL 85mm f/1.8	f/1.8–16	Sep 1964	5/4	1 m (3.3 ft) (0.101×)	58	64×55 mm (2.5×2.2 in)	445 g (15.7 oz)	
100	FL 100mm f/3.5	f/3.5–22	Oct 1964	5/4	1 m (3.3 ft) (0.101×)	48	63×61 mm (2.5×2.4 in)	278 g (9.8 oz)	
100	FL M 100mm f/4	f/4–22	Sep 1969	5/3	—N/a	48	61×43 mm (2.4×1.7 in)	220 g (7.8 oz)	(Note: The FL M 100mm F4 is a special purpose bellows lens. It could only be used when mounted on a bellows, such as the Bellows FL, because it lacked a focusing ring.)
135	FL 135mm f/2.5	f/2.5–22	May 1965	6/4	1.5 m (4.9 ft) (0.106×)	58	68×102 mm (2.7×4.0 in)	645 g (22.8 oz)	
135	FL 135mm f/3.5	f/3.5–22	May 1965	4/3	1.5 m (4.9 ft) (0.094×)	48	62×83 mm (2.4×3.3 in)	434 g (15.3 oz)	
200	FL 200mm f/3.5 I	f/3.5–22	Mar 1964	7/5	2.5 m (8.2 ft) (0.095×)	58	68×152.5 mm (2.7×6.0 in)	660 g (23 oz)	
200	FL 200mm f/3.5 II	f/3.5–22	May 1966	7/5	2.5 m (8.2 ft) (0.095×)	58	68×152.5 mm (2.7×6.0 in)	680 g (24 oz)	
200	FL 200mm f/4.5	f/4.5–22	Sep 1966	5/4	2.5 m (8.2 ft) (0.094×)	48	63×146 mm (2.5×5.7 in)	555 g (19.6 oz)	
300	FL 300mm f/2.8 S.S.C. Fluorite	f/2.8–32	Feb 1974	6/5	3.5 m (11.5 ft) (0.103×)	—N/a	112×230 mm (4.4×9.1 in)	2,340 g (83 oz)	(Note: Incorporates fluorite element(s) ground from artificial crystal)
300	FL-F 300mm f/5.6	f/5.6–22	May 1969	7/6	3.5 m (11.5 ft) (0.091×)	58	75×168 mm (3.0×6.6 in)	850 g (30 oz)	
400	400mm f/4.5	f/4.5–32	Sep 1971	5/4	4.5 m (14.8 ft) (0.111×)	48	108×338 mm (4.3×13.3 in)	3,890 g (137 oz)	(Note: Two-part telephoto system, consisting of a front unit with the front group, which mounts onto a focusing unit with the rear optical group, automatic diaphragm control mechanism, and focusing rack-and-pinion.)
500	FL-F 500mm f/5.6	f/5.6–22	Jun 1969	6/5	10 m (32.8 ft) (0.059×)	95	106×300 mm (4.2×11.8 in)	2,700 g (95 oz)	
600	600mm f/5.6	f/5.6–32	Sep 1971	6/5	10 m (32.8 ft) (0.07×)	48	128×448 mm (5.0×17.6 in)	5,000 g (180 oz)	
800	800mm f/8	f/8–32	Sep 1971	7/5	18 m (59.1 ft) (0.051×)	48	128×508 mm (5.0×20.0 in)	5,360 g (189 oz)	
1200	1200mm f/11	f/11–64	Jun 1972	7/5	40 m (131.2 ft) (0.032×)	48	128×853 mm (5.0×33.6 in)	6,200 g (220 oz)	
Zoom lenses
55–135	FL 55-135mm f/3.5	f/3.5–22	Mar 1964	13/10	2 m (6.6 ft) (0.08×)	58	69×140 mm (2.7×5.5 in)	780 g (28 oz)	
85–300	FL 85-300mm f/5	f/5–22	Apr 1965	15/9	4 m (13.1 ft) (0.085×)	72	93×279 mm (3.7×11.0 in)	1,850 g (65 oz)	
100–200	FL 100-200mm f/5.6	f/5.6–22	Dec 1966	8/5	2.5 m (8.2 ft) (0.092×)	55	64×173 mm (2.5×6.8 in)	650 g (23 oz)	
Teleconverters
2×	Extender 2×	2×	Feb 1974	5/5	—N/a	—N/a	64×37 mm (2.5×1.5 in)	180 g (6.3 oz)	

The list is complete.

== See also ==
=== Canon ===
- List of Canon products
- Canon (company)
- Canon EOS
- Canon FD lens mount

=== Single lens reflex ===
- Single-lens reflex camera
- Digital single-lens reflex camera
- 135 film

	1964		1965	1966	1967	1968	1969	1970
Cameras		FX	Pellix	Pellix QL				
Cameras			FP	FT QL		TL		
