= Canon FD lens mount =

Standard lens mount on the Canon

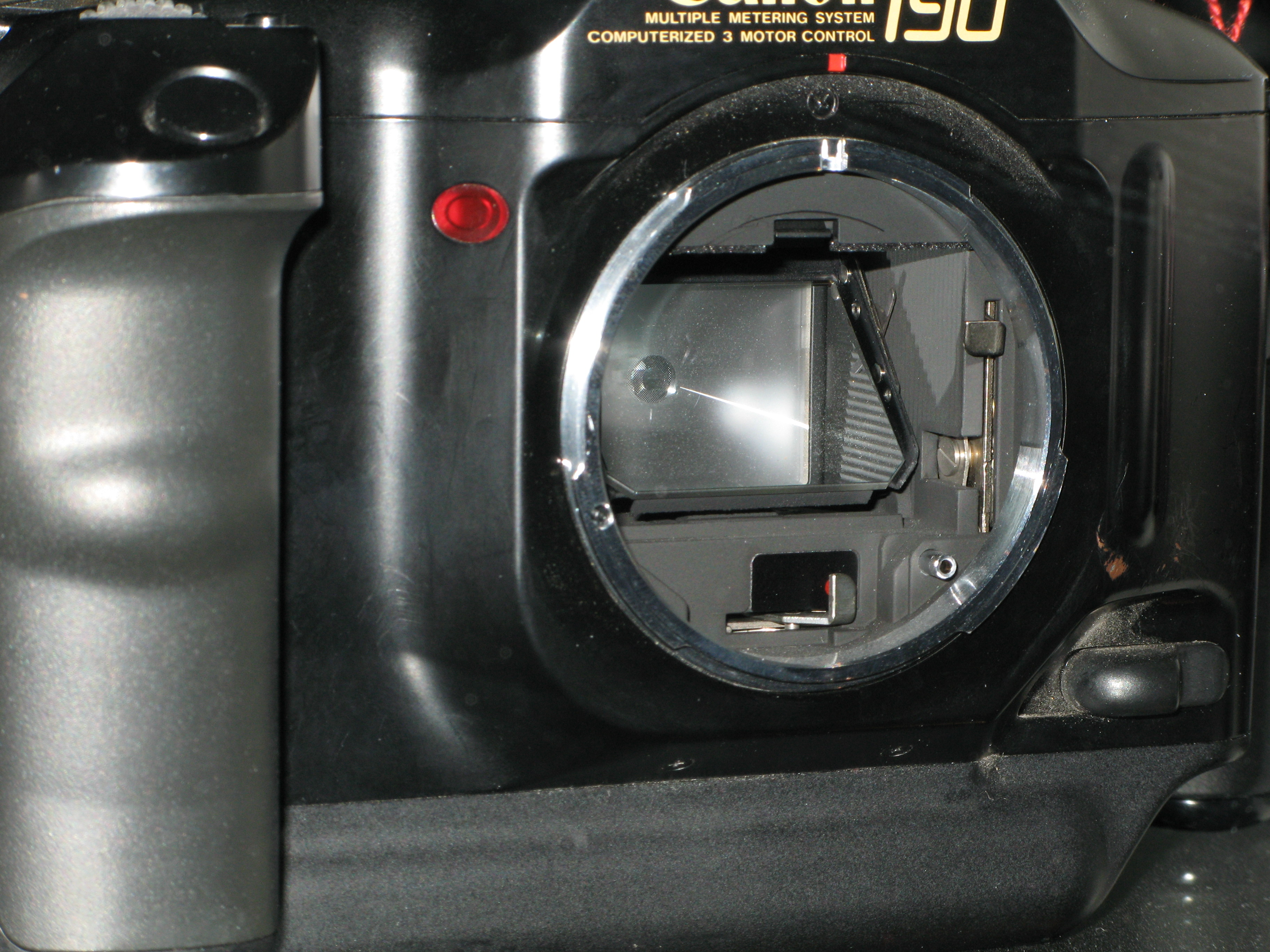
Lens mount of the Canon T90

The Canon FD lens mount is a physical standard for connecting a photographic lens to a 35mm single-lens reflex camera body. The standard was developed by Canon of Japan and was introduced in March 1971 with the Canon F-1 camera. It served as the Canon SLR interchangeable lens mounting system until the 1987 introduction of the Canon EOS series cameras, which use the newer EF lens mount. The FD mount lingered through the release of the 1990 Canon T60, the last camera introduced in the FD system, and the end of the Canon New F-1 product cycle in 1992.

== Overview ==
Canon manual focus lens / body compatibility
Body Lens		FD	FL	R
FD	Meter	Full	Stopped-down	
FD	Aperture	Auto		Manual
FL	Meter	Stopped-down		
FL	Aperture	Auto		Manual
R	Meter	Stopped-down		
R	Aperture	Manual		Manual/ Auto

The FD mount is mechanically compatible with and replaced Canon's earlier FL mount, which in turn had replaced the R mount; FD-mount cameras can use FL lenses in stop-down metering mode and R lenses will mount, but must be used with manual aperture and stop-down metering.

Though never officially explained by Canon, others have attempted to assign a meaning to the "FD" designation. One such attempt states that the "FD" notation stands for "Focal-plane shutter with Dual linkage for diaphragm control"; in actuality, there were two linkages and two signals: the automatic aperture lever, aperture signal lever, full aperture signal pin, and automatic exposure lock pin. This is twice the previous lens series, which used the "FL" designation, said to mean "Focal-plane shutter, Linked mount."

Over the 21-plus years of production, Canon introduced 134 different FD lenses ranging from 7.5mm through 1,200mm in seventeen different fixed focal lengths and nineteen different zoom ranges, one of the most, if not the most, extensive manual focus lens lines ever produced.

The Canon FD system enjoyed huge popularity in the 1970s and 1980s, when it established and grew a market share with professional photographers as well as having equipped over a million consumer users. Indeed, sales of the Canon AE-1 camera alone exceeded one million.

Canon obsoleted the FD mount by its decision to create the all-electronic EF mount. Thus, the FD mount system, with limited provision for auto-focus, is now commercially obsolete, and Canon FD cameras and lenses are available for low prices on the second-hand market. This makes the system very attractive to 35mm film photographers who demand the highest optical quality, while not needing auto focus capability.

FD lenses can be used on many mirrorless interchangeable-lens cameras with a suitable adapter. They are a popular alternative to modern lenses among some users, though they lack autofocus.

=== Description ===
Canon New FD lens mounting surface.

The FD lens mount is a breech-lock mount, which is a variation of the common triple-flanged bayonet attachment. The advantage of the breech-lock over the bayonet is that neither the contact surfaces between the body and lens, nor the signalling mechanisms, rotate against each other when the lens is mounted. This prevents any mechanical wear, which could conceivably reduce the very precise lens-to-film distance or introduce communication errors between lens and body.

The key pins and levers on the lens mount which transmit information mechanically between the lens and body include:

- Automatic/Manual Aperture Lever – stops down aperture to the position selected on the aperture ring when the shutter is released; this can be moved all the way anti-clockwise (viewing the rear of the lens) to force the lens to operate in manual aperture mode only, such as when the lens is mounted on an early camera body with the R mount
- Aperture Signal Lever – transmits the aperture selected on the lens to the in-body meter, which enables full-aperture viewing while providing accurate metering information
- Full Aperture Signal Pin – transmits the maximum aperture of the lens mounted on the body
- EE Switch Pin – signals the body when the lens is set for shutter-preferred autoexposure by moving the aperture ring to "A" or "o"

To mount the lens, the Positioning Pin is placed in the corresponding notch on the top bayonet lug (12 o'clock position) and the breech-lock ring (for first-generation FD lenses) or lens body (for New FD lenses) is rotated clockwise (facing the front of the lens) to lock the lens onto the body.

=== Versions ===
Canon's first generation of the FD breech-lock used the same rotating mounting ring at the rear of the lens as the earlier R- and FL-series lenses; the lens body itself did not rotate for mounting. There is a small pin which prevents movement of the breech-lock ring when the lens is not mounted on the camera. Its minor disadvantage was a somewhat slower lens change than a bayonet.

There are three different versions of breech ring FD lenses:

1. The first version had a chrome plated front barrel (nicknamed "chrome nose") and a green "o" for auto exposure.
2. The second version had a black front barrel and still had a green "o" for auto exposure.
3. The third version had a black front barrel, and a green "A" for auto exposure. These different versions are detailed below under variants.

Second-generation FD lenses, first marketed in 1979 as New FD, are mounted like bayonet-mount lenses in that the photographer twists the entire lens body to mount and dismount, though the actual mating surfaces still remain fixed. This retained the advantages of the breech-lock mount while enabling the convenience of a bayonet. The letters SC or SSC, to indicate the lens coating, were no longer put on the lenses. Canon documents stated that all new FD lenses except for the new FD 50mm F1.8 had SSC coatings. Canon later chose a bayonet-style mount for its EOS system's EF lenses, where there is no precision mechanical coupling.

=== Functions ===
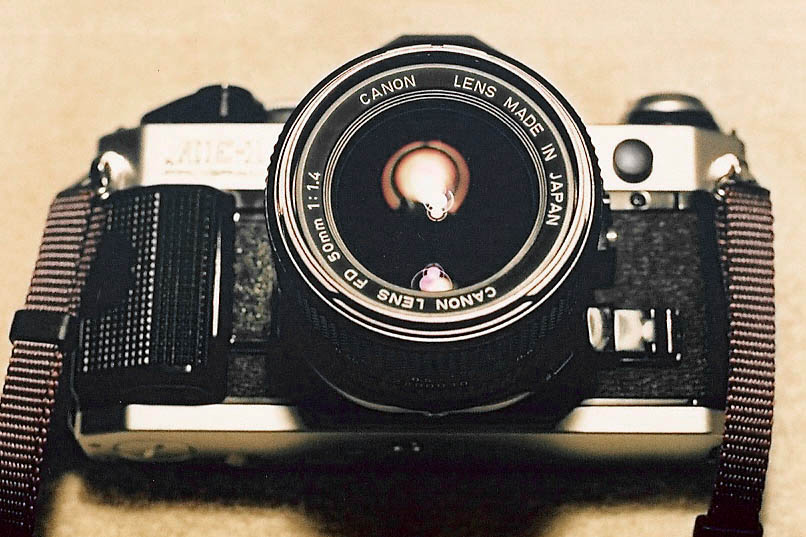
Canon FD 50 mm f/1.4 on AE-1 Program.

Like its FL predecessor, the FD mount system allowed automatic diaphragm function, but in addition, a new signal pin supported full-aperture metering. A second signal pin for the "auto" setting of the aperture dial, plus a linkage to allow the camera to set the degree of diaphragm opening, enabled integral auto-exposure. The first camera to use this was the 1971 Canon F-1, when equipped with the Servo EE Finder. Later, the Canon EF of 1973 had automatic exposure built-in, as did the very popular Canon A-series cameras (save the AT-1) beginning in 1976.

Thus, starting with the first FD lenses produced in late 1970, all FD lenses had the capability of supporting full-aperture metering and multiple Automatic Exposure (AE) modes using both shutter-preferred and aperture-preferred modes. Even Programmed AE was possible with no modifications to the lens mount, though at the time of its introduction Canon did not have an AE camera body in the FD line. This was a design triumph for Canon that no other camera or lens maker was able to equal in 1970. Every other camera manufacturer had to make one or more alterations to its lens mount to enable full aperture metering, and later AE and or Programmed AE operation.

The FD mount has no support for either electrical or mechanical lens-body communication required for autofocus, which was a primary reason for its retirement. (The three AC series lenses, extended from the FD lens mount, described below, are an exception). While Canon could have adapted its mount to support auto-focus, as did other manufacturers, the company instead chose to make a clean break with the past and design a completely new interface with support for electrical signaling and control.

== FD lens variants ==
=== Coatings and cosmetic changes ===
Canon FD lens versions

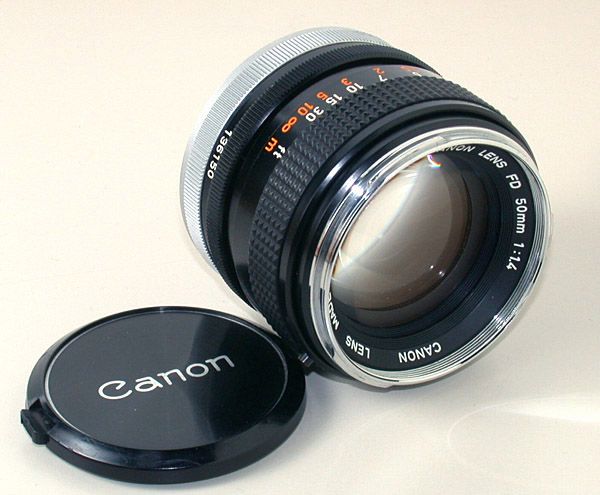
50 mm f/1.4, breech ring version 1 ("chrome nose")

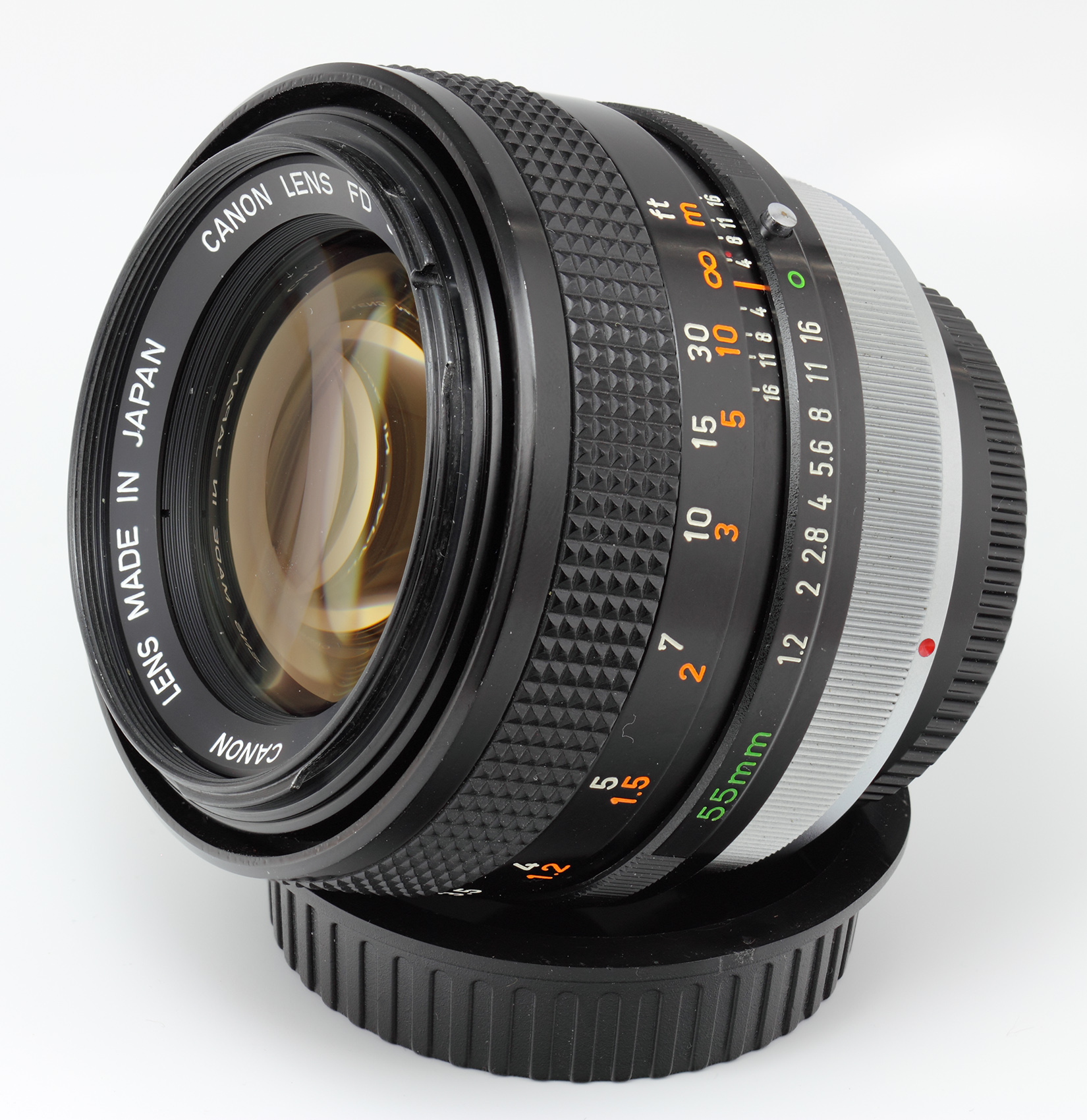
55 mm f/1.2 S.S.C., breech ring version 2 (black nose, green o)

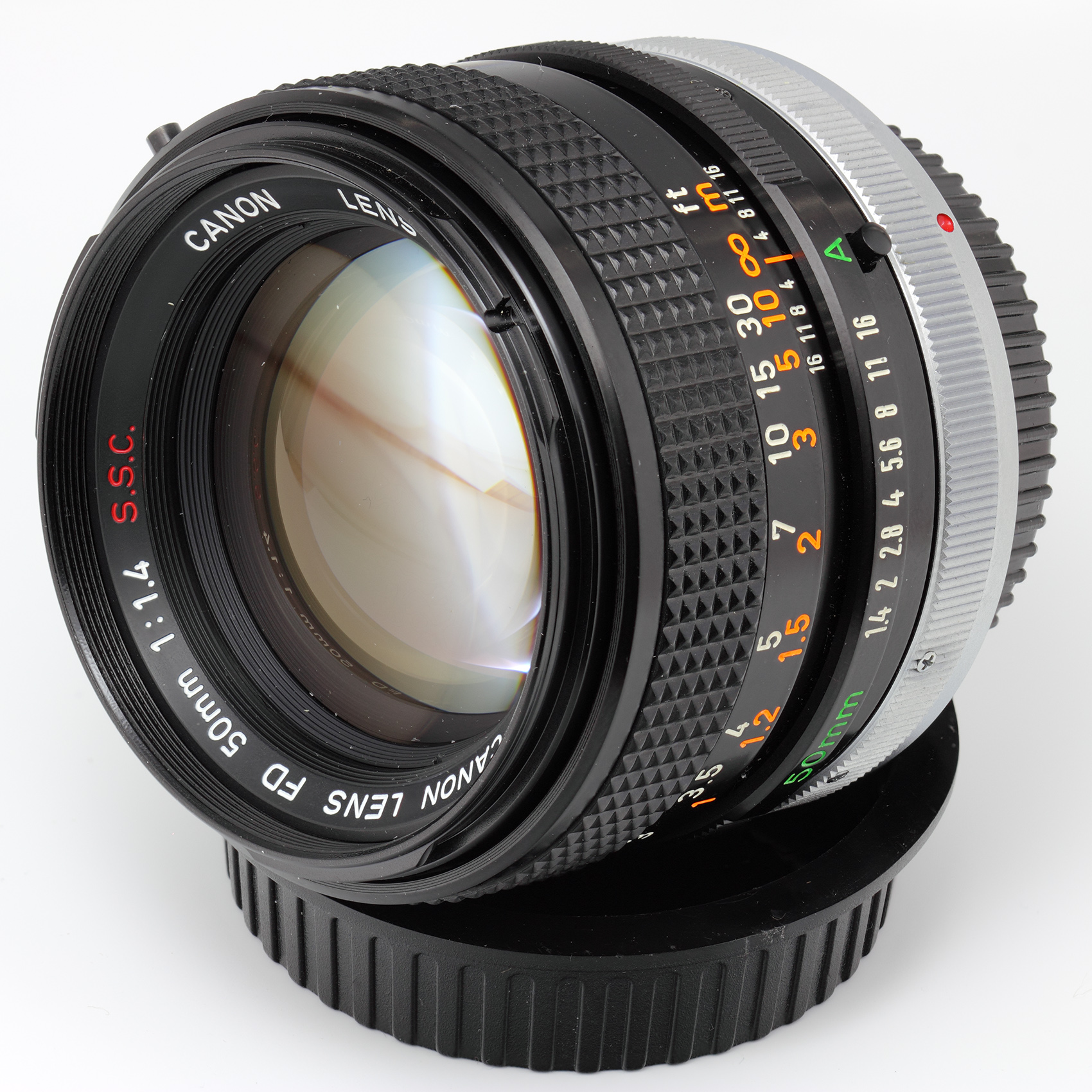
50 mm f/1.4 S.S.C., breech ring version 3 (black nose, green A)

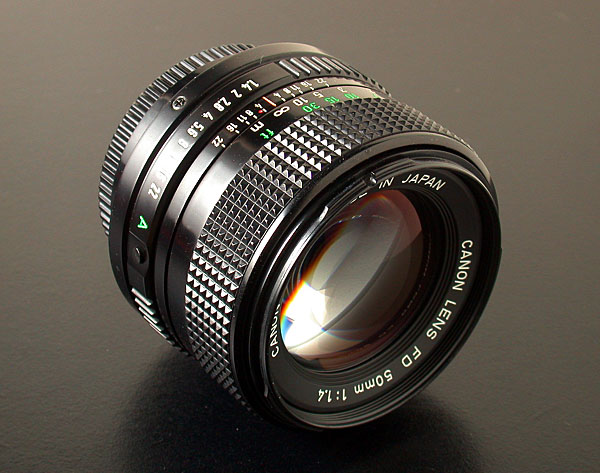
50 mm f/1.4, New FD

The earliest breech-lock Canon FD lenses (1970-1973) are generally recognizable by a chrome (silver) filter ring at the front (this ring includes its own bayonet used to mount an appropriate lens hood). Nicknamed 'chrome nose' lenses, these used two new proprietary lens coatings, designated "S.C." (Spectra Coating) and "S.S.C." (Super Spectra Coating), but neither coating was signified on the front of the lens. These were both multi-coatings, but indicated two quality grades. In the 'chrome nose' series, only the large-aperture 55mm f/1.2, and 55mm F1.2 AL (Aspherical) and the 7.5mm Fish-Eye lenses used S.S.C. coating. This first series of FD lenses shared other characteristics that would later change; the breech-lock ring can be rotated freely without mounting it on a camera body, and the aperture ring had a green "o" at the end of the scale to indicate automatic aperture operation, which at the time was only possible with an F-1 body that had the Servo EE Finder attached. The aperture ring could be rotated freely on and off of "o", although the small AE switch pin in the back of the lens (which came out when the aperture ring was rotated to "o") prevented one from doing this unless the body has the appropriate small hole in the proper location. There are chrome nose first generation FD lenses without chrome front barrels: several wide angle lenses and some telephoto lenses have black barrels, but their date code, lack of an aperture lock button and freely rotating breech ring place them into the first version FD lens group.

The second series of breech-lock FD lenses (1973-1976), which discontinued the chrome barrel front, is engraved "S.C." in white or "S.S.C." in red on the front of the lens. The S.S.C. coating was extended to most lenses in this series. The basic S.C. coating was, for the most part, limited to the least expensive lenses. These 2nd breech ring generation FD lenses still had a green "o", but now there was a chrome lock button on the aperture ring that had to be depressed to put the lens on or take the lens off of "o". One still could not put the lens on "o" unless the camera body had the AE switch pin hole. And the lens could not be mounted on a non-EE / AE body if the lens was set on "o". The breech ring now featured a lock which prevented it from rotating unless a rear cap was put on or the lens was mounted to a body. Further, the breech ring rotated slightly when the lens was mounted to aid in getting the lens securely mounted. The aperture diaphragm was opened fully when the breech ring was in the locked position.

The third variant, made from 1976 to the end of production of breech ring FD lenses (around 1980) changed the green "o" to a green "A" and the chrome aperture ring lock button was changed from chrome to black. The breech ring was still locked unless mounted and it still had the spring loaded twist to make it easier to mount the lens. The third version FD 50mm F1.8 lens also received a plastic front barrel to reduce size and weight. This corresponded with the introduction of the Canon A-series cameras which were smaller and lighter than the older, larger and heavier "F-series" bodies.

In 1978, with the introduction of the New FD series (nicknamed 'FDn'), the coating type was no longer specified on the lens front. All of these lenses received S.S.C. coating, with the sole exception of the 50mm f/1.8 lens. New FD lenses are easily identifiable by the replacement of the breech ring with a square metal release button at the base of the lens. When installing the lens, the entire body rotates except for the mating surfaces. This design allowed for the benefits of the precision breech lock and the ease of a bayonet mount.

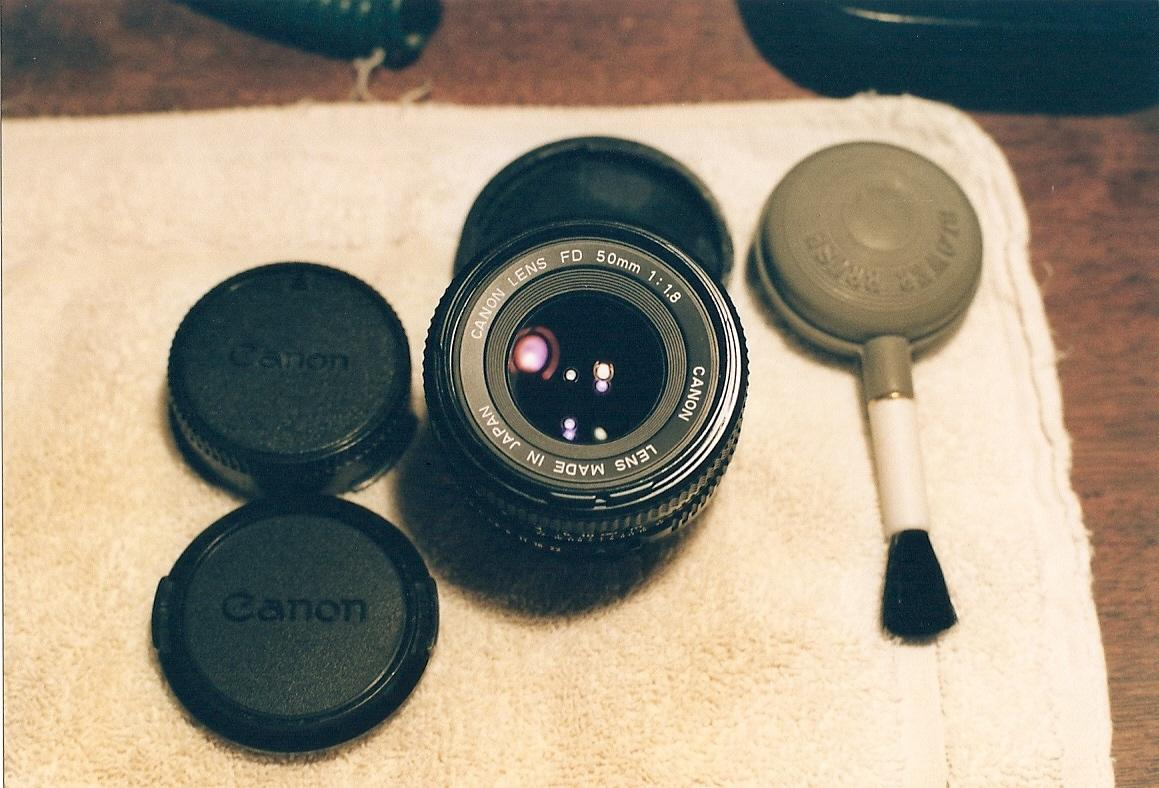
Canon New FD 50 mm f/1.8 with caps.

The original breech-lock FD lenses and the New FD lenses are completely functionally interchangeable, and may each be used on any FD camera body. A minor operational difference between New FD and earlier lenses occurs only when using a Canon New F-1 body with the AE Finder FN in aperture preferred AE mode. The New FD lenses' aperture rings were placed closer to the rear of the lens so that the aperture value is visible in the new F-1's viewfinder, via an optical prism. Earlier lenses' aperture scales do not align properly with the prism, and are therefore not visible.

=== Aspherical, Fluorite or 'L' lenses ===
L-series lenses

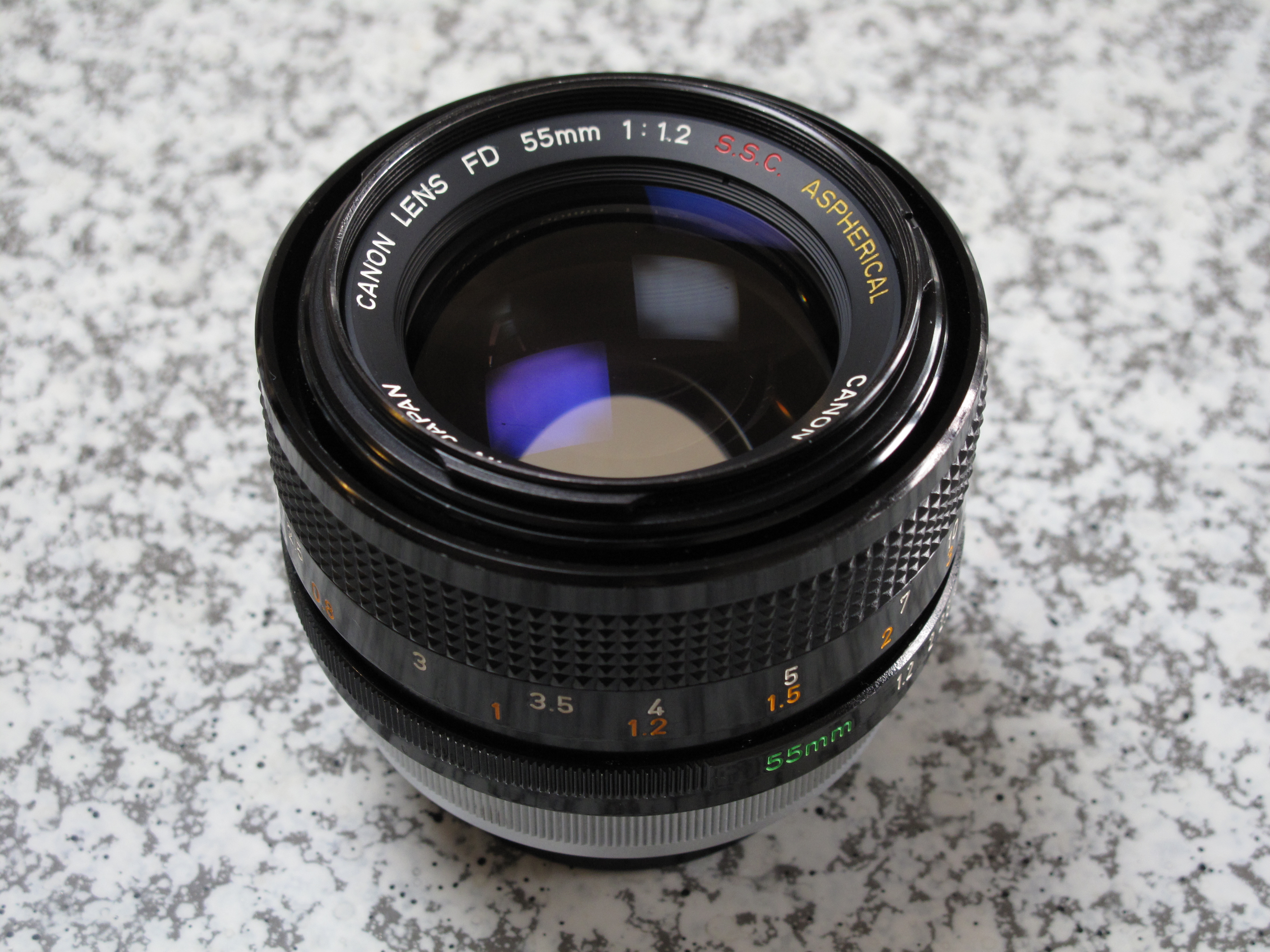
FD 55 mm f/1.2 S.S.C. Aspherical

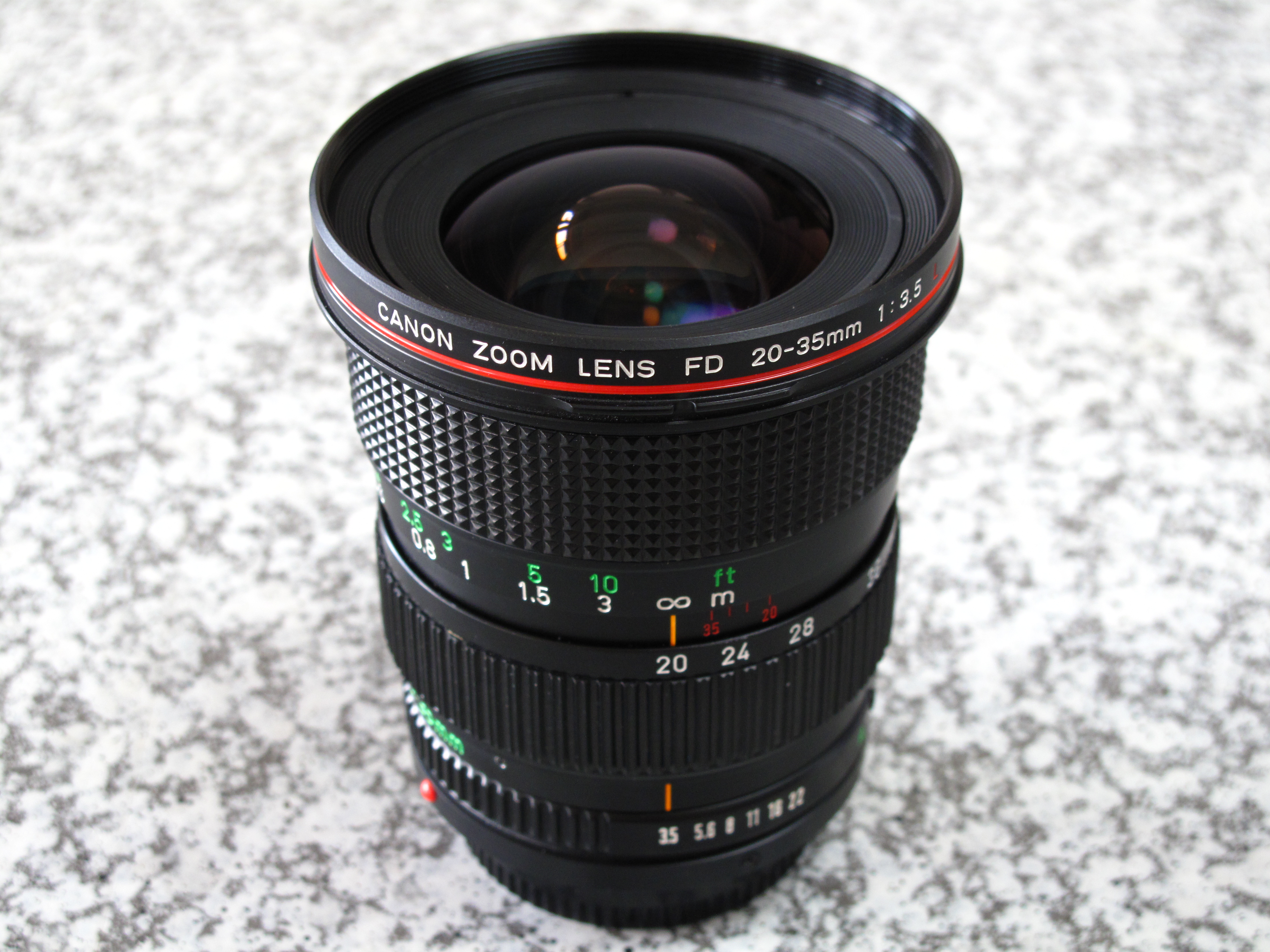
New FD 20–35 mm f/3.5L, with red ring

An enhanced range of FD lenses was available to photographers who required the highest optical and mechanical performance. In addition to more robust mechanical construction, these lenses used a variety of special technologies, including ground aspherical surfaces, fluorite optical elements, and ultra-low-dispersion glass. Canon used these means to achieve outstanding optical performance at the extremes of lens design: wide apertures and extreme focal lengths. Aspherical surfaces improved performance of wide-angle and standard lenses at very wide apertures. Ultra-low dispersion and fluorite elements virtually eliminated chromatic aberration at long focal lengths.

The earlier versions of these lenses carried "AL", "Aspherical", or "Fluorite" indications on the front of the lens. The post-1979 'New FD' versions acknowledged all the exotic technologies under the single designation "L" (commonly believed to indicate 'luxury' or 'asphericaL'). Canon has continued the "L" designation, and the famous red ring around the lens front, in the current EF and RF autofocus lenses for EOS cameras, where the symbol now officially stands for "Luxury."

=== Macro lenses ===
The FD series included a number of zoom lenses with close-focusing mechanisms, targeted at amateur photographers. The series also included three true macro lenses at 50mm, 100mm, and 200mm. These offered exceptionally close focusing and were corrected for flatness of field at close shooting distances. The 50mm and 100mm were marketed with extension tubes that allowed life-size reproduction. The 200mm can reach life size without additional extension.

=== Special-purpose lenses ===
Canon offered seven specialty lenses for the FD mount. The 35mm f/2.8 Tilt-Shift lens is a perspective control lens which includes controls to shift the lens off-axis by ±11mm for perspective control. In addition to shift, it may be tilted ±8 degrees for depth of field control; both movements are possible simultaneously. Though it uses the breech-lock mount, it is not literally an FD lens since its diaphragm is operated manually and it must be used with stop-down metering.

The 85mm f/2.8 Soft Focus lens is designed for portraiture. The photographer may introduce three levels of spherical aberration by sliding the focusing ring forward or backward. Since aperture also affects the magnitude of the soft focus effect, a wide range of results are possible. The lens may also be used as a standard short telephoto. It offers all FD features.

The Reflex 500mm f/8 lens is a supertelephoto catadioptric lens of high optical quality which shares the unique characteristics of all mirror lenses with a central obstruction. Since its aperture is fixed at f/8, it lacks FD signals and controls. It must be used in manual or stopped-down metering mode.

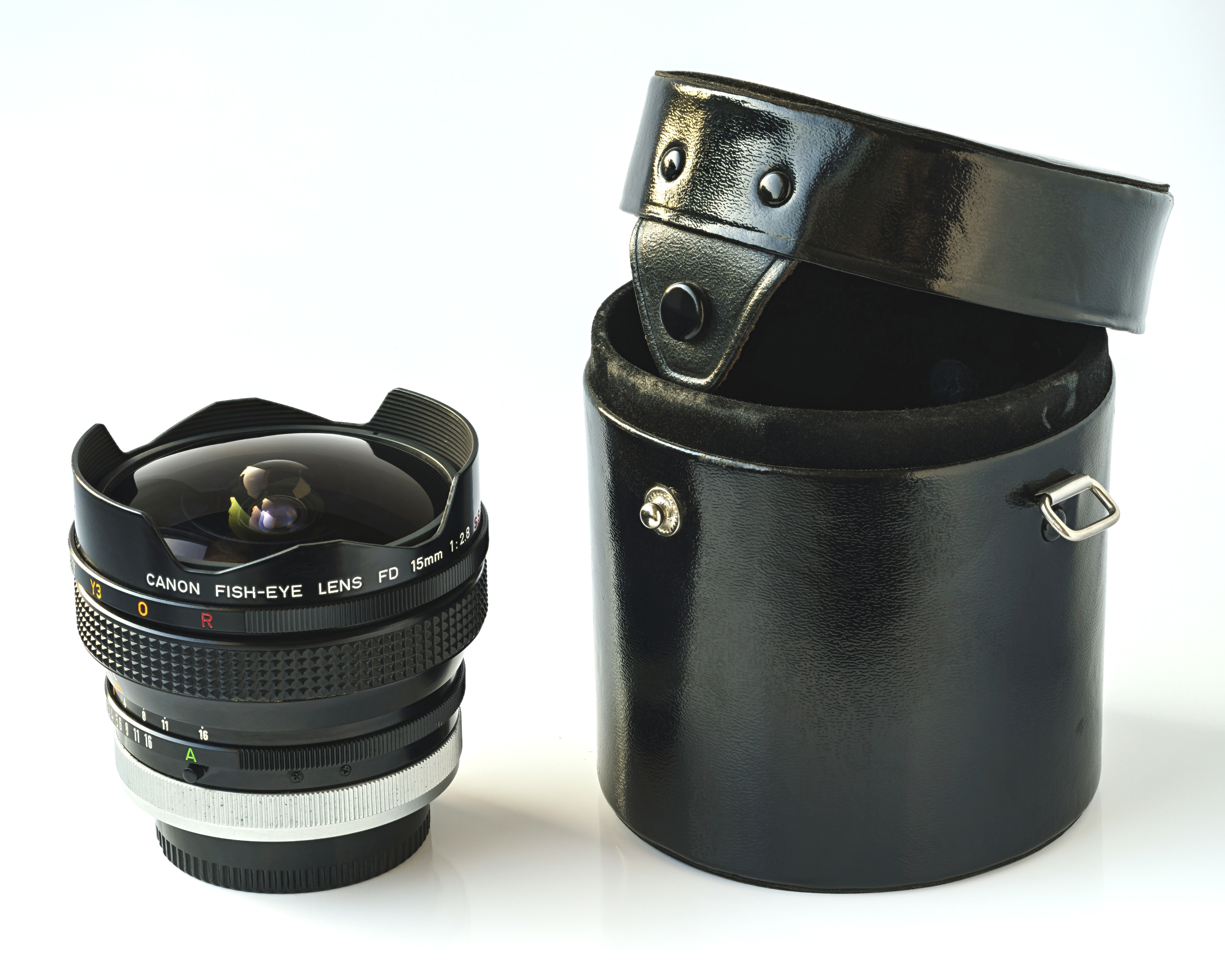
Fish-Eye FD 15 mm f/2.8 and storage case

Canon also produced two fisheye lenses. The 7.5mm f/5.6 is a circular fisheye, rendering a 180 degree field of view in a 23mm image circle. It is technically a FL lens, as it requires manual diapragm operation and stopped-down metering. The 15mm f/2.8 is a full-frame fisheye, rendering a 180 degree field of view across the diagonal of the 35mm frame with the considerable barrel distortion of a fisheye lens. It includes all FD features and may be used with automatic exposure. Both lenses include internal filters.

The remaining specialty lenses are the 20mm f/3.5 and 35mm f/2.8 Macrophoto lenses. Similar to microscope objectives, they provide magnifications of 4X-10X and 2X-6X respectively when mounted on the FD Auto Bellows. They can only be used with a bellows, via an FD adapter; while the adapter can mechanically mount them directly to a camera, they cannot function optically. They are not properly FD lenses, but are listed here because they are part of the whole system.

== FD autofocusing lenses ==
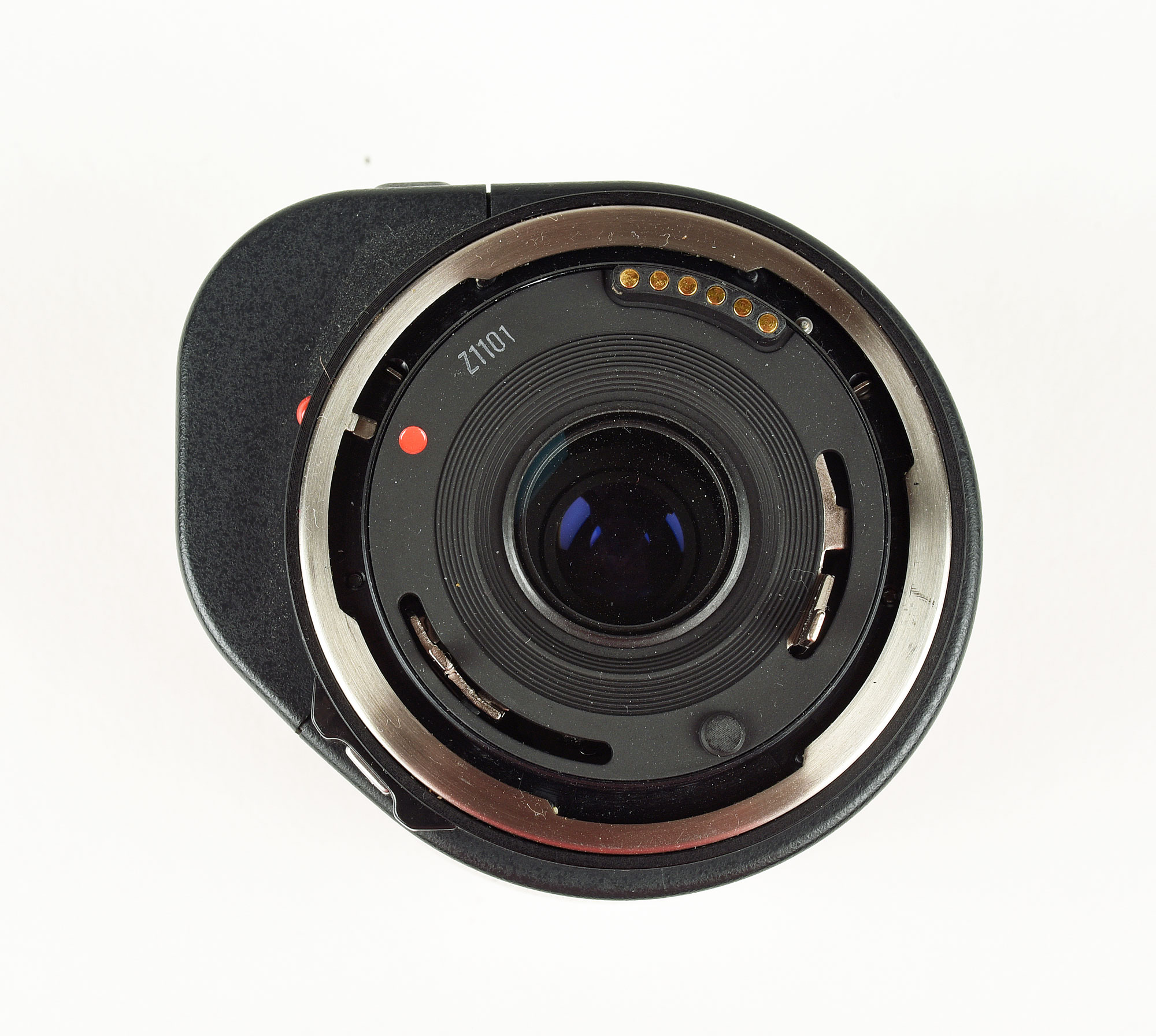
Canon AC 35–70 f/3.5–4.5 lens mount; compared to the conventional FD mount, there are six pogo pin contacts instead of the "Reserved" mechanical pin.

Before the FD mount was obsoleted by the EOS system, Canon built four autofocus lenses. Of these, only the FD 35-70mm f/4 AF was capable of autofocus on all FD cameras. The others, known as AC lenses, offered autofocus only on the T80 camera.

The FD 35-70mm f/4 AF contained an entirely independent autofocus system and was among the world's first autofocus zoom lenses (the Pentax ME F was the first ). The autofocus system was activated by a button on the side of the lens, and involved no communication with the camera body. It was reasonably accurate with still subjects, but was too slow to be a practical solution for moving subjects such as sports.

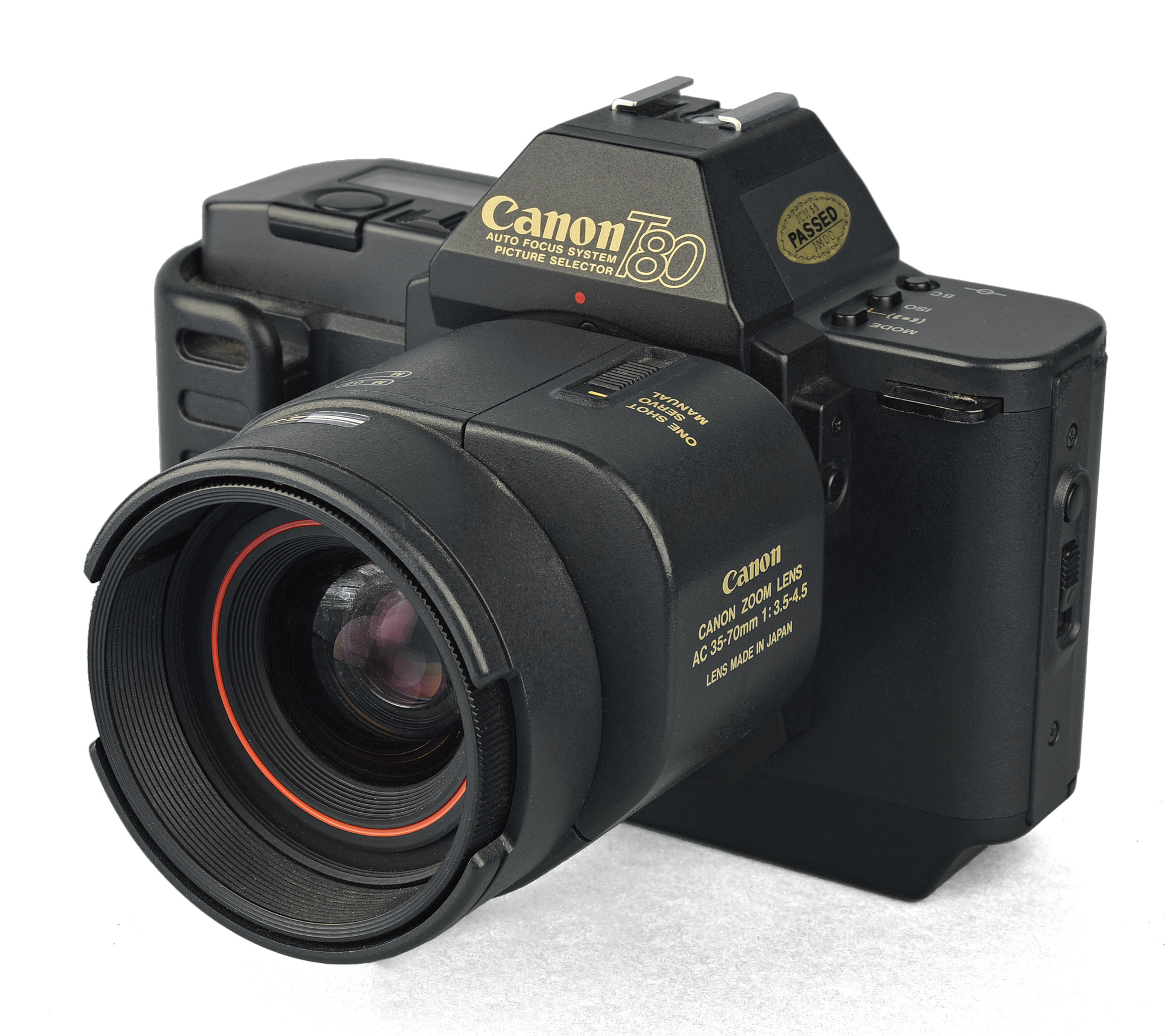
Canon T80 with AC 35–70 mm f/3.5–4.5

Further development produced the AC derivative of the FD mount. Three AC lenses were manufactured, the AC 50mm f/1.8, AC 35-70mm f/3.5-4.5, and AC 75-200mm f/4.5. All were released in April, 1985 alongside the Canon T80 camera, which was the only camera ever manufactured to take advantage of the AC lenses' AF capabilities. The lenses communicated with the T80 via a modified FD mount with added electrical contacts. They lacked an aperture ring, and were therefore usable only in automatic-exposure modes. They were otherwise identical to the FD mount and could be manually focused on those FD-mount cameras that could control the aperture. The AC line proved to be a dead-end development in light of the EF series development, and Canon would abandon the capability in the three remaining FD-mount cameras it produced, the New F-1, T90, and T60.

== Using FD lenses on other mounts ==
The 42mm flange focal distance of the FD mount is shorter than that of most other lens mounts. Therefore, some lenses from other period cameras with longer flange focal distance can be mounted on Canon FD-mount cameras with appropriate adapters and still retain infinity focus. FD lenses can be adapted to other cameras with longer flange focal distances, though the lenses cannot focus to infinity unless the adapter contains an optical correction element which may compromise image quality, as it is not part of the original FD lens optical design.

Following the introduction of the EOS camera line, whose EF lens mount has a 44 mm flange focal distance, Canon briefly marketed an adapter which enabled certain FD telephoto lenses to be used on EOS bodies. The adapter contained high-quality corrective optics and functioned as a 1.26x tele-converter; it could not be used on lenses shorter than 200mm in focal length, nor any lens that interfered with its protruding optics. The adapter was produced in limited numbers, with the intent of easing the initial cost of conversion for professional users who owned expensive FD telephoto lenses. Originally priced at $250, these adapters are now scarce and highly valued, selling for around $1,000 on the second-hand market. Other inexpensive aftermarket FD to EOS adapters are available and can be used at the cost of severely reduced image quality, particularly at large apertures.

Mechanically inclined photographers and technicians have successfully retrofitted FD lenses with alternative mounts, including the Arri PL mount and Canon EF mount.

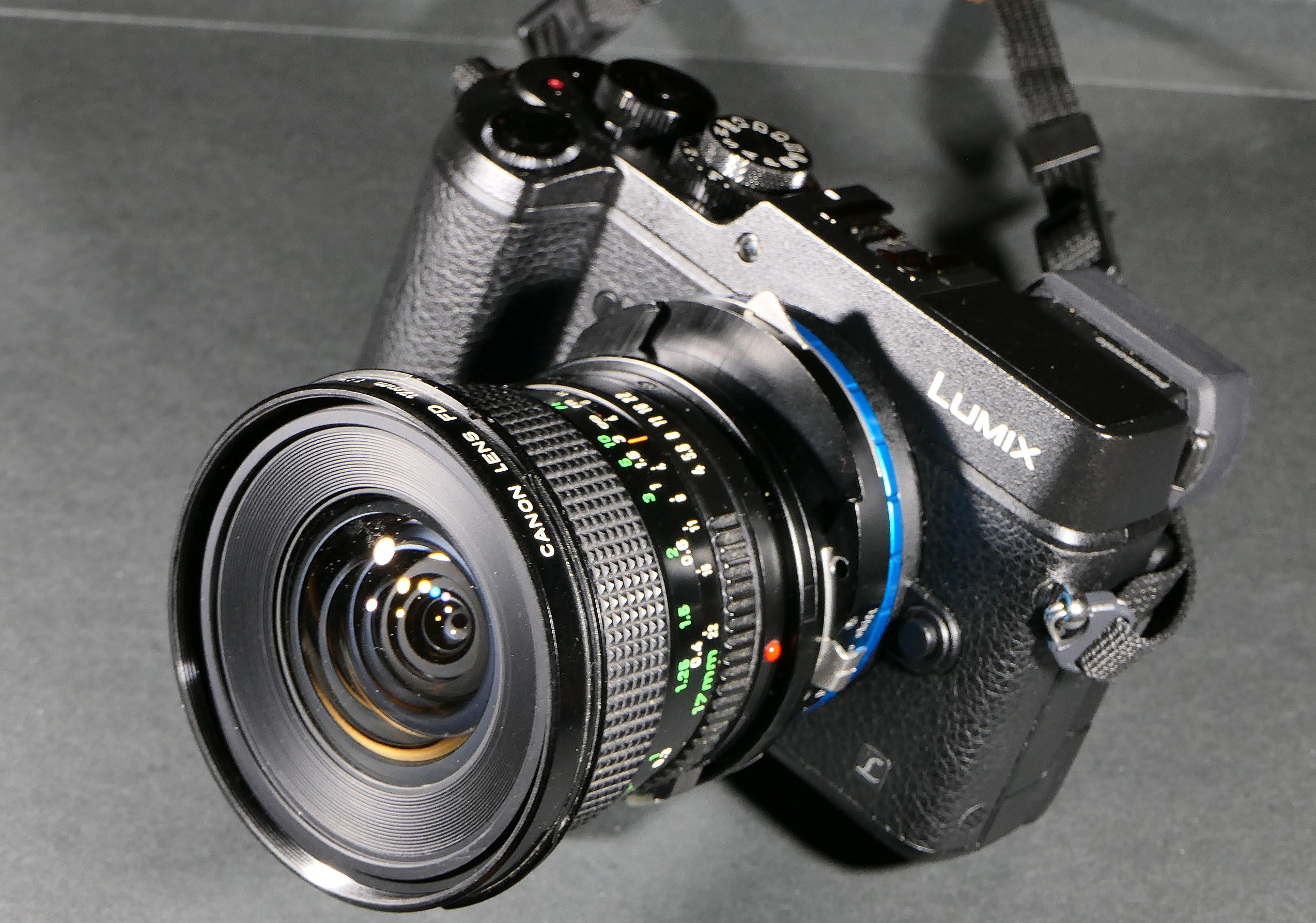
New FD 17 mm f/4 mounted on a μ4/3 camera, Panasonic Lumix DMC-GX8, using a shifting adapter

FD lenses can be mounted on Canon rangefinder cameras or other Leica screw mount cameras using the Canon Lens Mount Adapter B, but rangefinder-coupled focusing is lost.

FD lenses have been regularly used with the Micro Four Thirds system since its introduction in 2008. It has a flange focal distance of only 20mm and a 2× crop factor, halving the field of view compared to the original 24x36mm film frame.

As of 2012, with the introduction of the Canon EOS M mirrorless camera, almost all FD or FL lenses can be successfully adapted with infinity focus available without the need for a compensating lens, thus not compromising resolution, contrast and distortion performance. The EOS-M has an 18 megapixel APS-C sensor, offering image quality and resolution equivalent to other Canon EF-S APS-C sized sensors, retaining their 1.6× crop factor. The FD/FL lens must be manually focused and metering is done with aperture priority.

FD lenses can also be mounted to current mirrorless digital cameras with short flange focal distance, using simple mechanical adapters without optical correction. FD lenses, especially wide and ultra-wide f/2.8, f/2 and f/1.4 variants, have proven popular options for videography for these mirrorless formats.

== List of Canon-made FD-mount camera bodies and lenses ==
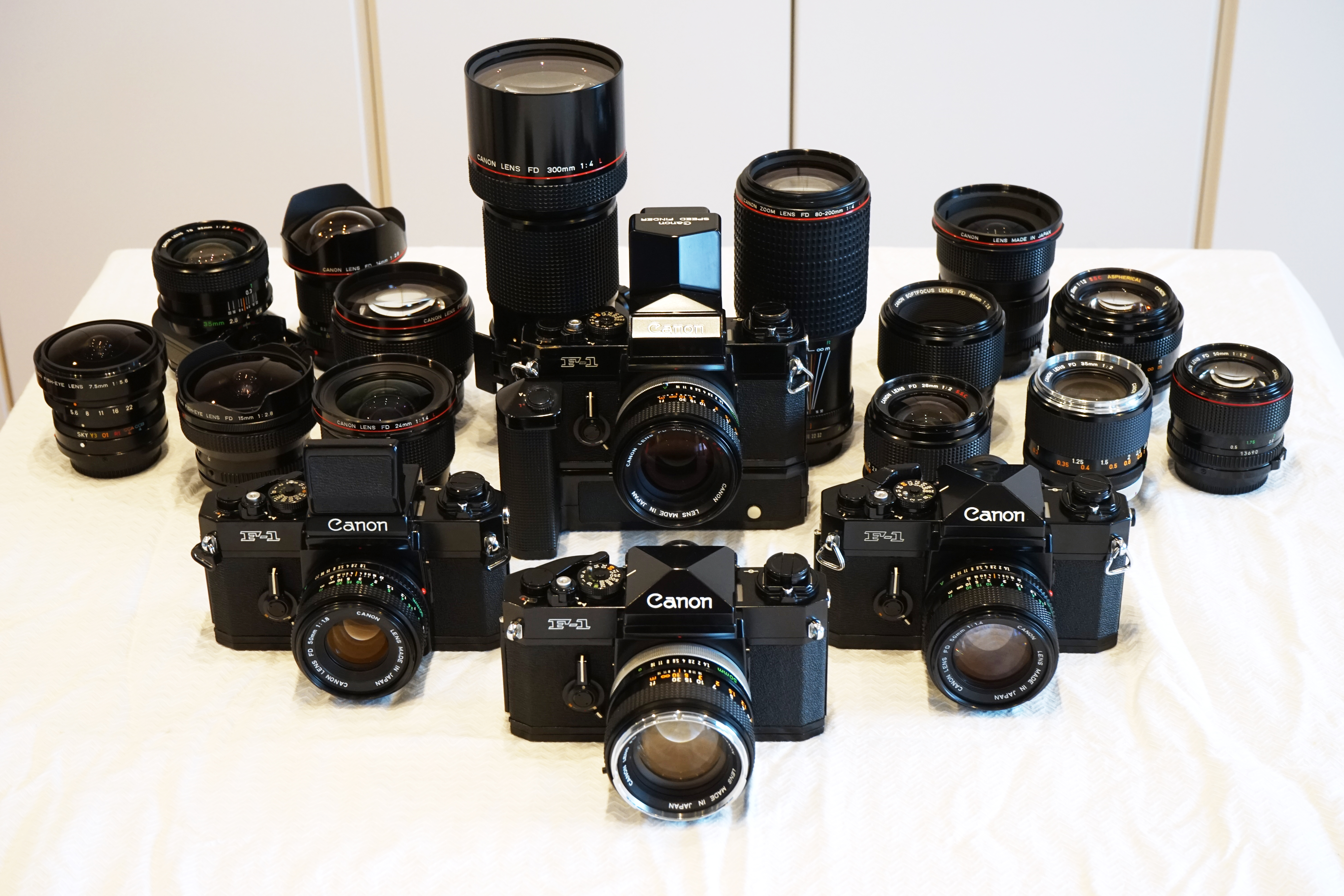
Canon F-1 and F-1n cameras, with FD lenses

=== FD cameras ===
- Canon F-1 (1971)
- Canon FTb (1971)
- Canon FTbn (1973)
- Canon EF (1973)
- Canon TLb (1974)
- Canon TX (1975)
- Canon F-1n (slight revision of 1971 F-1) (1976)
- Canon AE-1 (1976)
- Canon AT-1 (1976)
- Canon A-1 (1978)
- Canon AV-1 (1979)
- Canon New F-1 (total redesign of the F-1) (1981)
- Canon AE-1 Program (1981)
- Canon AL-1 (1982)
- Canon T50 (1983)
- Canon T70 (1984)
- Canon T80 (1985)
- Canon T90 (1986)
- Canon T60 (1990)

	1971	1972	1973	1974	1975	1976	1977	1978	1979	1980	1981	1982	1983	1984	1985	1986	1987	1988	1989	1990	1991	1992	1993
Professional																T90							
Professional		F-1 High Speed Motor Drive Camera												New F-1 High Speed Motor Drive Camera									
Professional	F-1						F-1N / F-1 (Later Model)					New F-1											
Amateur				EF					A-1														
Amateur															T70								
Amateur	FTb			FTb-N			AE-1					AE-1 Program											
Amateur					TLb					AV-1			AL-1			T80							
Amateur					TX		AT-1							T50							T60		

=== FD lenses ===
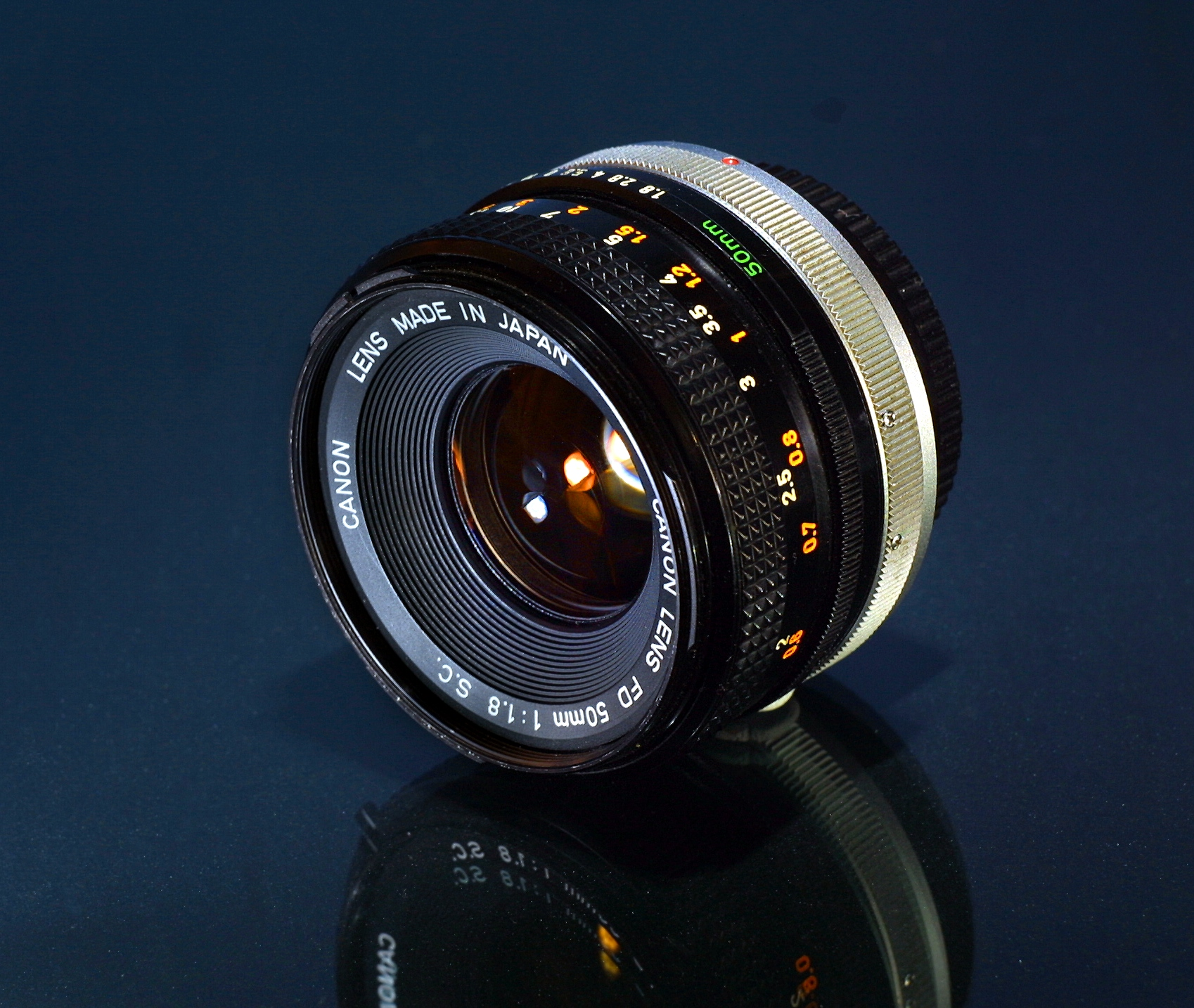
FD 50mm f/1.8 S.C. (chrome locking ring)

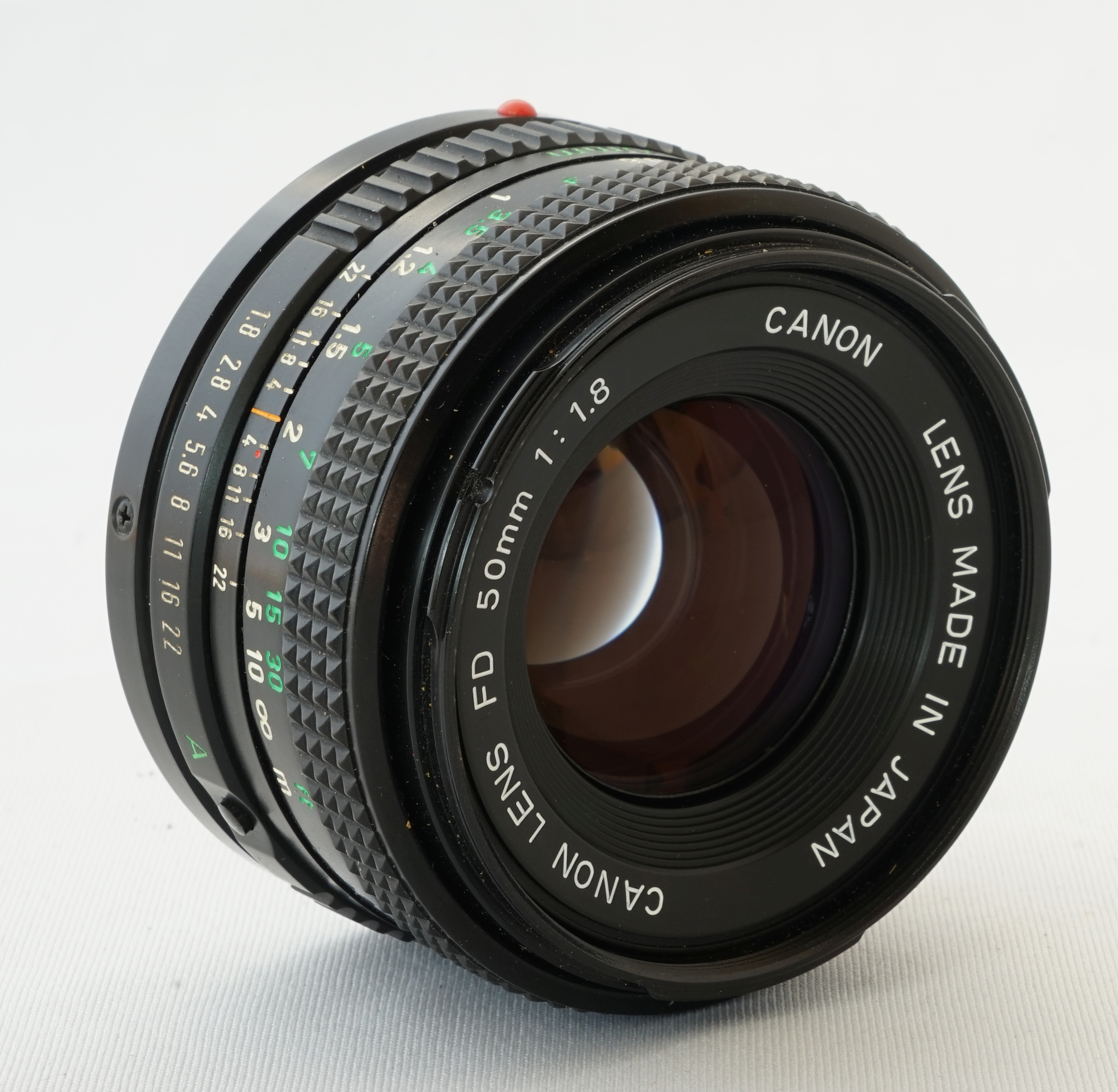
New FD 50mm f/1.8

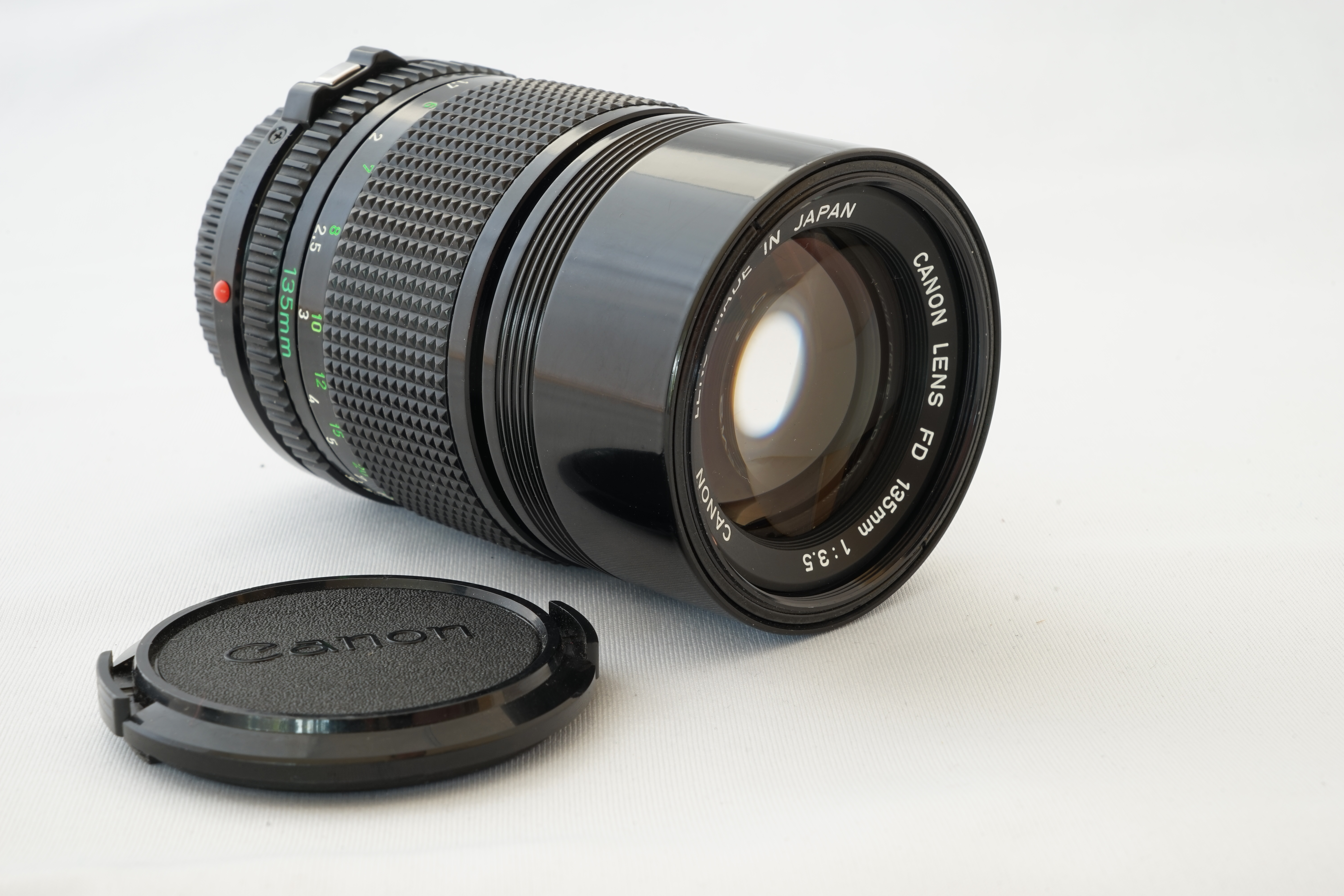
New FD 135mm f/3.5; note chrome locking button

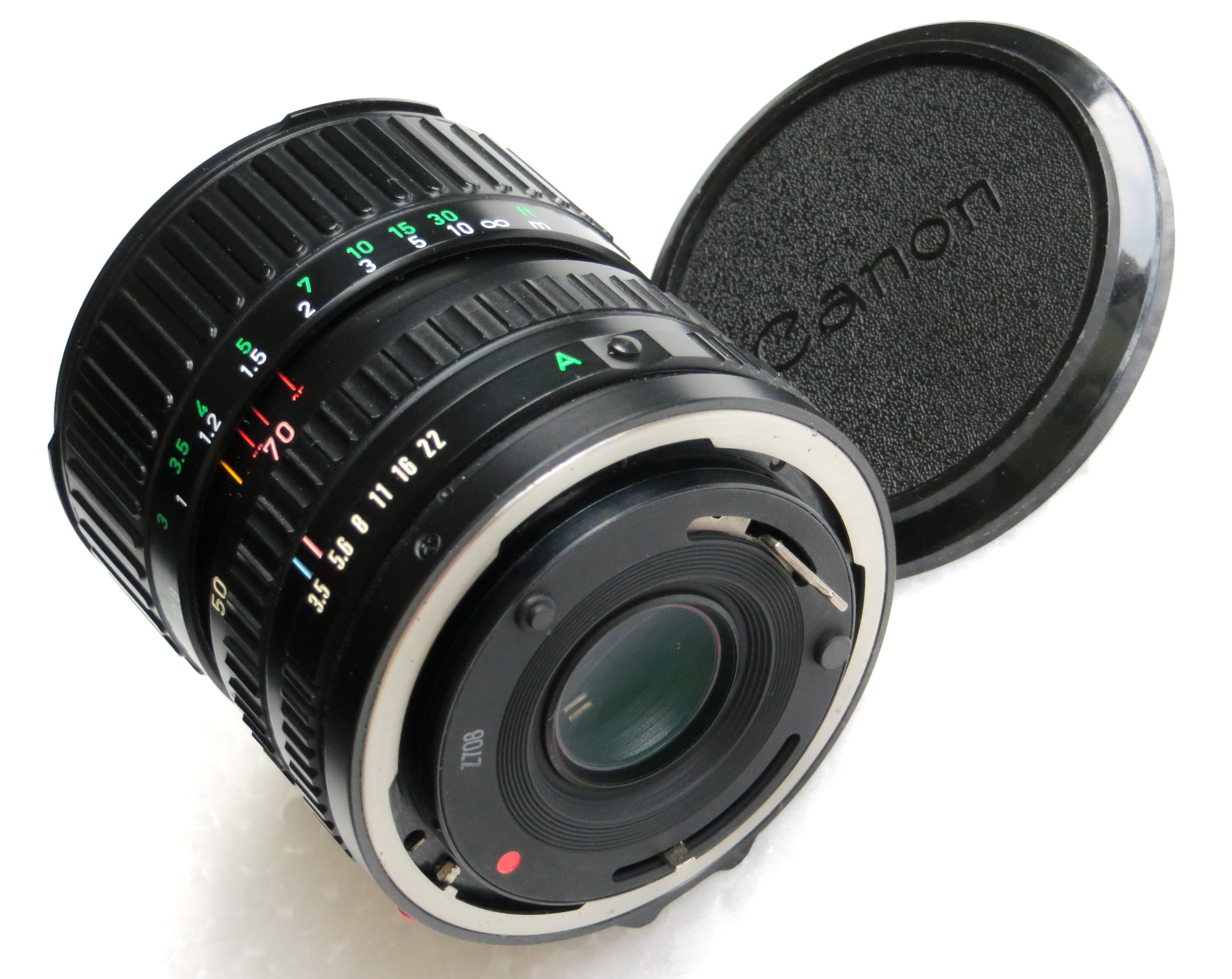
New FD 35-70mm f/3.5–4.5

The FD series includes lenses of all standard focal lengths ranging from 7.5mm to 800mm. At least two different maximum apertures were offered at each focal length from 24mm to 500mm.

The original generation of FD lenses featured a silver colored locking ring at the base, similar to the preceding FL and R series lenses. Only the locking ring turns to lock the lens to the camera body; the lens body remains stationary. The later New FD lenses have a black mount which includes a chrome lens release button.

Note that some lenses listed below were marketed in only one generation. Lenses of identical focal lengths and maximum apertures that spanned both generations, in addition to their altered mounts, were typically smaller and lighter in the New FD generation, and usually used smaller diameter filters.

Canon FD and New FD lenses
Focal length (mm)	Name	Aperture	Year	Construc. (Ele/Grp)	Min. focus (Mag.)	Filter (mm)	Dia. × Len.	Wgt.	Notes
Fisheye lenses
7.5	Fish-Eye FD 7.5mm f/5.6	f/5.6–22	Jan 1971	11/8	fixed, 0.3 m (1.0 ft) (0.027×)	built-in	72×62 mm (2.8×2.4 in)	380 g (13 oz)	
7.5	Fish-Eye FD 7.5mm f/5.6 S.S.C.	f/5.6–22	Feb 1973	11/8	fixed, 0.3 m (1.0 ft) (0.027×)	built-in	72×62 mm (2.8×2.4 in)	380 g (13 oz)	
7.5	New Fish-Eye 7.5mm f/5.6	f/5.6–22	Jun 1979	11/8	fixed, 0.3 m (1.0 ft) (0.027×)	built-in	72×62 mm (2.8×2.4 in)	380 g (13 oz)	
15	Fish-Eye FD 15mm f/2.8 S.S.C.	f/2.8–16	Apr 1973	10/9	0.3 m (1.0 ft) (0.056×)	built-in	76×60.5 mm (3.0×2.4 in)	485 g (17.1 oz)	
15	New Fish-Eye FD 15mm f/2.8	f/2.8–16	Jan 1980	10/9	0.2 m (0.7 ft) (0.14×)	built-in	76×60.5 mm (3.0×2.4 in)	460 g (16 oz)	
Ultra wide angle lenses
14	New FD 14mm f/2.8L	f/2.8–22	Jul 1982	14/10	0.25 m (0.8 ft) (0.099×)	rear, gel	74×83.5 mm (2.9×3.3 in)	490 g (17 oz)	
17	FD 17mm f/4	f/4–22	Mar 1971	11/9	0.25 m (0.8 ft) (0.1×)	72	75×56 mm (3.0×2.2 in)	490 g (17 oz)	
17	FD 17mm f/4 S.S.C.	f/4–22	Mar 1973	11/9	0.25 m (0.8 ft) (0.1×)	72	75×56 mm (3.0×2.2 in)	450 g (16 oz)	
17	New FD 17mm f/4	f/4–22	Dec 1979	11/9	0.25 m (0.8 ft) (0.1×)	72	76.5×56 mm (3.0×2.2 in)	360 g (13 oz)	
20	FD 20mm f/2.8 S.S.C.	f/2.8–22	Mar 1973	10/9	0.25 m (0.8 ft) (0.126×)	72	75×58 mm (3.0×2.3 in)	345 g (12.2 oz)	
20	New FD 20mm f/2.8	f/2.8–22	Dec 1979	10/9	0.25 m (0.8 ft) (0.13×)	72	76.5×58 mm (3.0×2.3 in)	305 g (10.8 oz)	
Wide angle lenses
24	FD 24mm f/1.4 S.S.C. Aspherical	f/1.4–16	Mar 1975	10/8	0.3 m (1.0 ft) (0.117×)	72	75×68 mm (3.0×2.7 in)	500 g (18 oz)	
24	New FD 24mm f/1.4L	f/1.4–16	Dec 1979	10/8	0.3 m (1.0 ft) (0.12×)	72	76.5×68 mm (3.0×2.7 in)	430 g (15 oz)	
24	New FD 24mm f/2	f/2–22	Jun 1979	11/9	0.3 m (1.0 ft) (0.11×)	52	63×50.6 mm (2.5×2.0 in)	285 g (10.1 oz)	
24	FD 24mm f/2.8	f/2.8–16	Mar 1971	9/8	0.3 m (1.0 ft) (0.114×)	55	66×52.5 mm (2.6×2.1 in)	410 g (14 oz)	
24	FD 24mm f/2.8 S.S.C.	f/2.8–16	Mar 1973	9/8	0.3 m (1.0 ft) (0.114×)	55	66×52.5 mm (2.6×2.1 in)	330 g (12 oz)	
24	New FD 24mm f/2.8	f/2.8–22	Jun 1979	10/9	0.3 m (1.0 ft) (0.11×)	52	63×43 mm (2.5×1.7 in)	240 g (8.5 oz)	
28	FD 28mm f/2 S.S.C.	f/2–22	Nov 1975	9/8	0.3 m (1.0 ft) (0.135×)	55	66×61 mm (2.6×2.4 in)	343 g (12.1 oz)	
28	New FD 28mm f/2	f/2–22	Jun 1979	10/9	0.3 m (1.0 ft) (0.13×)	52	63×47.2 mm (2.5×1.9 in)	265 g (9.3 oz)	
28	FD 28mm f/2.8 S.C. (I)	f/2.8–22	Mar 1975	7/7	0.3 m (1.0 ft) (0.134×)	55	64.6×49 mm (2.5×1.9 in)	280 g (9.9 oz)	
28	FD 28mm f/2.8 S.C. (II)	f/2.8–22	Nov 1977	7/7	0.3 m (1.0 ft) (0.134×)	55	65×47.2 mm (2.6×1.9 in)	230 g (8.1 oz)	
28	New FD 28mm f/2.8	f/2.8–22	Jun 1979	7/7	0.3 m (1.0 ft) (0.13×)	52	63×40 mm (2.5×1.6 in)	170 g (6.0 oz)	
28	FD 28mm f/3.5	f/3.5–16	Mar 1971	6/6	0.4 m (1.3 ft) (0.084×)	55	64×43 mm (2.5×1.7 in)	290 g (10 oz)	
28	FD 28mm f/3.5 S.C.	f/3.5–16	Mar 1973	6/6	0.4 m (1.3 ft) (0.084×)	55	64×43 mm (2.5×1.7 in)	250 g (8.8 oz)	
35	FD 35mm f/2 (I)	f/2–16	Mar 1971	9/8	0.3 m (1.0 ft) (0.194×)	55	64×60 mm (2.5×2.4 in)	420 g (15 oz)	
35	FD 35mm f/2 (II)	f/2–16	?	9/8	0.3 m (1.0 ft) (0.194×)	55	67×60 mm (2.6×2.4 in)	420 g (15 oz)	
35	FD 35mm f/2 (III)	f/2–16	Jan 1973	9/8	0.3 m (1.0 ft) (0.194×)	55	67×60 mm (2.6×2.4 in)	420 g (15 oz)	
35	FD 35mm f/2 S.S.C. (I)	f/2–16	Mar 1973	9/8	0.3 m (1.0 ft) (0.194×)	55	64×60 mm (2.5×2.4 in)	370 g (13 oz)	
35	FD 35mm f/2 S.S.C. (II)	f/2–22	Apr 1976	9/8	0.3 m (1.0 ft) (0.194×)	55	65.3×60 mm (2.6×2.4 in)	345 g (12.2 oz)	
35	New FD 35mm f/2	f/2–22	Dec 1979	10/8	0.3 m (1.0 ft) (0.17×)	52	63×46 mm (2.5×1.8 in)	245 g (8.6 oz)	
35	TS 35mm f/2.8 S.S.C.	f/2.8–22	Mar 1973	9/8	0.3 m (1.0 ft) (0.192×)	58	67×74.5 mm (2.6×2.9 in)	550 g (19 oz)	
35	FD 35mm f/3.5	f/3.5–22	Mar 1971	6/6	0.4 m (1.3 ft) (0.115×)	55	64×49 mm (2.5×1.9 in)	325 g (11.5 oz)	
35	FD 35mm f/3.5 S.C. (I)	f/3.5–22	Mar 1973	6/6	0.4 m (1.3 ft) (0.115×)	55	64×49 mm (2.5×1.9 in)	295 g (10.4 oz)	
35	FD 35mm f/3.5 S.C. (II)	f/3.5–22	Mar 1975	6/6	0.4 m (1.3 ft) (0.115×)	55	64.3×49 mm (2.5×1.9 in)	236 g (8.3 oz)	
35	FD 35mm f/3.5 S.C. (III)	f/3.5–22	Jul 1977	6/6	0.4 m (1.3 ft) (0.115×)	55	65×47 mm (2.6×1.9 in)	236 g (8.3 oz)	
Normal lenses
50	New FD 50mm f/1.2	f/1.2–16	Dec 1980	7/6	0.5 m (1.6 ft) (0.13×)	52	65.3×45.6 mm (2.6×1.8 in)	315 g (11.1 oz)	
50	New FD 50mm f/1.2L	f/1.2–16	Oct 1980	8/6	0.5 m (1.6 ft) (0.13×)	52	65.3×50.5 mm (2.6×2.0 in)	380 g (13 oz)	
50	FD 50mm f/1.4	f/1.4–16	Mar 1971	7/6	0.45 m (1.5 ft) (0.145×)	55	66×49 mm (2.6×1.9 in)	370 g (13 oz)	
50	FD 50mm f/1.4 S.S.C. (I)	f/1.4–16	Mar 1973	7/6	0.45 m (1.5 ft) (0.145×)	55	67×49 mm (2.6×1.9 in)	350 g (12 oz)	
50	FD 50mm f/1.4 S.S.C. (II)	f/1.4–16	Jun 1973	7/6	0.45 m (1.5 ft) (0.145×)	55	65.3×49 mm (2.6×1.9 in)	305 g (10.8 oz)	
50	New FD 50mm f/1.4	f/1.4–22	Jun 1979	7/6	0.45 m (1.5 ft) (0.15×)	52	63×41 mm (2.5×1.6 in)	235 g (8.3 oz)	
50	FD 50mm f/1.8 (I)	f/1.8–16	Mar 1971	6/4	0.6 m (2.0 ft) (0.103×)	55	65×44.5 mm (2.6×1.8 in)	305 g (10.8 oz)	
50	FD 50mm f/1.8 (II)	f/1.8–16	Nov 1971	6/4	0.6 m (2.0 ft) (0.103×)	55	65×44.5 mm (2.6×1.8 in)	305 g (10.8 oz)	
50	FD 50mm f/1.8 S.C. (I)	f/1.8–16	Mar 1973	6/4	0.6 m (2.0 ft) (0.103×)	55	64×44.5 mm (2.5×1.8 in)	255 g (9.0 oz)	
50	FD 50mm f/1.8 S.C. (II)	f/1.8–16	Mar 1976	6/4	0.6 m (2.0 ft) (0.103×)	55	63×38.5 mm (2.5×1.5 in)	200 g (7.1 oz)	
50	New FD 50mm f/1.8	f/1.8–22	Jun 1979	6/4	0.6 m (2.0 ft) (0.1×)	52	63×35 mm (2.5×1.4 in)	170 g (6.0 oz)	
50	New FD 50mm f/2	f/2–16	Jul 1980	6/4	0.6 m (2.0 ft) (0.1×)	52	63×35 mm (2.5×1.4 in)	170 g (6.0 oz)	
50	FD M 50mm f/3.5 S.S.C.	f/3.5–22	Mar 1973	6/4	0.232 m (0.8 ft) (0.5×)	55	65.8×59.5 mm (2.6×2.3 in)	310 g (11 oz)	
50	New Macro FD 50mm f/3.5	f/3.5–32	Jun 1979	6/4	0.232 m (0.8 ft) (0.5×)	52	63×57 mm (2.5×2.2 in)	235 g (8.3 oz)	
55	FD 55mm f/1.2	f/1.2–16	Mar 1971	7/5	0.6 m (2.0 ft) (0.109×)	58	75.8×52.5 mm (3.0×2.1 in)	565 g (19.9 oz)	
55	FD 55mm f/1.2 AL	f/1.2–16	Mar 1971	8/6	0.6 m (2.0 ft) (0.11×)	58	75.8×55 mm (3.0×2.2 in)	605 g (21.3 oz)	
55	FD 55mm f/1.2 S.S.C.	f/1.2–16	Mar 1973	7/5	0.6 m (2.0 ft) (0.109×)	58	75.8×52.5 mm (3.0×2.1 in)	565 g (19.9 oz)	
55	FD 55mm f/1.2 S.S.C. AL	f/1.2–16	Mar 1973	8/6	0.6 m (2.0 ft) (0.11×)	58	75.8×55 mm (3.0×2.2 in)	575 g (20.3 oz)	
55	FD 55mm f/1.2 S.S.C. Aspherical	f/1.2–16	Mar 1975	8/6	0.6 m (2.0 ft) (0.11×)	58	75.8×55 mm (3.0×2.2 in)	575 g (20.3 oz)	
Telephoto lenses
85	FD 85mm f/1.2 Aspherical	f/1.2–16	Jan 1976	8/6	1 m (3.3 ft) (0.1×)	72	81×71 mm (3.2×2.8 in)	756 g (26.7 oz)	
85	New FD 85mm f/1.2L	f/1.2–16	Mar 1980	8/6	0.9 m (3.0 ft) (0.12×)	72	80.8×71 mm (3.2×2.8 in)	680 g (24 oz)	
85	FD 85mm f/1.8	f/1.8–16	Jan 1976	6/4	0.9 m (3.0 ft) (0.114×)	55	67×57 mm (2.6×2.2 in)	425 g (15.0 oz)	
85	New FD 85mm f/1.8	f/1.8–22	Jun 1979	6/4	0.85 m (2.8 ft) (0.12×)	52	63×53.5 mm (2.5×2.1 in)	345 g (12.2 oz)	
85	New FD 85mm f/2.8 Soft Focus	f/2.8–22	Feb 1983	6/4	0.8 m (2.6 ft) (0.12×)	58	70×70 mm (2.8×2.8 in)	400 g (14 oz)	
100	New FD 100mm f/2	f/2–32	Jan 1980	6/4	1 m (3.3 ft) (0.12×)	52	63×70 mm (2.5×2.8 in)	445 g (15.7 oz)	
100	FD 100mm f/2.8	f/2.8–22	Mar 1971	5/5	1 m (3.3 ft) (0.13×)	55	67×57 mm (2.6×2.2 in)	430 g (15 oz)	
100	FD 100mm f/2.8 S.S.C.	f/2.8–22	Mar 1973	5/5	1 m (3.3 ft) (0.13×)	55	67×57 mm (2.6×2.2 in)	360 g (13 oz)	
100	New FD 100mm f/2.8	f/2.8–32	Jun 1979	5/5	1 m (3.3 ft) (0.12×)	52	63×53.4 mm (2.5×2.1 in)	270 g (9.5 oz)	
100	FD M 100mm f/4 S.C.	f/4–32	Oct 1975	5/3	0.45 m (1.5 ft) (0.5×)	55	67×112 mm (2.6×4.4 in)	530 g (19 oz)	
100	New Macro FD 100mm f/4	f/4–32	Sep 1979	5/3	0.45 m (1.5 ft) (0.5×)	52	70.3×95 mm (2.8×3.7 in)	455 g (16.0 oz)	
135	New FD 135mm f/2	f/2–32	May 1980	6/5	1.3 m (4.3 ft) (0.13×)	72	78×90.4 mm (3.1×3.6 in)	670 g (24 oz)	
135	FD 135mm f/2.5	f/2.5–22	Mar 1971	6/5	1.5 m (4.9 ft) (0.14×)	58	69×91 mm (2.7×3.6 in)	670 g (24 oz)	
135	FD 135mm f/2.5 S.C.	f/2.5–22	Mar 1973	6/5	1.5 m (4.9 ft) (0.14×)	58	69×91 mm (2.7×3.6 in)	630 g (22 oz)	
135	New FD 135mm f/2.8	f/2.8–32	Jun 1979	6/5	1.3 m (4.3 ft) (0.13×)	52	63×78 mm (2.5×3.1 in)	395 g (13.9 oz)	
135	FD 135mm f/3.5	f/3.5–22	Jul 1970	4/3	1.5 m (4.9 ft) (0.098×)	55	66×83 mm (2.6×3.3 in)	480 g (17 oz)	
135	FD 135mm f/3.5 S.C. (I)	f/3.5–22	Mar 1973	4/3	1.5 m (4.9 ft) (0.098×)	55	66×83 mm (2.6×3.3 in)	465 g (16.4 oz)	
135	FD 135mm f/3.5 S.C. (II)	f/3.5–22	Nov 1976	4/4	1.5 m (4.9 ft) (0.098×)	55	66×85 mm (2.6×3.3 in)	385 g (13.6 oz)	
135	New FD 135mm f/3.5	f/3.5–32	Jun 1979	4/4	1.3 m (4.3 ft) (0.13×)	52	63×85 mm (2.5×3.3 in)	325 g (11.5 oz)	
200	New FD 200mm f/1.8L	f/1.8–22	Nov 1989	11/9	2.5 m (8.2 ft) (0.09×)	48 drop-in	130×208 mm (5.1×8.2 in)	2,800 g (6 lb 3 oz)	
200	FD 200mm f/2.8 S.S.C.	f/2.8–22	Mar 1975	5/5	1.8 m (5.9 ft) (0.15×)	72	78×140.5 mm (3.1×5.5 in)	700 g (25 oz)	
200	New FD 200mm f/2.8 (I)	f/2.8–32	Jun 1979	5/5	1.8 m (5.9 ft) (0.15×)	72	78×140.5 mm (3.1×5.5 in)	700 g (25 oz)	
200	New FD 200mm f/2.8 (II)	f/2.8–32	Oct 1982	7/6	1.5 m (4.9 ft)	72	81.2×134.2 mm (3.2×5.3 in)	735 g (25.9 oz)	
200	FD 200mm f/4	f/4–22	Mar 1971	6/5	2.5 m (8.2 ft) (0.1×)	55	67×133 mm (2.6×5.2 in)	725 g (25.6 oz)	
200	FD 200mm f/4 S.S.C.	f/4–22	Mar 1973	6/5	2.5 m (8.2 ft) (0.1×)	55	67×133 mm (2.6×5.2 in)	675 g (23.8 oz)	
200	New FD 200mm f/4	f/4–32	Jun 1979	7/6	1.5 m (4.9 ft) (0.15×)	52	63×121.5 mm (2.5×4.8 in)	440 g (16 oz)	
200	New Macro FD 200mm f/4	f/4–32	Apr 1981	9/6	0.58 m (1.9 ft) (1.0×)	58	68.8×182.4 mm (2.7×7.2 in)	830 g (29 oz)	
300	FD 300mm f/2.8 S.S.C. Fluorite	f/2.8–22	Oct 1975	6/5	3.5 m (11.5 ft) (0.1×)	special	112×230 mm (4.4×9.1 in)	1,900 g (4 lb 3 oz)	
300	New FD 300mm f/2.8L	f/2.8–22	Apr 1981	9/7	3 m (9.8 ft) (0.11×)	48 drop-in	127×245 mm (5.0×9.6 in)	2,310 g (5 lb 1 oz)	
300	FD 300mm f/4 S.S.C.	f/4–22	Jan 1978	6/6	3 m (9.8 ft) (0.11×)	34 rear	85×204 mm (3.3×8.0 in)	965 g (34.0 oz)	
300	FD 300mm f/4L	f/4–32	Dec 1978	7/7	3 m (9.8 ft) (0.11×)	34 rear	85×208 mm (3.3×8.2 in)	1,235 g (43.6 oz)	
300	New FD 300mm f/4	f/4–22	Jun 1979	6/6	3 m (9.8 ft) (0.11×)	34 rear	85×204 mm (3.3×8.0 in)	945 g (33.3 oz)	
300	New FD 300mm f/4L	f/4–32	May 1980	7/7	3 m (9.8 ft) (0.11×)	34 rear	85×207 mm (3.3×8.1 in)	1,060 g (37 oz)	
300	FD 300mm f/5.6	f/5.6–22	Mar 1971	6/5	4 m (13.1 ft) (0.09×)	58	70×173 mm (2.8×6.8 in)	1,155 g (40.7 oz)	
300	FD 300mm f/5.6 S.C.	f/5.6–22	Mar 1973	6/5	4 m (13.1 ft) (0.09×)	58	70×173 mm (2.8×6.8 in)	1,125 g (39.7 oz)	
300	FD 300mm f/5.6 S.S.C.	f/5.6–22	Mar 1977	6/5	3 m (9.8 ft) (0.125×)	55	64.5×198.3 mm (2.5×7.8 in)	685 g (24.2 oz)	
300	New FD 300mm f/5.6	f/5.6–32	Jun 1979	6/5	3 m (9.8 ft) (0.11×)	58	65×198.5 mm (2.6×7.8 in)	635 g (22.4 oz)	
Super telephoto lenses
400	New FD 400mm f/2.8L	f/2.8–32	Sep 1981	10/8	4 m (13.1 ft) (0.11×)	48 drop-in	166×348 mm (6.5×13.7 in)	5,350 g (11 lb 13 oz)	
400	FD 400mm f/4.5 S.S.C.	f/4.5–22	Oct 1975	6/5	4 m (13.1 ft) (0.135×)	special	94×282 mm (3.7×11.1 in)	1,300 g (46 oz)	
400	New FD 400mm f/4.5	f/4.5–32	Jul 1981	6/5	4 m (13.1 ft) (0.11×)	34 rear	102×287.5 mm (4.0×11.3 in)	1,270 g (45 oz)	
500	FD 500mm f/4.5L	f/4.5–32	May 1979	7/6	4 m (13.1 ft) (0.14×)	48 drop-in	127×395 mm (5.0×15.6 in)	2,950 g (6 lb 8 oz)	
500	New FD 500mm f/4.5L	f/4.5–32	Dec 1981	7/6	5 m (16.4 ft) (0.14×)	48 drop-in	128×395 mm (5.0×15.6 in)	2,610 g (5 lb 12 oz)	
500	Reflex 500mm f/8 S.S.C.	f/8	Aug 1978	6/3	4 m (13.1 ft) (0.14×)	34 rear	90×146 mm (3.5×5.7 in)	740 g (26 oz)	
500	New Reflex 500mm f/8	f/8	Mar 1980	6/3	4 m (13.1 ft) (0.14×)	34 rear	90×146 mm (3.5×5.7 in)	705 g (24.9 oz)	
600	FD 600mm f/4.5 S.S.C.	f/4.5–22	Jul 1976	6/5	8 m (26.2 ft) (0.079×)	48 drop-in	149×455 mm (5.9×17.9 in)	4,300 g (9 lb 8 oz)	
600	New FD 600mm f/4.5	f/4.5–32	Jan 1981	6/5	8 m (26.2 ft) (0.079×)	48 drop-in	154×462 mm (6.1×18.2 in)	3,750 g (8 lb 4 oz)	
800	FD 800mm f/5.6 S.S.C.	f/5.6–22	Jul 1976	6/5	14 m (45.9 ft) (0.057×)	48 drop-in	149×567 mm (5.9×22.3 in)	4,300 g (9 lb 8 oz)	
800	FD 800mm f/5.6L	f/5.6–22	Dec 1979	7/6	14 m (45.9 ft) (0.057×)	48 drop-in	149×577 mm (5.9×22.7 in)	4,600 g (10 lb 2 oz)	
800	New FD 800mm f/5.6L	f/5.6–32	Jan 1981	7/6	14 m (45.9 ft) (0.057×)	48 drop-in	154×577 mm (6.1×22.7 in)	4,230 g (9 lb 5 oz)	
Wide angle zoom lenses
20–35	New FD 20–35mm f/3.5L	f/3.5–22	Apr 1984	11/11	0.5 m (1.6 ft) (0.083×)	72	76.5×84.2 mm (3.0×3.3 in)	470 g (17 oz)	
24–35	FD 24–35mm f/3.5 Aspherical	f/3.5–22	Feb 1978	12/9	0.4 m (1.3 ft) (0.11×)	72	76×86.3 mm (3.0×3.4 in)	515 g (18.2 oz)	
24–35	New FD 24–35mm f/3.5L	f/3.5–22	Dec 1979	12/9	0.4 m (1.3 ft) (0.11×)	72	76.5×86.6 mm (3.0×3.4 in)	495 g (17.5 oz)	
Wide to normal/telephoto zoom lenses
28–50	FD 28–50mm f/3.5 S.S.C.	f/3.5–22	Jul 1976	10/9	1 m (3.3 ft) (0.3×)	58	69×105 mm (2.7×4.1 in)	470 g (17 oz)	
28–50	New FD 28–50mm f/3.5	f/3.5–22	Sep 1979	10/9	1 m (3.3 ft) (0.05×)	58	69×99.5 mm (2.7×3.9 in)	470 g (17 oz)	
28–55	New FD 28–55mm f/3.5–4.5	f/3.5–4.5 — 22	Dec 1983	10/10	0.4 m (1.3 ft) (0.157×)	52	63×60.9 mm (2.5×2.4 in)	220 g (7.8 oz)	
28–85	New FD 28–85mm f/4	f/4–22	Nov 1985	13/11	0.5 m (1.6 ft) (0.101×)	72	76.5×104.1 mm (3.0×4.1 in)	485 g (17.1 oz)	
35–70	FD 35–70mm f/3.5 S.S.C.	f/3.5–22	Jul 1976	10/10	0.3 m (1.0 ft) (0.087×)	58	69×120 mm (2.7×4.7 in)	575 g (20.3 oz)	
35–70	New FD 35–70mm f/3.5	f/3.5–22	Sep 1979	10/10	1 m (3.3 ft) (0.07×)	58	69×120 mm (2.7×4.7 in)	545 g (19.2 oz)	
35–70	New FD 35–70mm f/3.5–4.5	f/3.5–4.5 — 22	Mar 1983	9/8	0.5 m (1.6 ft) (0.15×)	52	63×60.9 mm (2.5×2.4 in)	200 g (7.1 oz)	
35–70	New FD 35–70mm f/4	f/4–22	Sep 1979	8/8	0.5 m (1.6 ft) (0.15×)	52	63×84.5 mm (2.5×3.3 in)	315 g (11.1 oz)	
35–70	New FD 35–70mm f/4 AF	f/4–22	May 1981	8/8	0.5 m (1.6 ft) (0.15×)	52	85×99.5 mm (3.3×3.9 in)	604 g (21.3 oz)	
35–105	New FD 35–105mm f/3.5	f/3.5–22	Apr 1981	15/13	1.5 m (4.9 ft) (0.079×)	72	76.5×108.4 mm (3.0×4.3 in)	600 g (21 oz)	
35–105	New FD 35–105mm f/3.5–4.5	f/3.5–4.5 — 22	Dec 1985	14/11	1.2 m (3.9 ft) (0.103×)	58	66.8×83.7 mm (2.6×3.3 in)	345 g (12.2 oz)	
Normal & telephoto zoom lenses
50–135	New FD 50–135mm f/3.5	f/3.5–22	Dec 1981	16/12	1.5 m (4.9 ft) (0.11×)	58	71.4×125.4 mm (2.8×4.9 in)	720 g (25 oz)	
50–300	New FD 50–300mm f/4.5L	f/4.5–32	Jul 1982	16/13	2.53 m (8.3 ft) (0.144×)	34 rear	104×250 mm (4.1×9.8 in)	1,800 g (63 oz)	
70–150	New FD 70–150mm f/4.5	f/4.5–32	Jun 1979	12/9	1.5 m (4.9 ft) (0.13×)	52	63×132 mm (2.5×5.2 in)	530 g (19 oz)	
70–210	New FD 70–210mm f/4	f/4–32	Oct 1980	12/9	1.2 m (3.9 ft) (0.23×)	58	72.2×151 mm (2.8×5.9 in)	705 g (24.9 oz)	
75–200	New FD 75–200mm f/4.5	f/4.5–32	Jul 1984	11/8	1.8 m (5.9 ft) (0.134×)	52	71×123 mm (2.8×4.8 in)	510 g (18 oz)	
80–200	FD 80–200mm f/4 S.S.C.	f/4–32	Oct 1976	15/11	1 m (3.3 ft) (0.29×)	55	68×161 mm (2.7×6.3 in)	750 g (26 oz)	
80–200	New FD 80–200mm f/4	f/4–32	Jun 1979	15/11	1 m (3.3 ft) (0.29×)	58	67.9×161 mm (2.7×6.3 in)	765 g (27.0 oz)	
80–200	New FD 80–200mm f/4L	f/4–32	Nov 1985	14/12	0.95 m (3.1 ft) (0.22×)	58	72.8×153 mm (2.9×6.0 in)	675 g (23.8 oz)	
85–300	FD 85–300mm f/4.5 S.S.C.	f/4.5–22	Apr 1974	15/11	2.5 m (8.2 ft) (0.147×)	Series IX	94×243.5 mm (3.7×9.6 in)	1,800 g (63 oz)	
85–300	New FD 85–300mm f/4.5	f/4.5–32	Jan 1981	15/11	2.5 m (8.2 ft) (0.147×)	Series IX	94×246.8 mm (3.7×9.7 in)	1,630 g (57 oz)	
100–200	FD 100–200mm f/5.6	f/5.6–22	May 1971	8/5	2.5 m (8.2 ft) (0.1×)	55	66×174 mm (2.6×6.9 in)	820 g (29 oz)	
100–200	FD 100–200mm f/5.6 S.C.	f/5.6–22	Mar 1973	8/5	2.5 m (8.2 ft) (0.1×)	55	66×173 mm (2.6×6.8 in)	765 g (27.0 oz)	
100–200	New FD 100–200mm f/5.6	f/5.6–32	Jun 1979	8/5	2.5 m (8.2 ft) (0.1×)	52	63×167 mm (2.5×6.6 in)	610 g (22 oz)	
100–300	New FD 100–300mm f/5.6	f/5.6–32	May 1980	14/9	2 m (6.6 ft) (0.18×)	58	72.2×207 mm (2.8×8.1 in)	835 g (29.5 oz)	
100–300	New FD 100–300mm f/5.6L	f/5.6–32	Nov 1985	15/11	1 m (3.3 ft) (0.3×)	58	71.4×172 mm (2.8×6.8 in)	710 g (25 oz)	
Super telephoto zoom lenses
150–600	New FD 150–600mm f/5.6L	f/5.6–32	Aug 1982	19/15	12 m (39.4 ft) (0.26×)	34 rear	123×468 mm (4.8×18.4 in)	4,350 g (9 lb 9 oz)	

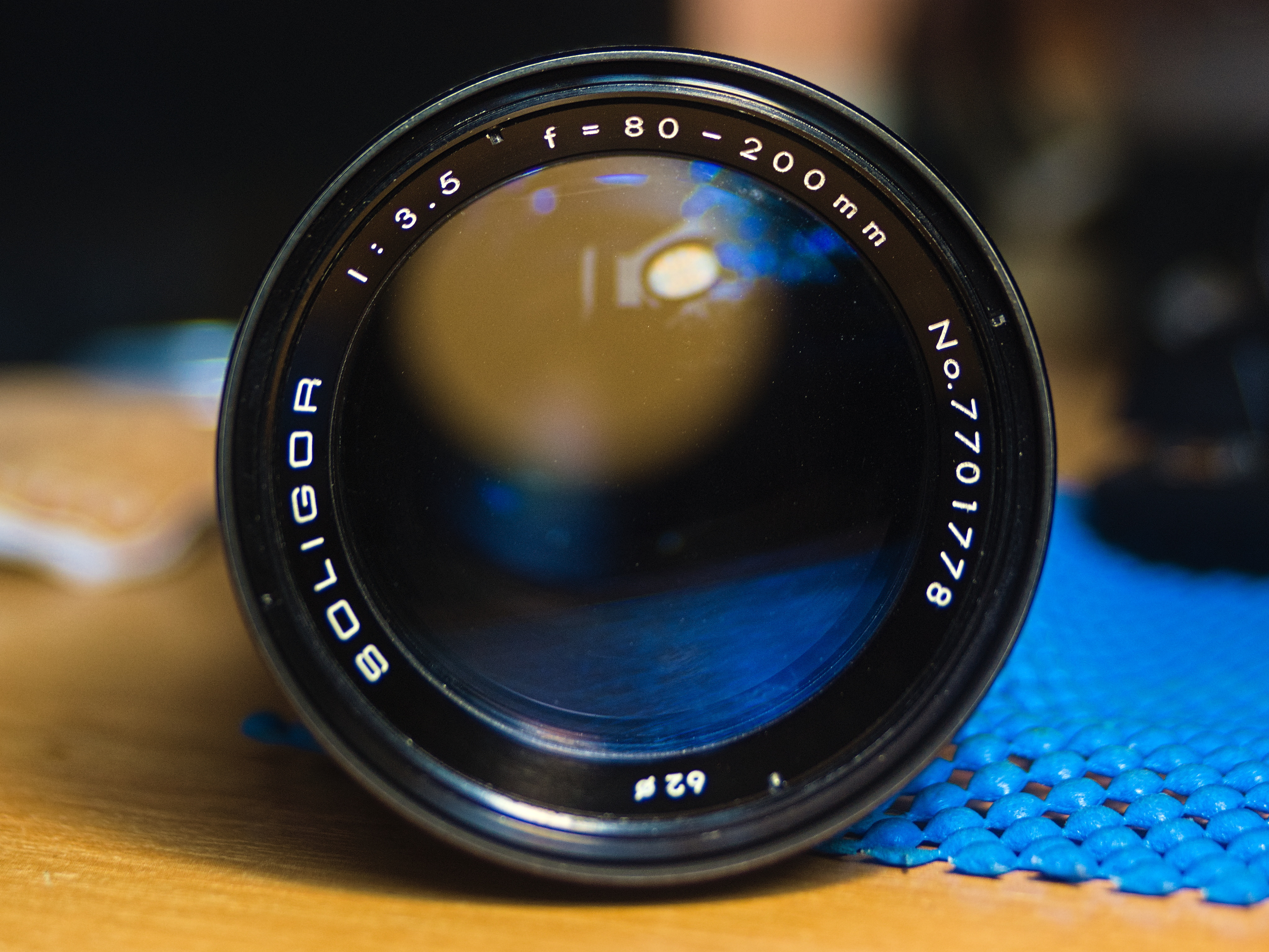
Soligor 80 - 200 mm f/3.5

Special limited production

- 800mm f/3.8 Mirror
- 2000mm f/11 Mirror
- 5200mm f/14 Mirror
- In addition, a 1200mm f/5.6L lens was developed and used at the 1984 Summer Olympics, but never marketed as an FD lens. All copies of that lens were shipped back to Canon headquarters in Japan, converted to the EF mount, and sold as EF lenses.

Macrophoto lenses

- Macrophoto Lens 20mm f/2.8
- Macrophoto Lens 35mm f/2.8

In addition to first-party lenses sold by Canon and listed here, numerous OEM and third-party manufacturers built lenses with Canon FD mount, including Cosina, Kiron, Sigma, Soligor, Tamron, Tokina, and Vivitar.
