= Canon FD 35mm f/2 =

The Canon FD 35mm f/2.0 lens was manufactured by Canon for the FD lens mount. It was sold in several variations after it was introduced in 1971, and was the fastest Canon lens in the 35mm focal length before the debut of the EF 35mm f1.4.

== Versions ==
Canon FD 35mm f/2.0 lenses
Lens Spec		FD 35mm f/2 (I) "chrome nose"	FD 35mm f/2 (II) "chrome nose"	FD 35mm f/2 (III) "black nose"	FD 35mm f/2 S.S.C. (I) "black nose"	FD 35mm f/2 S.S.C. (II) "black nose"	New FD 35mm f/2
Date		Mar 1971	?	Jan 1973	Mar 1973	Jan 1976	Dec 1979
Focal length		35 mm					
Aperture		f/2–16				f/2–22	
Construction	Elements	9					10
Construction	Groups	8					
Min. focus		0.3 m (1 ft 0 in) (0.194×)					0.3 m (1 ft 0 in) (0.17×)
Dimensions	Φ×L	64×60 mm (2.5×2.4 in)	67×60 mm (2.6×2.4 in)			65.3×60 mm (2.6×2.4 in)	63×46 mm (2.5×1.8 in)
Dimensions	Wgt	420 g (15 oz)			370 g (13 oz)	345 g (12.2 oz)	245 g (8.6 oz)
Dimensions	Filter (mm)	55					52

=== Breech-Lock Mount (FD) ===
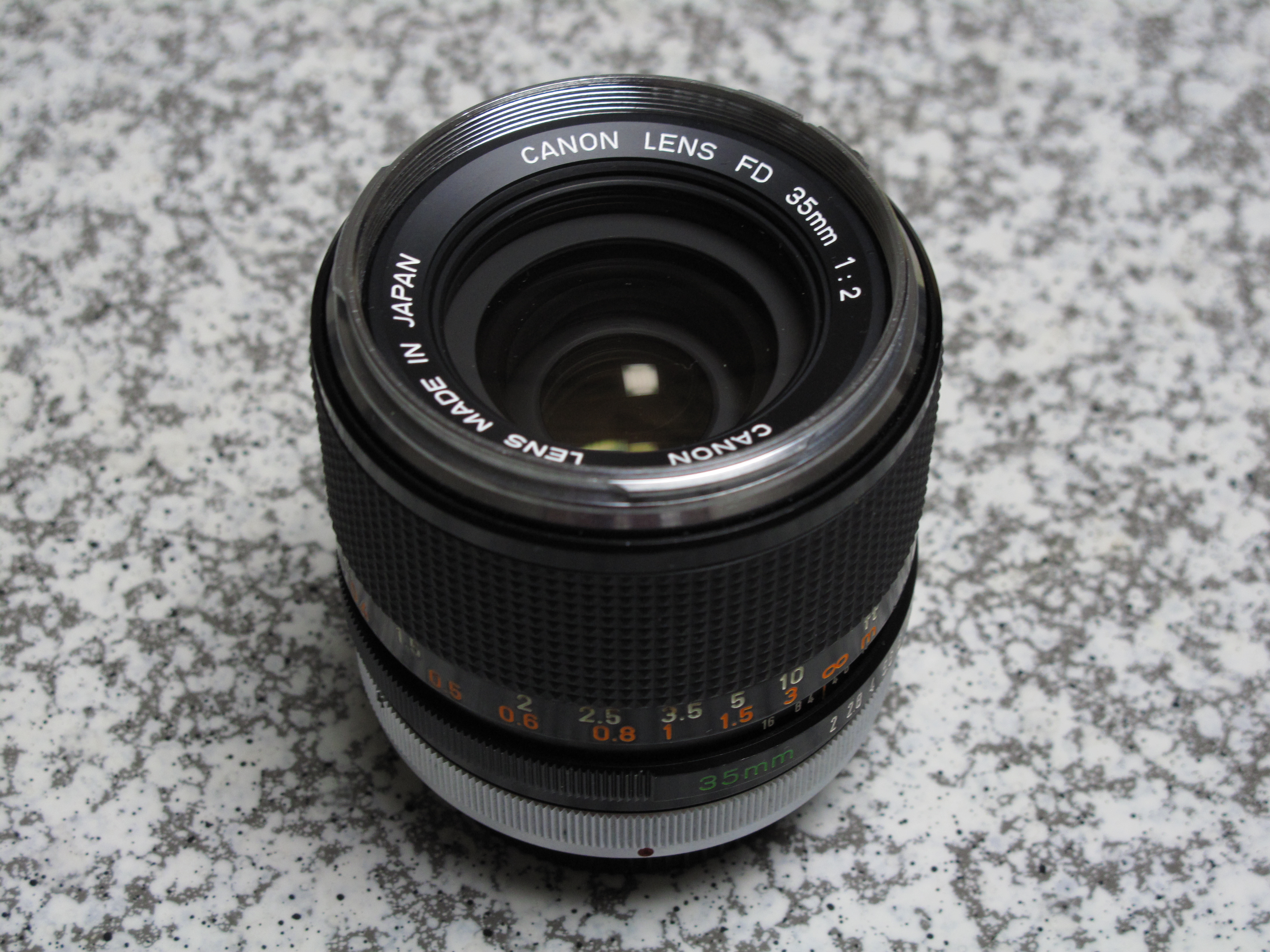
"chrome nose" variant with concave front lens

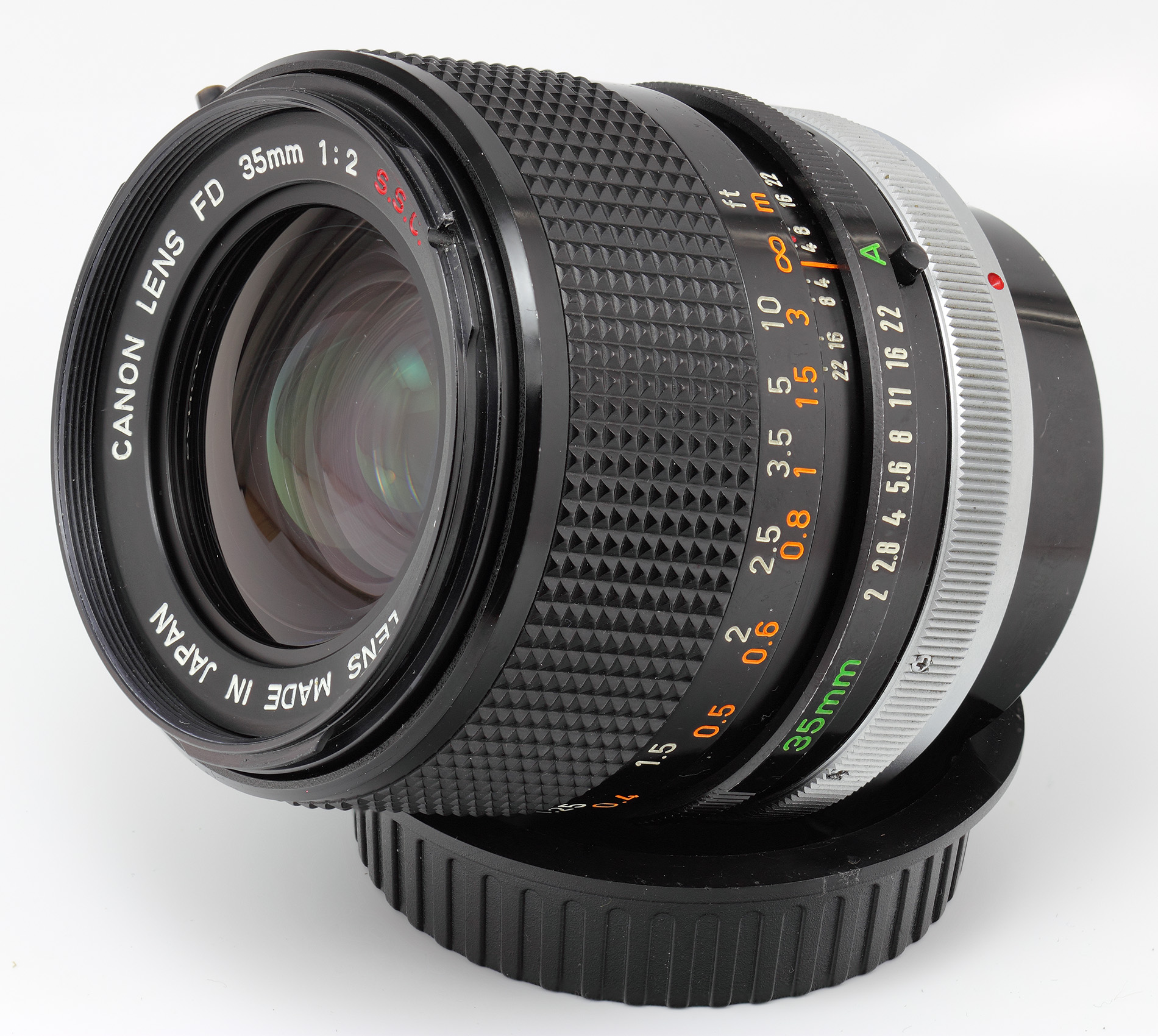
"black nose" S.S.C. variant with convex front lens

- Black Bayonet Hood Mount, Concave Front Element, Min Aperture f/16
- Black Bayonet Hood Mount, Concave Front Element, SSC Coating, Min Aperture f/16
- Chrome Bayonet Hood Mount, Concave Front Element, SSC Coating, Min Aperture f/16
- Chrome Bayonet Hood Mount, Convex Front Element, SSC Coating, Min Aperture f/22

=== Bayonet Mount (nFD) ===
With a 10-element, 8-group construction, the new FD 35mm f/2 was approximately 25 percent shorter and 29 percent lighter than the earlier FD design.

- Black, Convex Front Element, Standard New FD Coating, Min Aperture f/22

== Thorium ==
The first four versions of the lens, identified by a concave front glass element, contain thoriated glass lens elements, which have been doped with the radioactive compound thorium dioxide. This has created concerns that these lenses may not be safe for regular use (for your own evaluation, see measurements and references in the above source lummukka.com).

On top of health risks any user must evaluate for themselves, the thoriated glass elements develop a yellow tint over time, reducing transmission and interfering with neutral color reproduction. The internet holds tips involving ultraviolet light to at least temporarily remove the tint.

A legend has been prevailing whereby these Thorium (Old FD) lenses were sharper side-to-side and at all apertures than the subsequent New FD version. Believers claim this to be due to the properties of Thorium dioxide glass with its enhanced refractive indices. However, direct comparisons have revealed that advances in optical design and lens coating had eliminated any shortcomings by the time the (non-radioactive) New FD version arrived. Compare and.
