= Canon FD 200 mm lens =

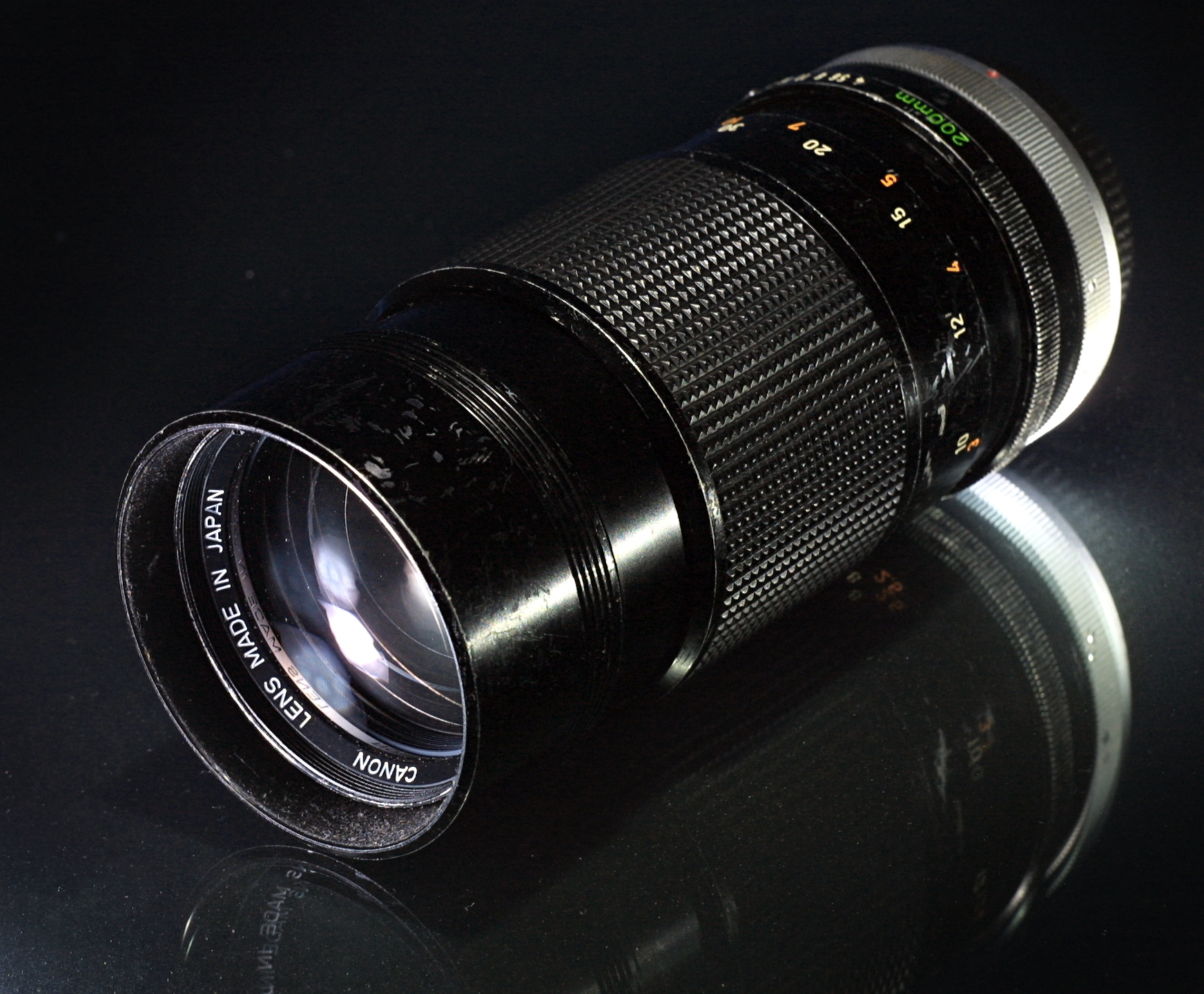
A 200 mm f/4.0 S.S.C.; this variant of the FD 200 mm lens was introduced in 1973.

Eight designs of Canon FD 200 mm lens were produced for the Canon FD lens mount. These spanned two generations (FD and New FD) and varied by aperture and macro ability. These photographic lenses were:

== Canon FD ==
- 200 mm f/2.8 S.S.C.: This lens, introduced in 1975, was identical to the first version of the New FD 200 mm f/2.8 except for the mounting hardware.
- 200 mm f/4.0: Introduced in 1971, this early version did not have Super Spectra Coating.
- 200 mm f/4.0 S.S.C.: introduced in 1973, this replaced the original, Spectra Coated version of this lens; as well as improved coating, the weight was reduced by 50 g, with dimensions unchanged. This lens had a built-in lens hood.

== Canon New FD ==
The New FD range changed the method by which the lens locked to the lens mount; instead of the silver locking ring at the base rotating while the rest of the lens remained still, the whole lens barrel rotated to lock the lens, even though the actual mating surfaces of the breech-lock mount remained stationary in respect to each other. This made the lenses attach more like the bayonet-lock mounts of other brands, and did away with the criticism that Canon lenses were more slow and fiddly to mount.

All New FD lenses were Super Spectra Coated, and thus the distinguishing nomenclature was no longer needed.

- 200 mm f/1.8 L: This was Canon's final FD lens, introduced in November 1989, a year after its autofocus Canon EF equivalent, the EF 200 mm f/1.8 L, due to demand from photographers yet to switch from the FD to the EOS system.
- 200 mm f/2.8: This lens was a New FD updating of the previous 200 mm f/2.8 lens, replacing the locking ring of the old FD system with the rotating barrel locking mechanism of the New FD series but otherwise little updated.
- 200 mm f/2.8 II: The second revision of the New FD 200 mm f/2.8 adopted a rear focusing system, in which only the rear group of the lens moves to adjust focus, meaning that the overall length of the lens does not change and focusing is easier. The number of optical elements was increased from 5 elements in 5 groups, to 7 elements in 6 groups; the size and weight increased, and the close focusing was improved.
- 200 mm f/2.8 III: The very last version was changed to an internal focusing system.
- 200 mm f/4.0: Completely reworked from the old FD lens, this new lens was the smallest and lightest FD 200 mm lens by a substantial margin. Like the newer version of the 200 mm f/2.8, the f/4 is a rear-focusing design that does not extend or retract during focusing. A built-in lens hood was a permanent fixture on the end of the lens barrel.
- 200 mm f/4.0 Macro: The longest of the three macro lenses in the FD system, the 200 mm f/4 Macro achieves a magnification of 1:1 (life size) at its closest focusing distance of 0.58 m (1.9 feet). The other Canon FD macro lenses achieve only a 1:2 (half life size) magnification without extension tubes and require the lens to be closer to the subject; on the other hand, the 200 mm's shallower depth of field at equivalent aperture settings can be limiting.

== Specifications ==
	FD			New FD				
Attribute	f/2.8 S.S.C	f/4	f/4 S.S.C.	f/1.8 L	f/2.8	f/2.8 II	f/4	f/4 Macro
Super Spectra Coating	Yes Yes	No No	Yes Yes					
L-Series	No No			Yes Yes	No No			
Macro	No No							Yes Yes
Tripod mount	No No			Yes Yes	No No			Yes Yes
Maximum aperture	2.8	4		1.8	2.8		4	
Minimum aperture	22				32			
Weight	700 g	725 g	675 g	2,800 g	700 g	735 g	440 g	830 g
Maximum diameter	78 mm	67 mm		130 mm	78 mm	81.2 mm	63 mm	68.8 mm
Length	140.5 mm	133 mm		208 mm	140.5 mm	134.2 mm	121.5 mm	182.4 mm
Filter diameter	72 mm	55 mm		48 mm (drop-in)	72 mm		52 mm	58 mm
Groups/elements	5/5	5/6		9/11	5/5	6/7	6/7	6/9
# of diaphragm blades	8							
Closest focusing distance	1.8 m	2.5 m			1.8 m	1.5 m		0.58 m
Release date	March 1975	March 1971	March 1973	November 1989	June 1979	October 1982	June 1979	April 1981
