= Canon FD 135 mm lens =

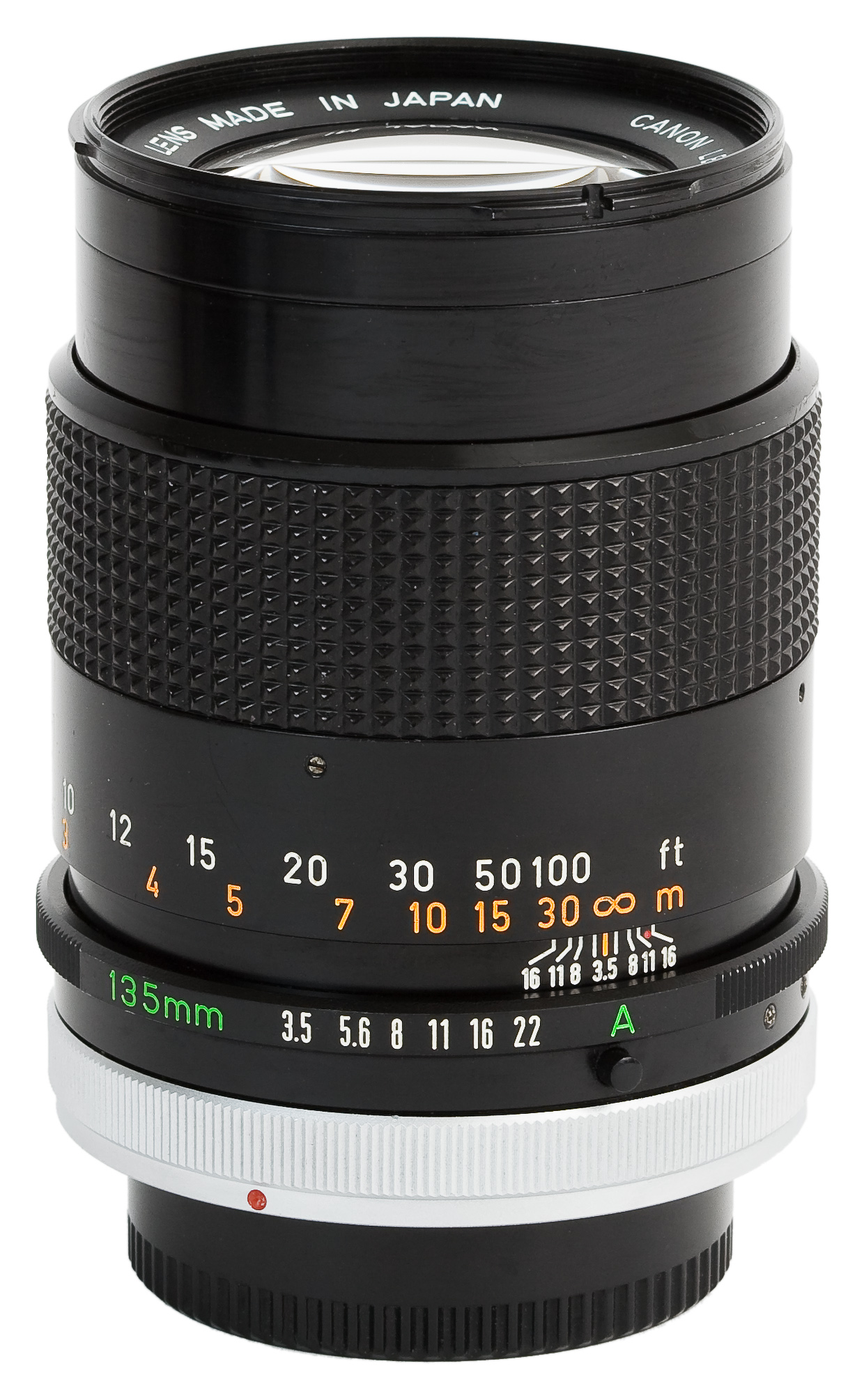
The Canon FD 135mm f/3.5 S.C. (I) lens

Several different models of Canon FD 135 mm lenses were produced by Canon Inc. for the Canon FD lens mount. Two were produced in the original "Old FD" style with a silver locking ring for the breech lock mount at the base, while three models were produced as "New FD" lenses where the entire lens barrel rotated to lock the lens in place.

== "Old" FD lenses ==
- 135 mm f/2.5: introduced in 1971 as one of the first lenses in the new Canon FD mount. Like all of the very early Canon FD lenses, it does not indicate the type of coating on the front lens ring. All lenses from 1971 (indeed, from the very early 1950s forward) were coated in one form or another.
- 135 mm f/2.5 S.C.: The marking for Spectra Coating (SC) was added in 1973.
- 135 mm f/3.5:
- 135 mm f/3.5 S.C. (I):
- 135 mm f/3.5 S.C. (II):

== New FD lenses ==
- 135 mm f/2.0
- 135 mm f/2.8
- 135 mm f/3.5

== Specifications ==
| | FD | | | | | New FD | | |
| Attribute | f/2.5 | f/2.5 S.C. | f/3.5 | f/3.5 S.C. (I) | f/3.5 S.C. (II) | f/2 | f/2.8 | f/3.5 |
|---|---|---|---|---|---|---|---|---|
| Coating | S.C.(unmarked) | S.C. | S.C.(unmarked) | S.C. | S.C. | S.S.C. | S.S.C. | S.S.C. |
| Maximum aperture | 2.5 | 2.5 | 3.5 | 3.5 | 3.5 | 2 | 2.8 | 3.5 |
| Minimum aperture | 22 | 22 | 22 | 22 | 22 | 32 | 32 | 32 |
| Weight | 670 g | 630 g | 480 g | 465 g | 385 g | 670 g | 395 g | 325 g |
| Length | 91 mm | 91 mm | 83 mm | 83 mm | 85 mm | 90.4 mm | 78 mm | 85 mm |
| Maximum diameter | 69 mm | 69 mm | 66 mm | 66 mm | 66 mm | 78 mm | 63 mm | 63 mm |
| Filter diameter | 58 mm | 58 mm | 55 mm | 55 mm | 55 mm | 72 mm | 52 mm | 52 mm |
| Groups/Elements | 5/6 | 5/6 | 3/4 | 3/4 | 4/4 | 5/6 | 5/6 | 4/4 |
| # of diaphragm blades | 8 | 8 | 8 | 8 | 6 | 8 | 8 | 6 |
| Closest focusing distance | 1.5 m | 1.5 m | 1.5 m | 1.5 m | 1.5 m | 1.3 m | 1.3 m | 1.3 m |
| Release date | March 1971 | March 1973 | July 1970 | March 1973 | November 1976 | May 1980 | June 1979 | June 1979 |
