= Canon FD 55mm f/1.2 AL =

FD 55mm ƒ/1.2 AL
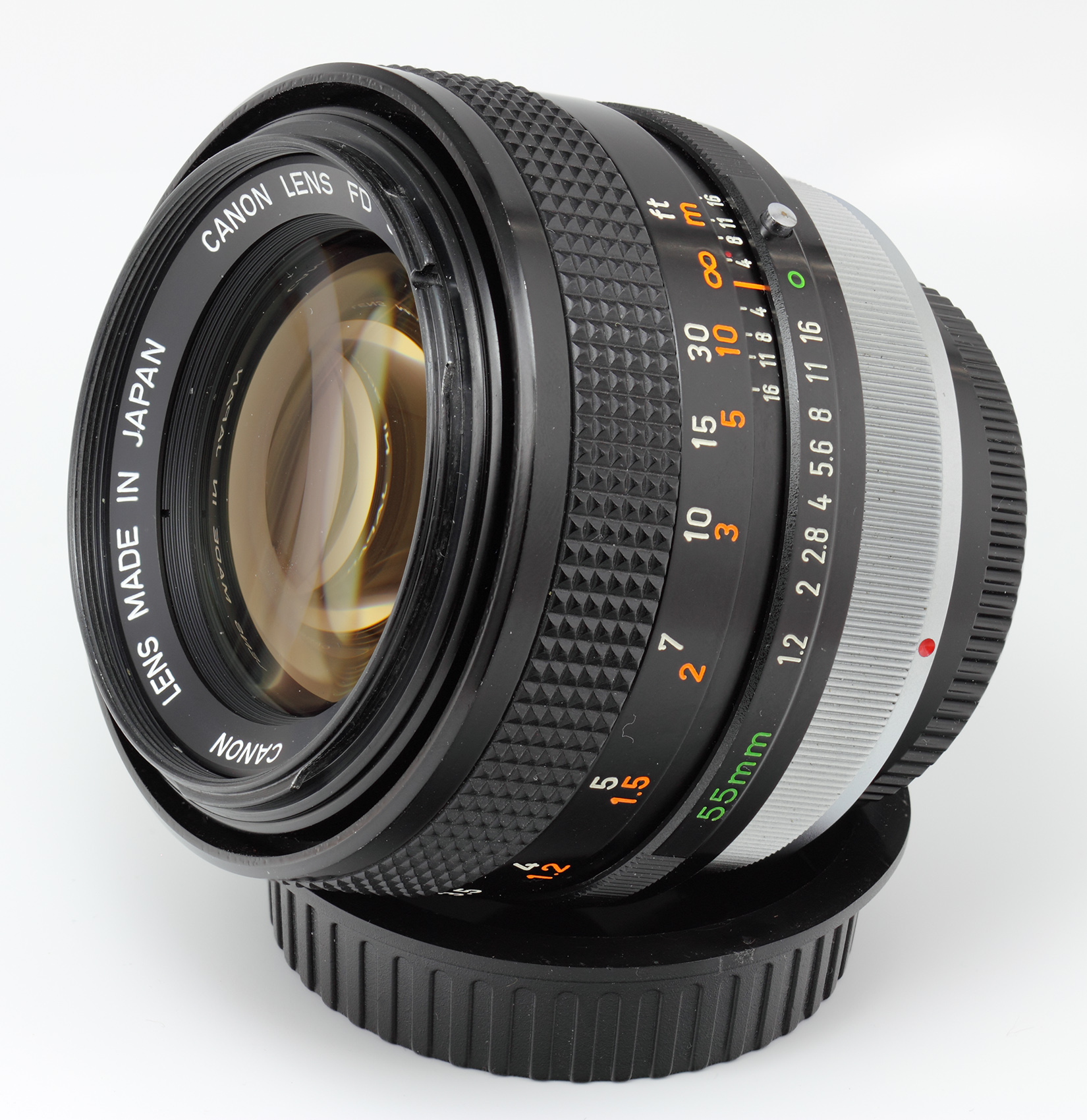
- Maker: Canon

Technical data
- Focal length: 55 mm
- Aperture (max/min): ƒ/1.2 – ƒ/16
- Close focus distance: 0.6 m (24 in)
- Max. magnification: 0.11
- Diaphragm blades: 8
- Construction: 8 elements in 6 groups

Physical
- Max. length: 55 mm (2.2 in)
- Diameter: 75.8 mm (2.98 in)
- Weight: 605 g (21.3 oz)
- Filter diameter: 58 mm

History
- Introduction: March 1971
- Discontinuation: 1980

The Canon FD 55mm ƒ/1.2 AL is a camera lens made by Canon, first introduced alongside the Canon F-1 single-lens reflex camera in March 1971. It was the first lens for any 35mm SLR system to incorporate an aspherical element. The lens was manufactured until 1980.

== Design ==
Canon FD 55mm ƒ1.2 AL element diagram

The FD 55mm ƒ/1.2 AL uses a variation of the double-Gauss lens design, in which the positive meniscus element of the front Gauss pair is aspherical. In total, the lens has 8 elements in six groups: a front element, two Gauss pairs, and three additional rear elements.

== Variants ==
In March 1975, Canon introduced a version of the lens, known as the FD 55mm ƒ/1.2 S.S.C. Aspherical. Although, this version was the first to formally signify that it is multicoated, the original version without S.S.C. engraving has used this type of multicoating as well.

== Radioactivity ==
Like a number of other contemporary lenses, the Canon FD 55mm ƒ/1.2 AL incorporated thoriated glass, a kind of optical glass that is doped with thorium dioxide. The inclusion of this compound makes the glass radioactive.

Over time, thorium decay causes F-centers to form in the glass, resulting in an amber discoloration. The discoloration can be repaired by exposure to a source of ultraviolet radiation, such as direct sunlight.
