= Stopping down =

Photographic technique

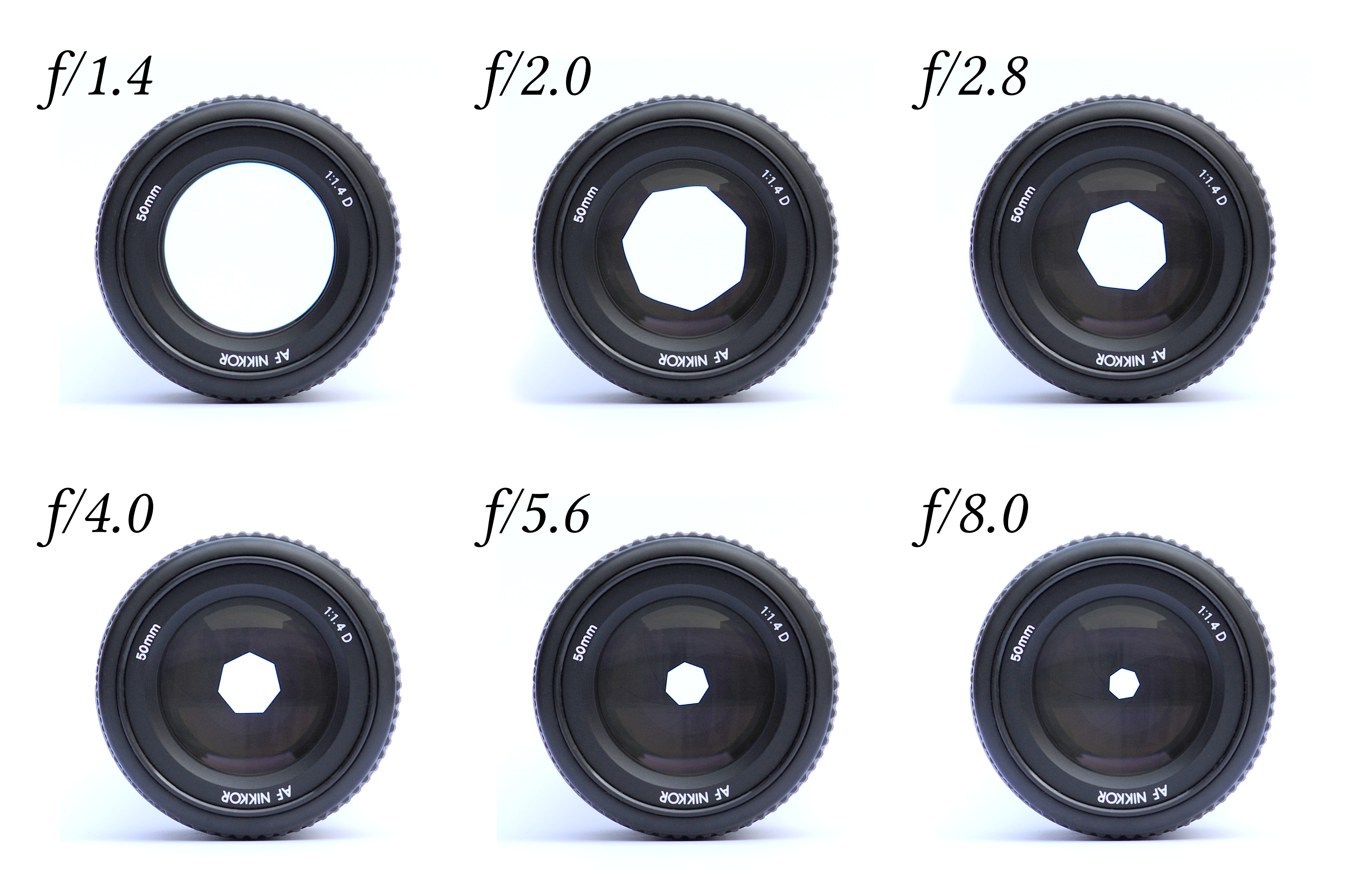
Increasing f-stop decreases the aperture of a lens

In photography, stopping down refers to increasing the numerical f-stop number (for example, going from f/2 to f/4), which decreases the size (diameter) of the aperture of a lens, resulting in reducing the amount of light entering the iris of a lens.

Reducing the aperture size increases the depth of field of the image. In the case of film cameras, this allows less light to reach the film plane – to achieve the same exposure after stopping down, it is necessary to compensate for the reduced light by either increasing the exposure time, or using a photographic film with a higher film speed (ISO). In the case of digital cameras, stopping down the aperture allows less light to reach the image sensor – to achieve the same exposure, it is necessary to compensate for the reduced light by either increasing the exposure time, or increasing the signal gain of the sensor by increasing the camera's ISO setting. Alternatively, more light can be added to the scene by increasing the amount of light illuminating the scene, such as by using or increasing the strength of electronic flash or other light sources.

As a lens is stopped down from its maximum (widest) aperture, most lens aberrations (spherical aberration, coma and astigmatism) are decreased, but lens diffraction increases. The effect is that for most lenses, the balance between the decreasing aberrations and the increasing diffraction effects of stopping down the lens means that lenses have an optimum aperture for best results, often about three stops closed down from maximum aperture, so for a lens with a maximum aperture of ƒ/2.8, ƒ/8 would be the optimum aperture.
