= Thoriated glass =

Glass material used in lenses

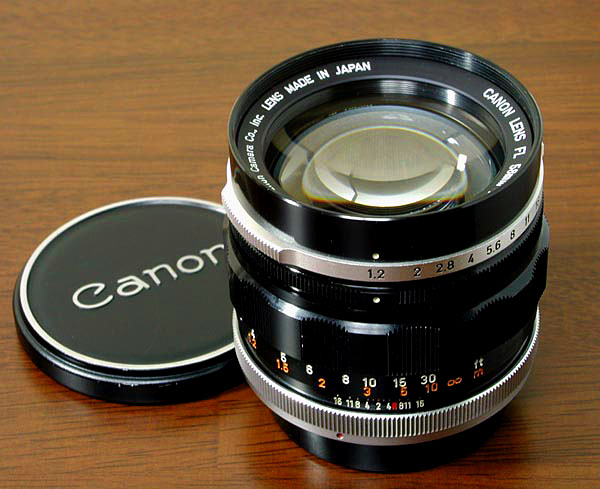
The Canon FL 58 mm f/1.2 uses thoriated glass elements

Thoriated glass is a glass material used in the manufacture of optical systems, specifically photographic lenses. It is useful to this process due to its high refractive index. Thoriated glass is radioactive due to the inclusion of thorium dioxide, oxide of radioactive element thorium. It has therefore been superseded as a material of choice by glass including lanthanum oxide. Thoriated glass can contain up to 30% by weight of thorium. The thoriated glass elements in lenses over time develop a brown tint reducing transmission and interfering with neutral color reproduction.

Many Kodak, Fuji and Asahi Takumar lenses that were produced prior to the 1970s are radioactive.

== Radiation browning ==
Over extended time periods, thoriated glass may develop significant discoloration. This is due to induced F-centers forming in the glass as the radioactive decay of the thorium progresses. The formation of F-centers is due to the ionizing effect of the high energy thorium decay products. This process can potentially be reversed by annealing the glass or exposing it to light.
