= R-mount =

R-mount may refer to:

- Canon R lens mount, used on Canon SLR cameras produced from 1959 to 1964
- Leica R lens mount, used on Leica R-series SLR cameras produced from 1976 to 2009

== See also ==
- Canon RF mount, used on Canon's EOS R mirrorless camera introduced in 2018
