= Canon Canonflex =

1959 35mm single-lens reflex camera

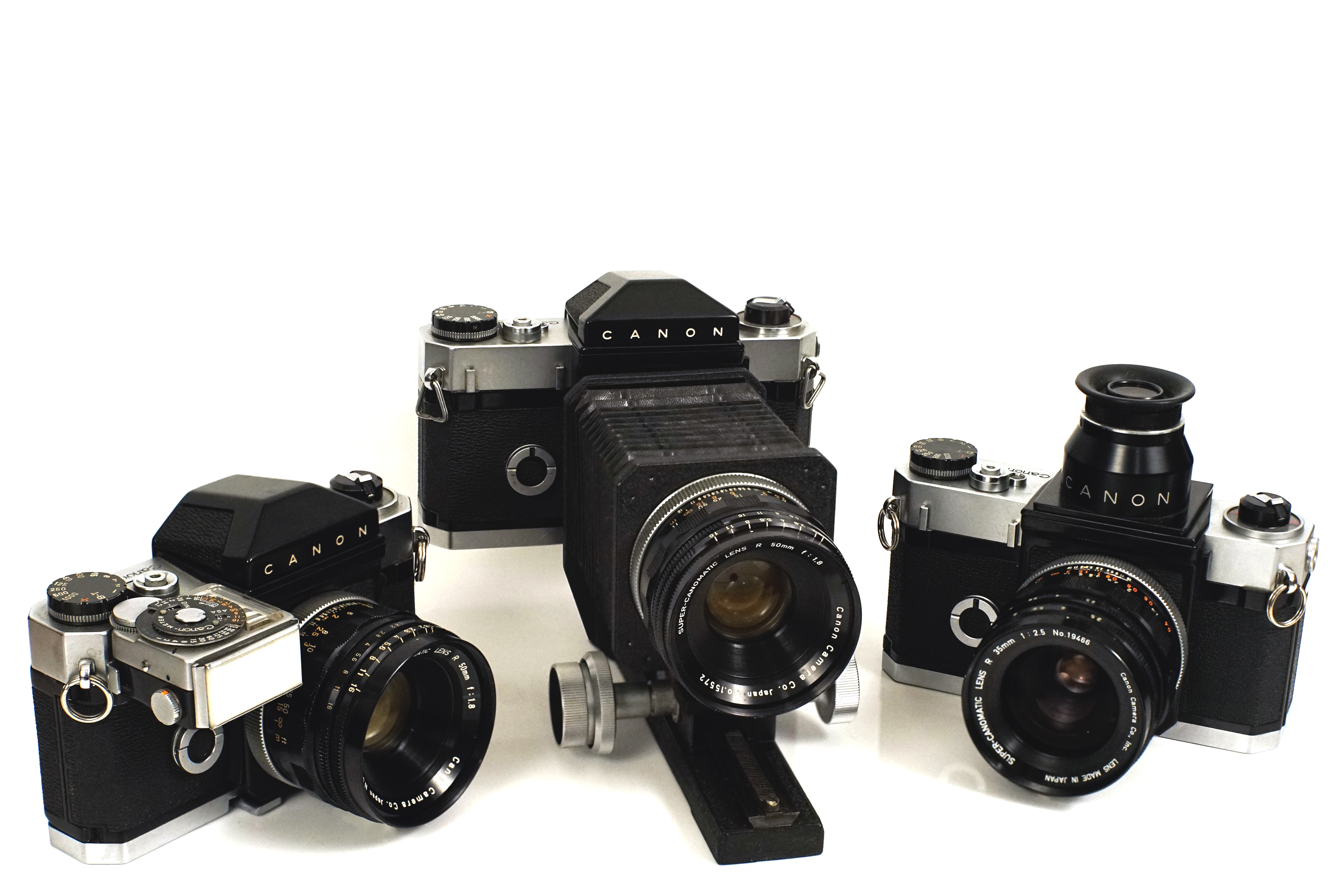
- Canonflex cameras with accessories.

Overview
- Maker: Canon Inc.
- Type: Single-lens reflex
- Production: 1959 - 1960

Lens
- Lens mount: R mount

Sensor/medium
- Film format: 35mm
- Film size: 36 mm x 24 mm

Shutter
- Shutter: Two-axis horizontal-travel focal-plane shutter with cloth curtains
- Shutter speed range: 1s - 1/1000s

Viewfinder
- Viewfinder: Interchangeable eye-level pentaprism
- Viewfinder magnification: 0.9x

General
- Dimensions: 145×100×49 mm (5.7×3.9×1.9 in)
- Weight: 940 g (33 oz)
- Made in: Japan

Chronology
- Successor: Canon Canonflex R2000

The Canonflex is a Canon 35 mm film single-lens reflex (SLR) camera introduced in May 1959 as Canon's first SLR. Its standard lens is the Canon Camera Co. Super-Canomatic R 50mm lens f/1.8. The camera was in production for one year before it was replaced by the Canonflex R2000 in 1960.

== History ==
By the 1950s, the Japanese camera industry had turned their interest towards the 35 mm SLR camera, which to that point had been exclusively manufactured in Europe, and in particular in Dresden, Germany. The first Japanese 35 mm SLR camera was Asahiflex, soon followed by several manufacturers. The Miranda T was launched in 1955. In 1958, Minolta and Topcon followed, while Nikon presented their Nikon F in 1959, by that time a supplier of rangefinder cameras based on the Contax concept. Canon had established itself as a 35 mm rangefinder camera manufacturer, featuring a wide variety of camera models and lenses using the Leica 39mm standard lens mount.

Upon release, the Canonflex was priced at ¥59,500 (1959) (equivalent to ¥378,531.98 or US$2,500.77 in 2024), which included the R50mm f/1.8 lens.

== The first Canon SLR camera ==
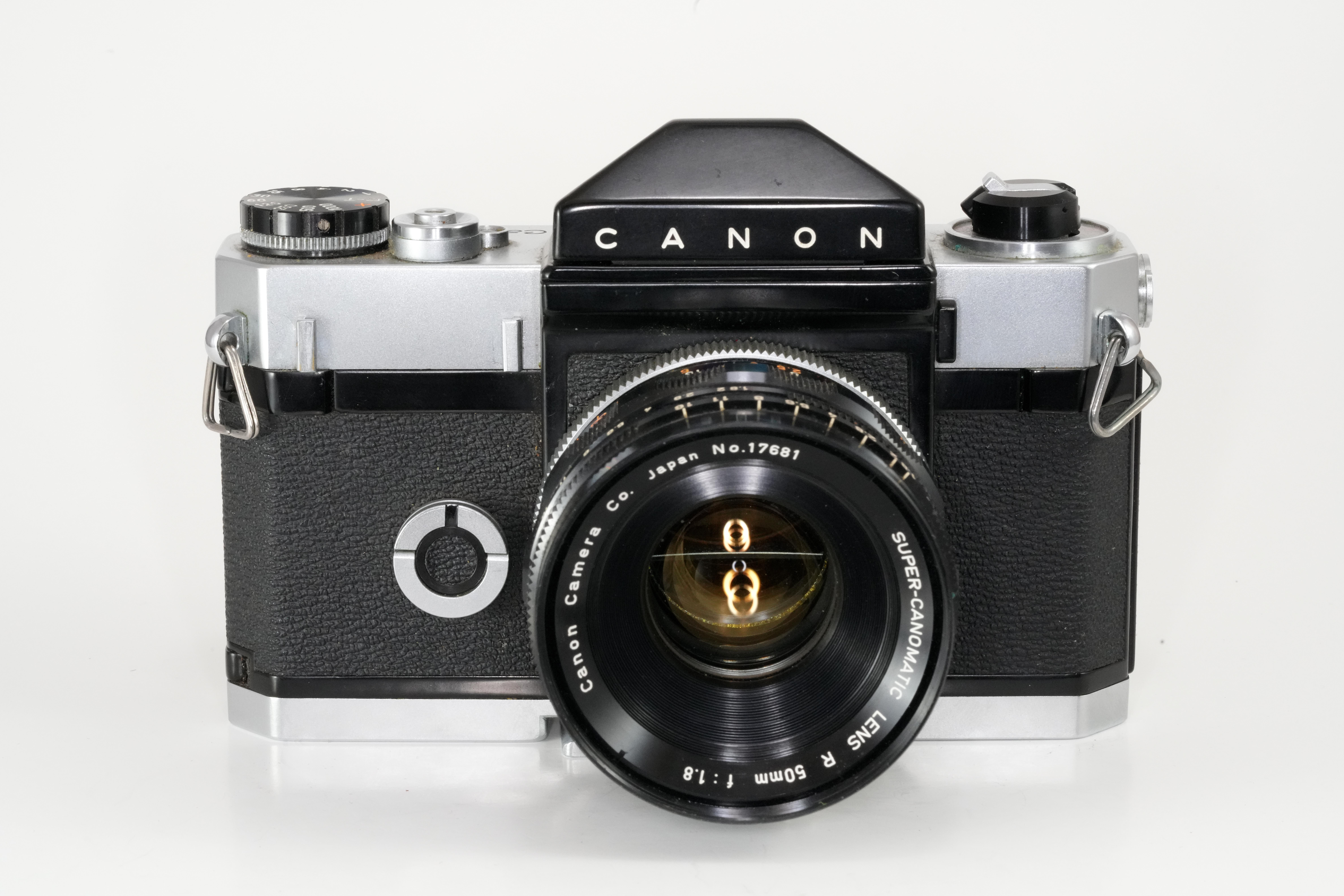
1959, Canonflex

The Canonflex was introduced in May, 1959 by Canon of Tokyo, Japan as their first 35 mm single-lens reflex camera. By the time the Canonflex released, there were already eight competing SLR cameras on the market. Its standard lens is the Super-Canomatic R 50mm f/1.8, using the first version of Canon's breech-lock manual-focus lens mount, the R lens mount, which would evolve into the Canon FL and Canon FD lens mounts over the next three decades. The Super-Canomatic lens features fully automatic aperture operation, using two internal connections. Canomatic and R-series lenses use semi-automatic or manual diaphragms. Though the breech-lock mount itself remained unchanged until the introduction of the EF lenses for EOS autofocus cameras in the late 1980s, the actuating levers of the Canomatic or R-series lenses operate differently from their FL and FD descendants.

The Canonflex was inspired to an extent by the company's rangefinder camera models. It has a wind-on lever on the camera's base operated by the left middle finger. This aided rapid shutter release but hindered tripod mounting and rendered the leather case unwieldy. At the right-hand camera front is a wide accessory shoe taking a selenium exposure meter, which couples to the shutter speed dial. The camera stayed in production for one year before it was replaced by the Canonflex R2000.

== Canonflex RP, R2000, & RM ==
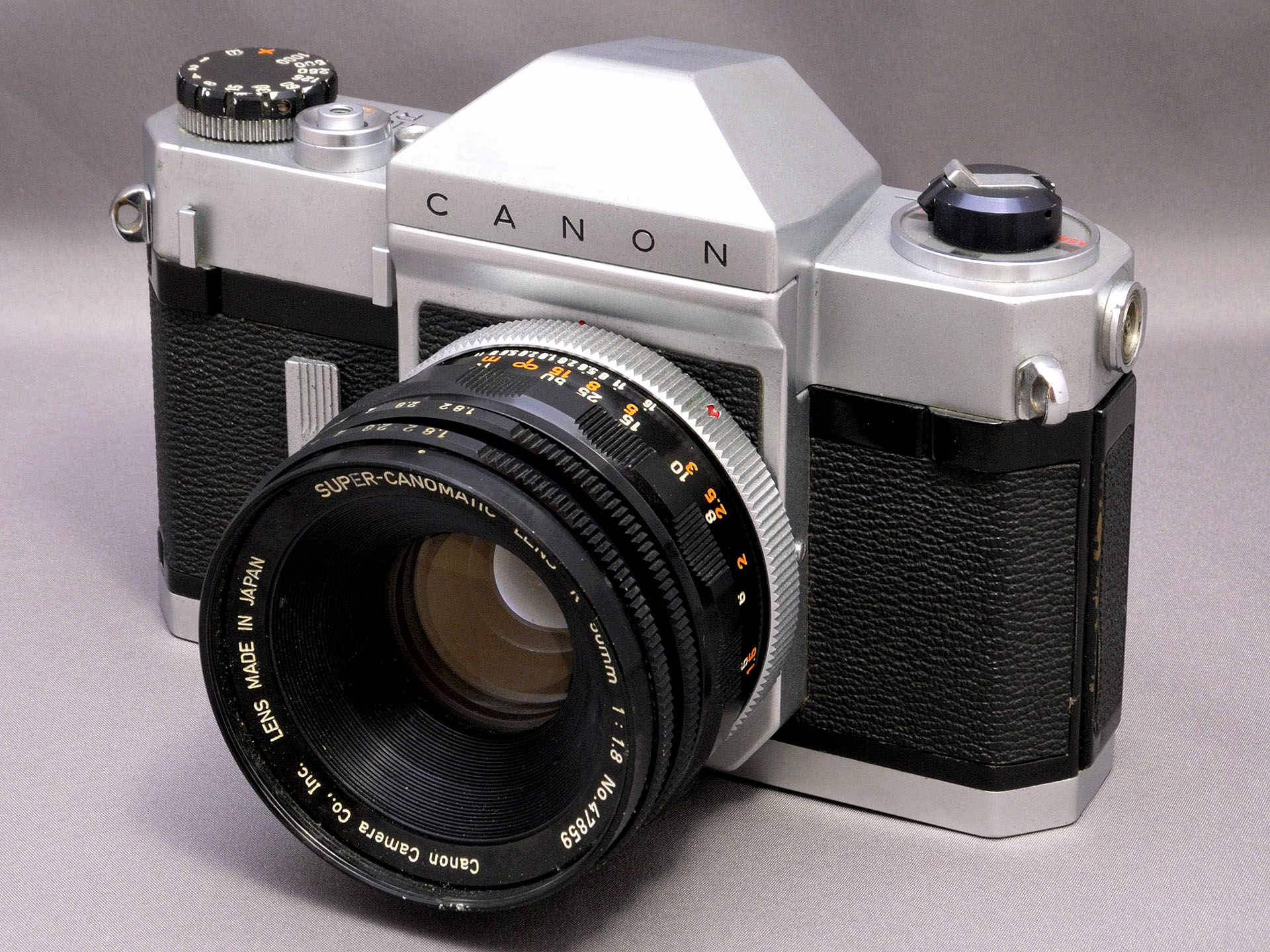
Canonflex RP

=== Canonflex RP ===
Released in September, 1960, the RP was Canon's budget version of the original Canonflex.

The RP had many of the same features as the original, but with a few notable differences:

- As a means to cut costs, the viewfinder was a fixed, eye-level pentaprism.
- The self-timer's operating mechanism was changed to a simple lever.
- The pentaprism cover and top cover were consolidated into one piece.

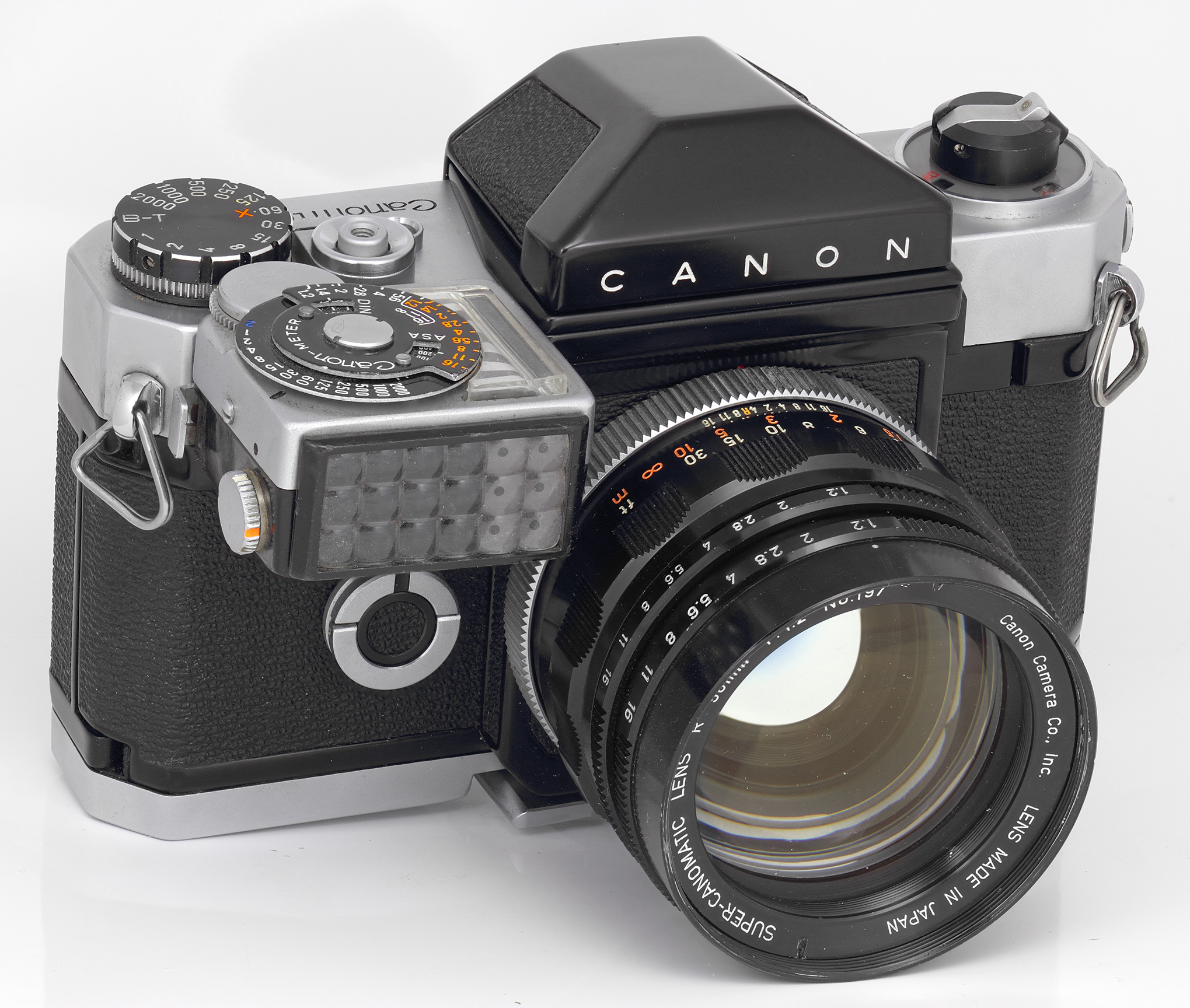
Canonflex R2000

Upon release, the Canonflex RP was priced at ¥48,000 (1960) (equivalent to ¥296,305.89 or US$1,957.54 in 2024), which included the R50mm f/1.8 lens.

=== Canonflex R2000 ===
Alongside the RP, Canon also released the R2000 as a replacement for the original Canonflex. It was nearly identical to the original, adding a 1/2000 sec. shutter speed and a thumb operated film wind lever.

Upon release, the Canonflex R200 was priced at ¥61,000 (1960) (equivalent to ¥376,555.4 or US$2,487.71 in 2024), which included the R50mm f/1.8 lens.

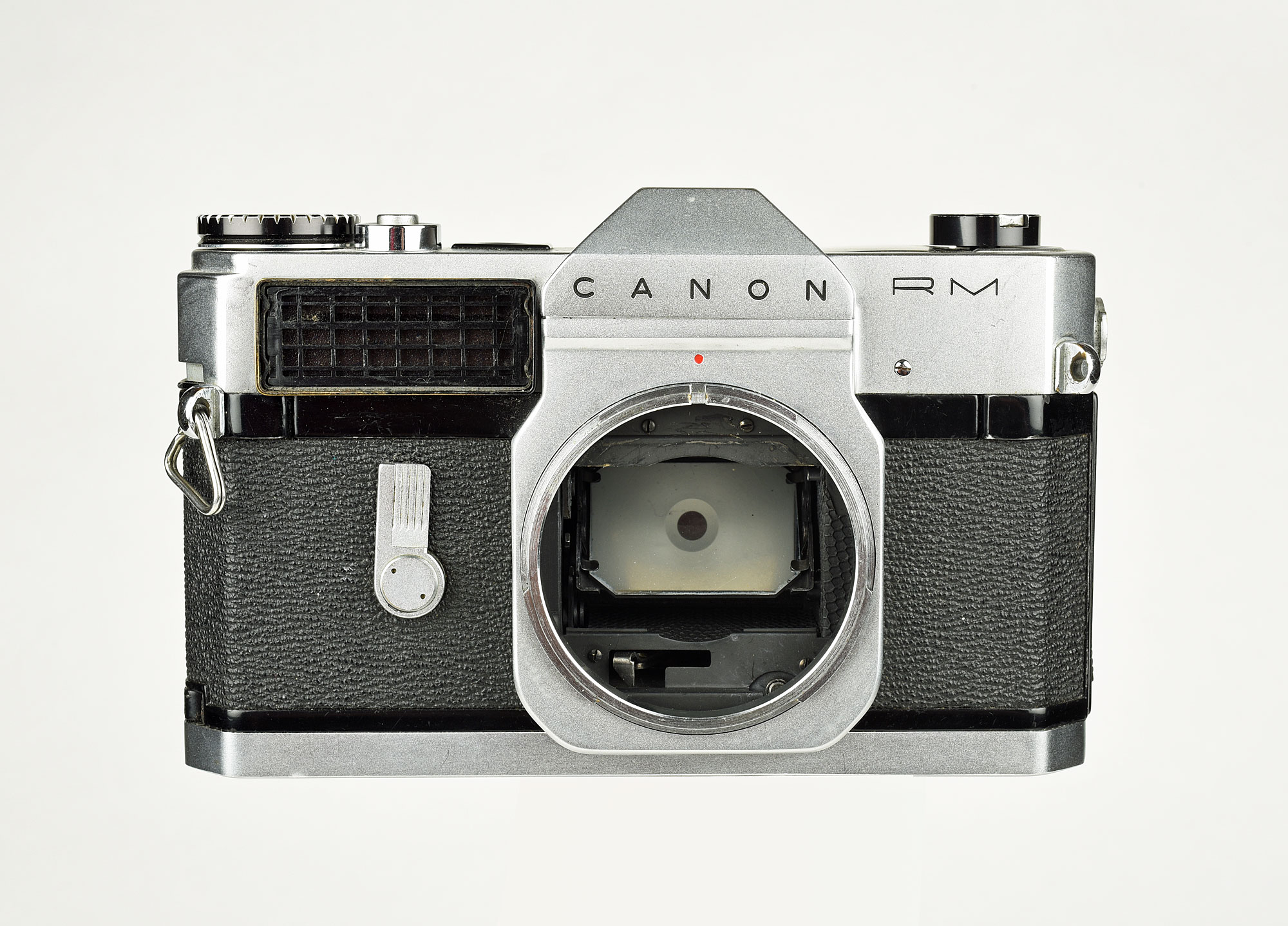
Canonflex RM without lens.

=== Canonflex RM ===
Released in April, 1962, the RM was developed as a variation on the original Canonflex chassis. The pentaprism was set lower with the top cover having a taller overall appearance. Additionally, it featured a selenium exposure meter and a low-profile film advance lever built into the top cover.

	1959	1960	1961	1962	1963	1964		1965	1966	1967	1968	1969	1970	1971	1972	1973
Cameras		Canonflex	Canonflex R2000				FX	Pellix	Pellix QL							
Cameras			Canonflex RP		Canonflex RM			FP	FT QL		TL		EX EE		EX AUTO	
