= Canon R lens mount =

Lens mount for Canon 35mm single-lens reflex cameras

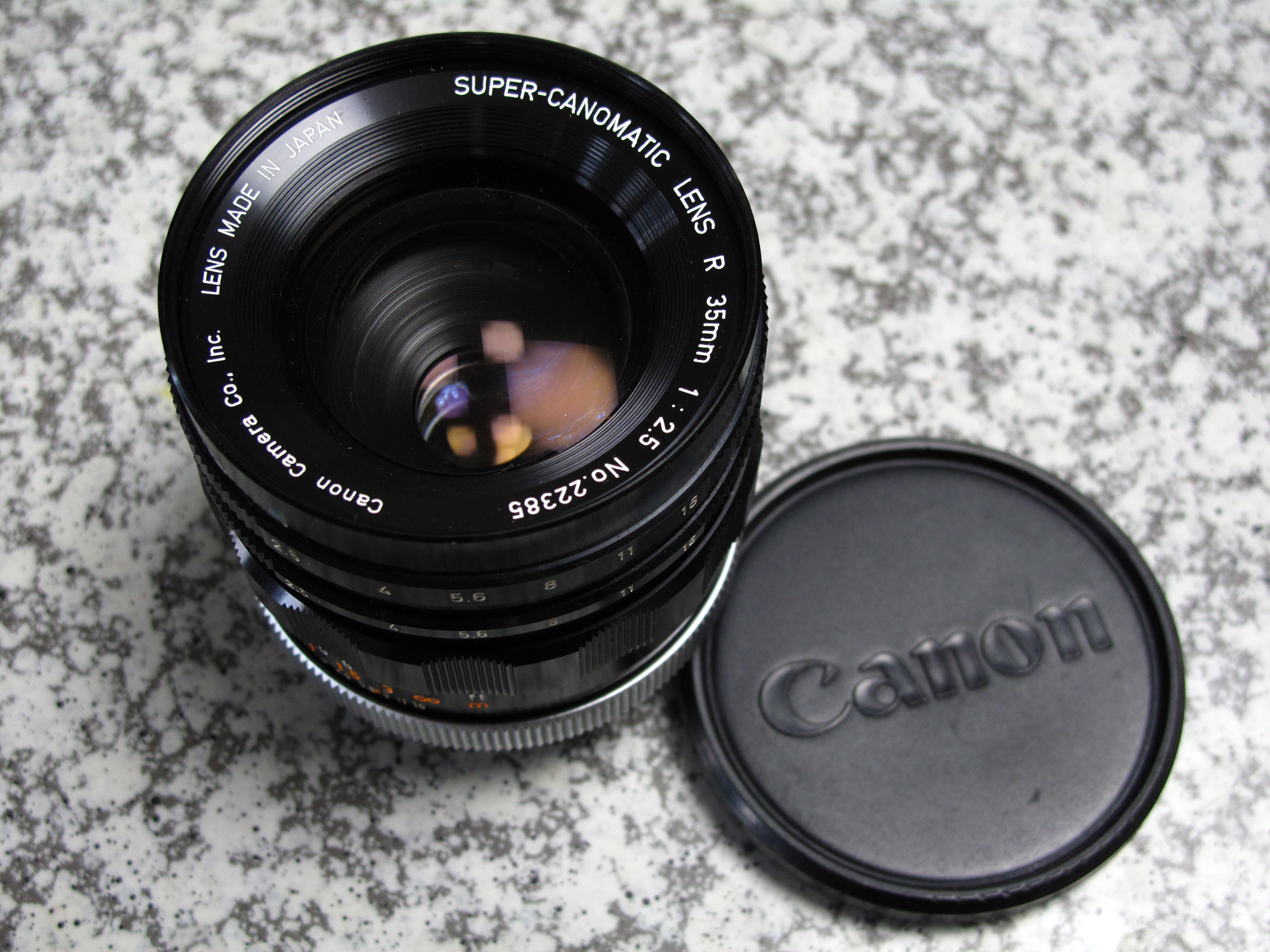
R 35mm f/2.5, the only wide angle lens Canon made with the R mount

The Canon R lens mount is a physical standard for connecting a camera lens to a 35mm single-lens reflex camera body. It was introduced in March 1959 along with the Canon Canonflex.

== Design and history ==
The R mount was used on Canon's first single lens reflex (SLR) camera. The mount employed a "breech lock" system to attach the lens to the camera body.

The R mount was discontinued in 1964 and replaced with the Canon FL lens mount. Many mirrorless interchangeable-lens cameras are able to use Canon R lenses via an adapter.

=== Description ===
Super-Canomatic R lens on right and FL lens on left, illustrating similar parts and features. Compared to "Super-Canomatic R" lenses, "Canomatic R" lenses omit the charging lever, while "Canon Lens R" lenses omit both aperture and charging levers.

Many of the lenses released for the Canon R mount have an automatic or semi-automatic diaphragm. These are distinguished by the name of the lens: "Super-Canomatic R" lenses are equipped with an automatic diaphragm, while "Canomatic R" lenses have a semi-automatic diaphragm, and a "Canon Lens R" has either a manual preset or manual diaphgram. With an automatic diaphragm, the view through the lens is maintained at the fully-open aperture while the photographer presets the aperture to the desired value; when the shutter is released, the lens stops down to the preset aperture during the exposure, then returns the aperture to fully open once the exposure is complete. The semi-automatic diaphragm works in the same way, with a small exception: the aperture does not return to fully open until after the photographer winds the film on following the exposure. Other lenses have a manual pre-set or fully manual diaphragm.

Super-Canomatic R lenses are equipped with two diaphragm control rings. The one closer to the front of the lens is the Preset Aperture Ring, used to preset the diaphragm setting for automatic opening and closing during exposure. The one closer to the back of the lens is the Visual Aperture Ring, which is used to preview depth of field. When the Preset ring is being used, the Visual ring should be turned to fully wide open. Likewise, when the Visual ring is stopped down, the Preset ring should be turned to fully open.

To mount the lens, the breech-lock ring must be turned so the red dot is aligned with the positioning pin. The positioning pin fits into the notched lug at the 12 o'clock position on the camera body, then the breech-lock ring is turned clockwise (while facing the front of the lens) to secure it on the camera. For Super-Canomatic R lenses, if the charging lever is not pre-charged before mounting the lens on the body, the automatic diaphragm mechanism will not operate for the first exposure.

Since the mechanism for controlling the aperture is different from both the later FL and FD mount, using R lenses on later bodies requires stopped-down metering mode and a manually-set aperture; however, the lugs, flange focal distance, and breech-lock ring are mutually compatible, so most R, FL, and FD lenses can use the same mount adaptors.

== R cameras ==
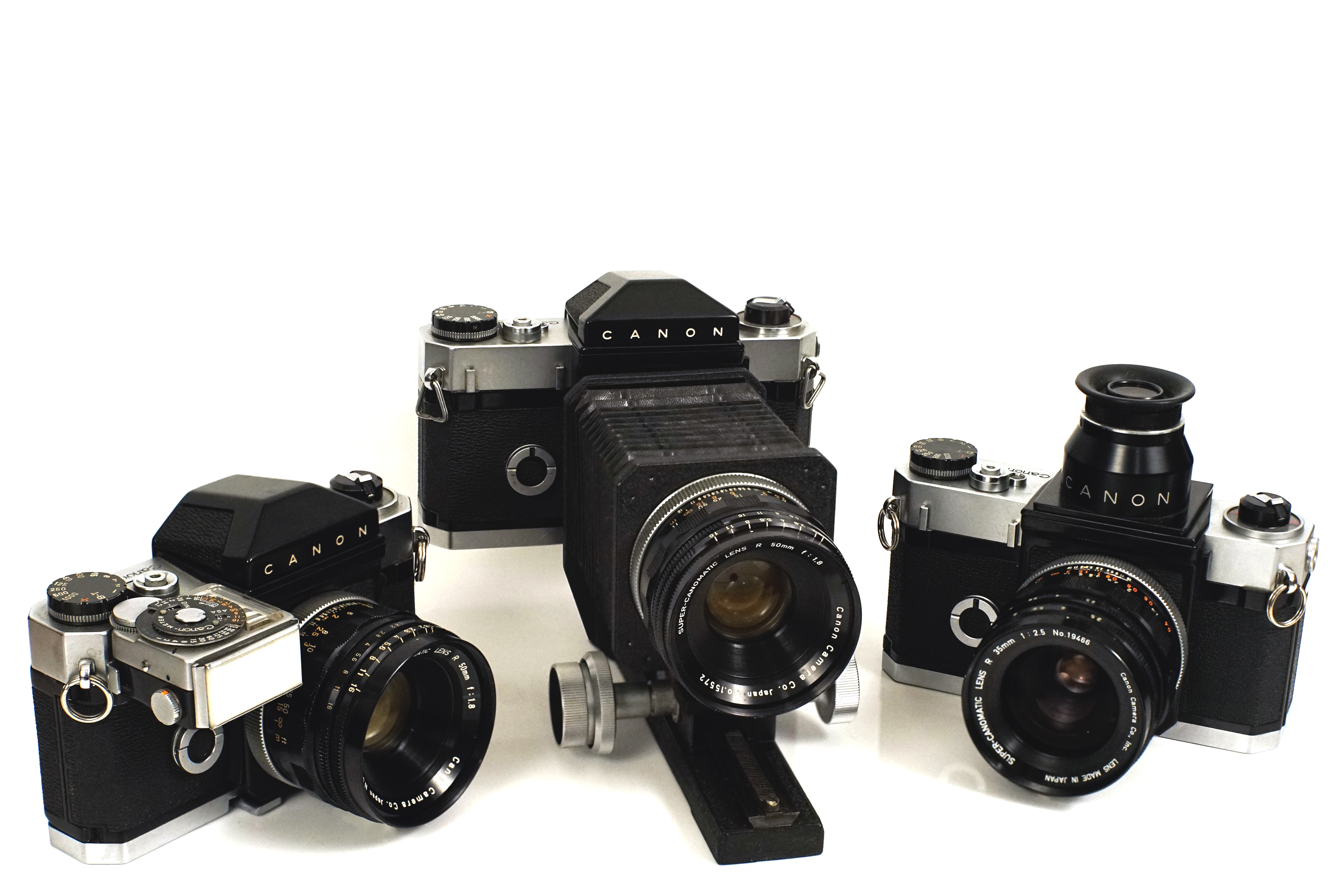
Three Canonflex cameras, showing optional waist-level magnifying finder (right), bellows (center), and clip-on external meter (left)

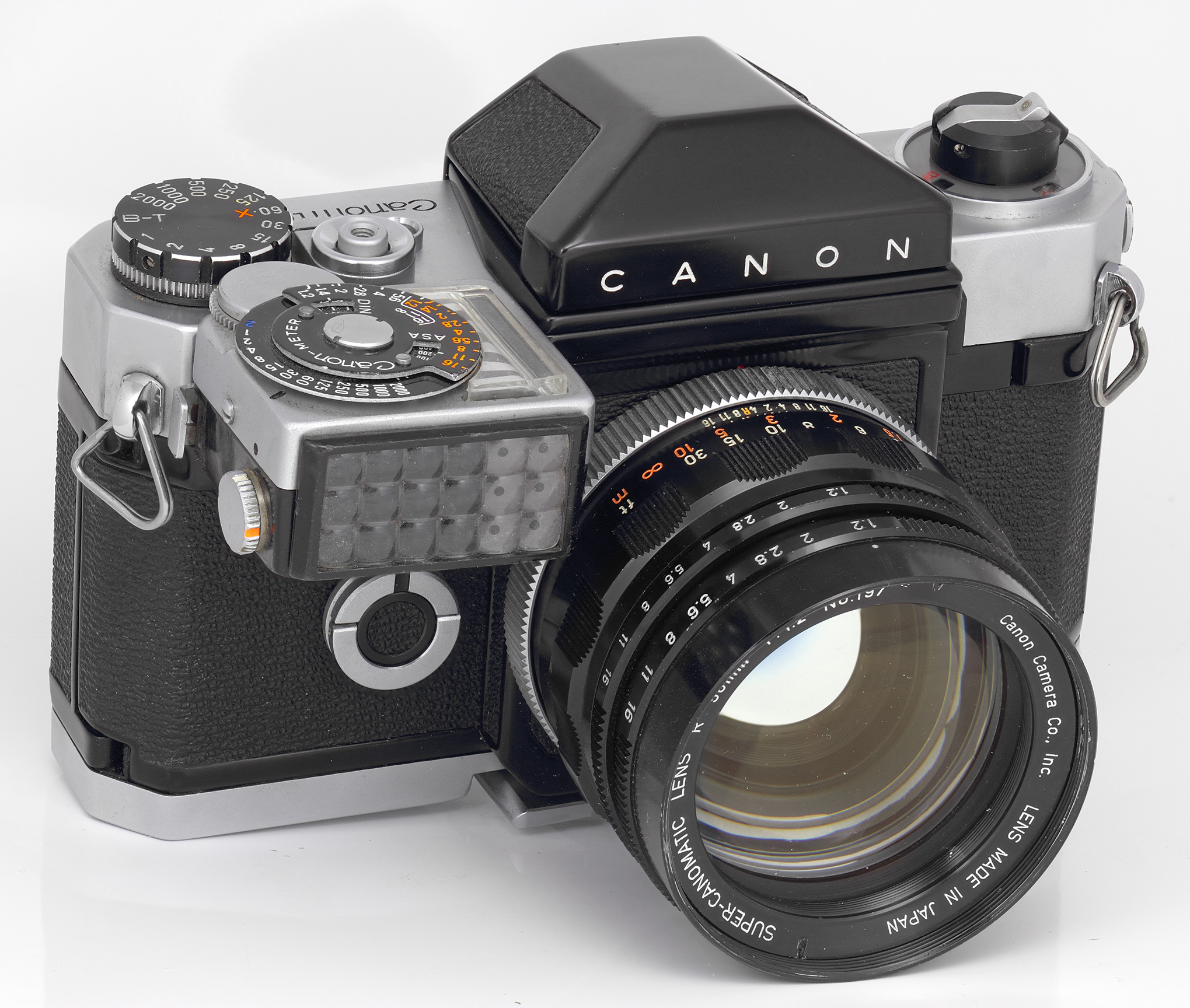
Canonflex R2000

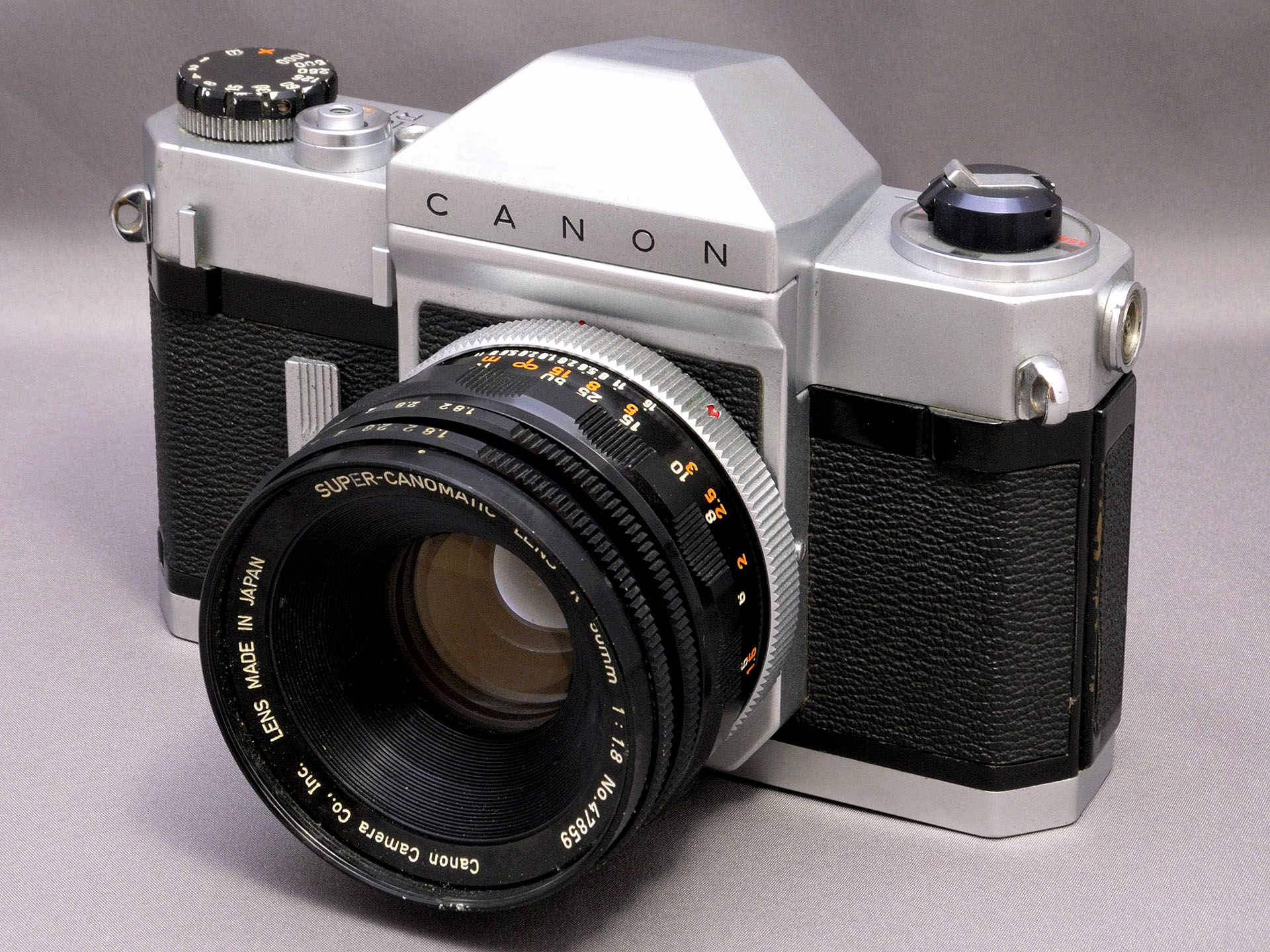
Canonflex RP

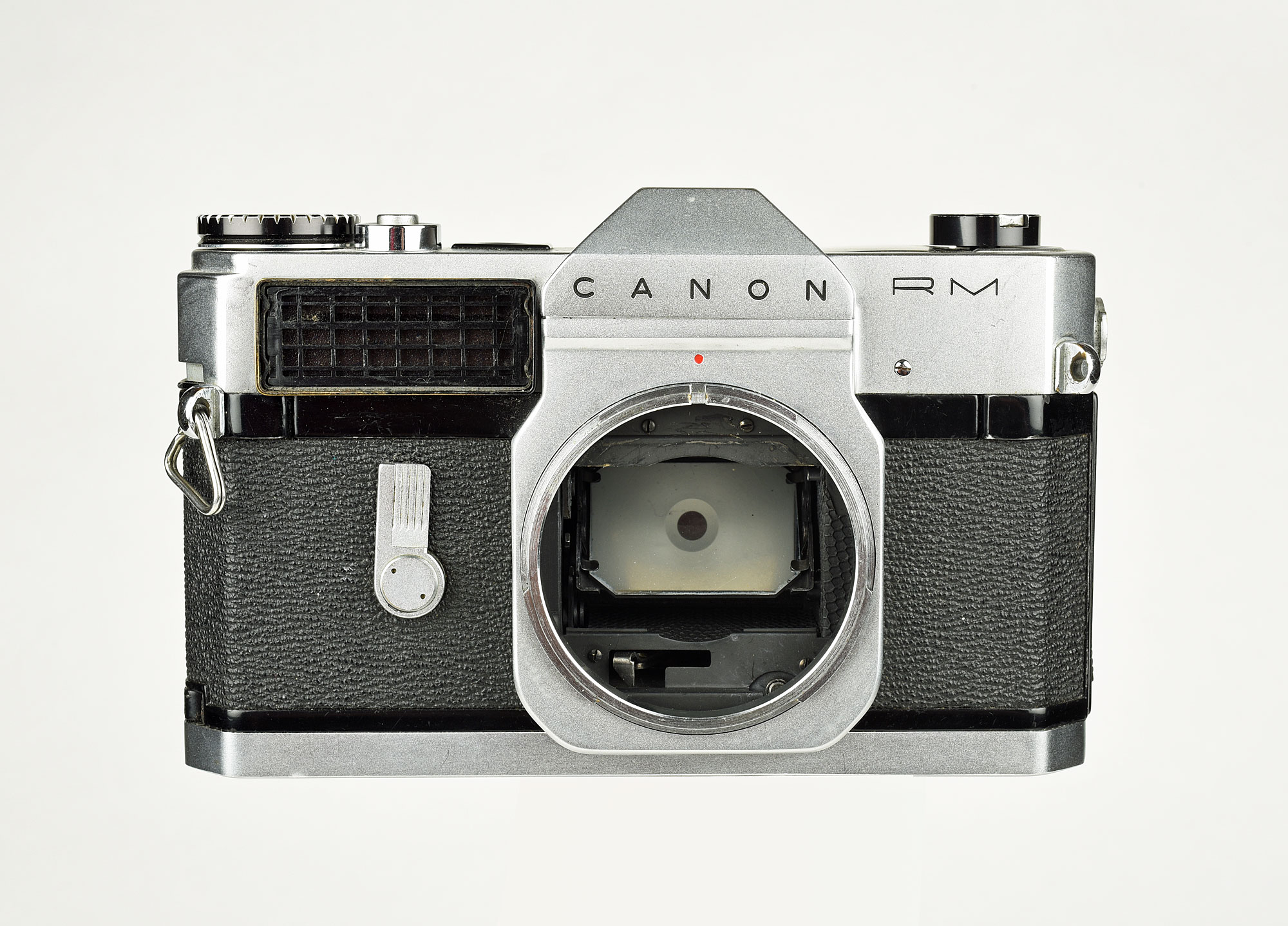
Canonflex RM
- Canon Canonflex (1959)
- Canon Canonflex R2000 (1960)
- Canon Canonflex RP (1960)
- Canon Canonflex RM (1962)

== R lenses ==
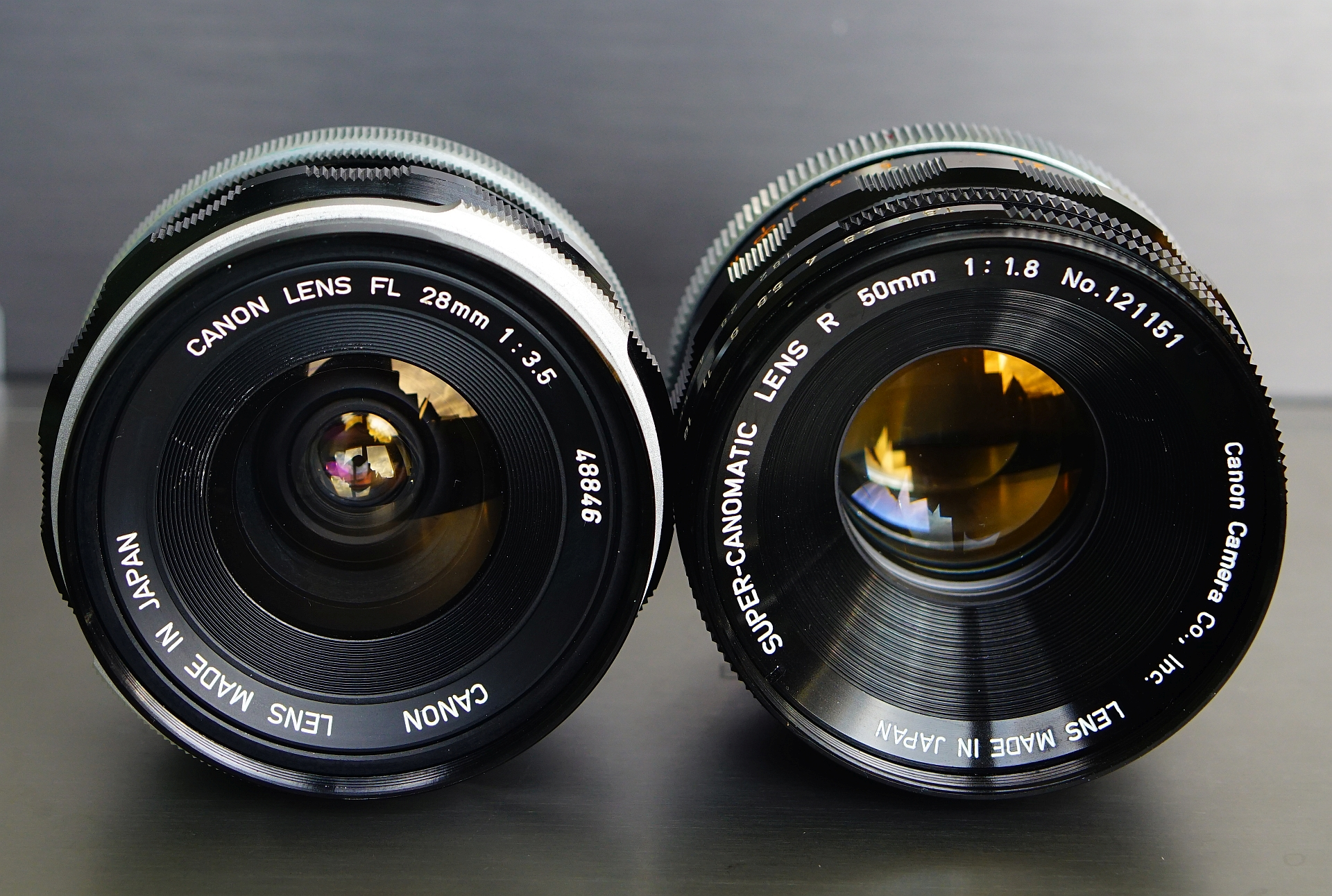
Canon FL Lens 28mm (left) and Super-Canomatic Lens R 50mm (right), as seen from the front

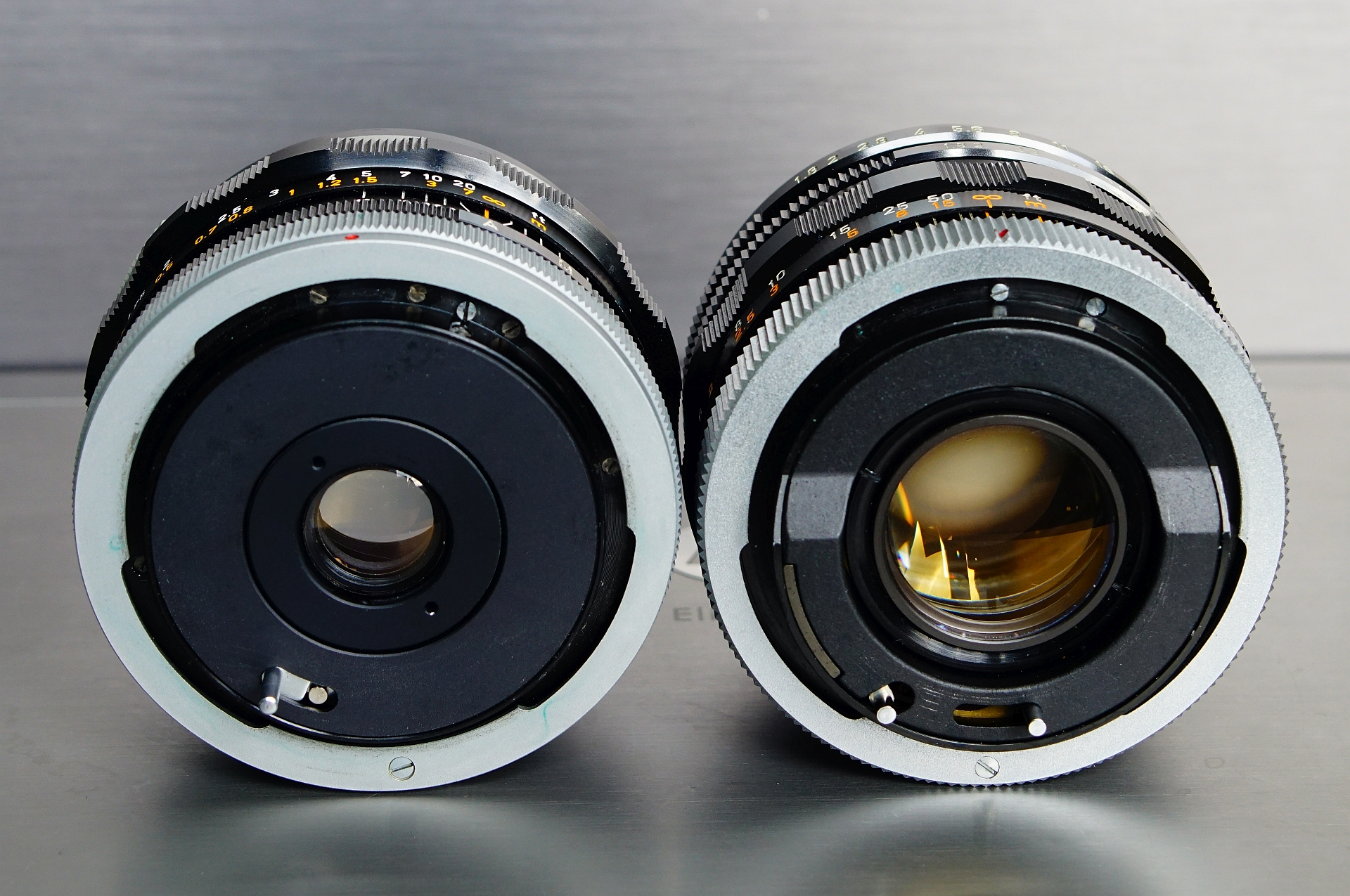
Rear of Canon FL 28mm Lens (L) and Super-Canomatic Lens R 50mm (R)

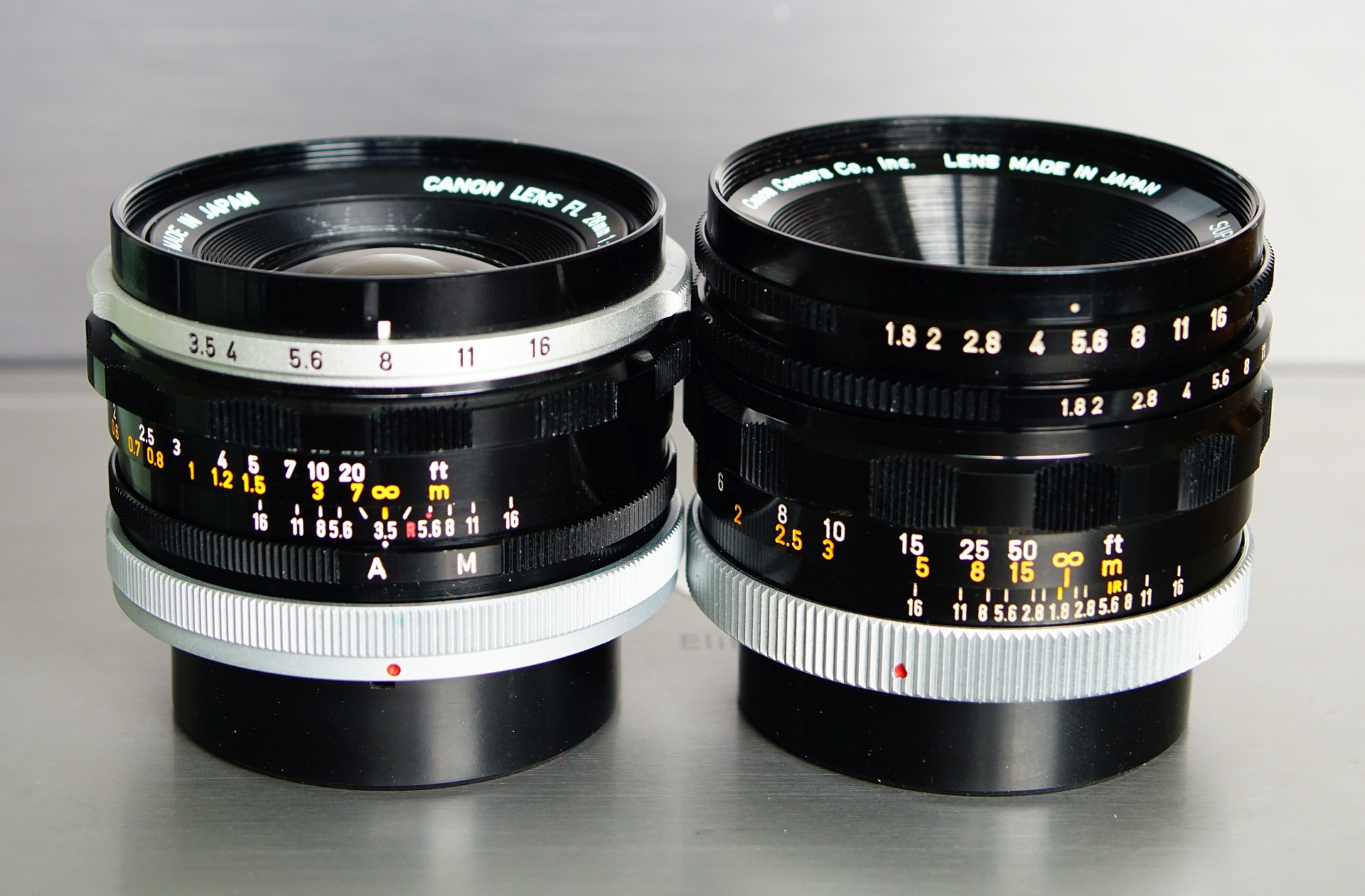
Canon FL Lens 28mm (L) and Super-Canomatic Lens R 50mm (R)

Canon R lenses
Focal length (mm)	Name	Aperture	Year	Construc. (Ele/Grp)	Min. focus (Mag.)	Filter (mm)	Dia. × Len.	Wgt.	Notes
Wide angle lenses
35	R 35mm f/2.5	f/2.5–16	Aug 1960	7/5	0.4 m (1.3 ft)	58	64.5×57 mm (2.5×2.2 in)	317 g (11.2 oz)	(Note: Super-Canomatic Lens R, fully automatic diaphragm)
Normal lenses
50	R 50mm f/1.8 I	f/1.8–16	May 1959	6/4	0.6 m (2.0 ft)	58	64.5×47.5 mm (2.5×1.9 in)	295 g (10.4 oz)	
50	R 50mm f/1.8 II	f/1.8–16	Aug 1960	6/4	0.6 m (2.0 ft)	58	64.5×47.5 mm (2.5×1.9 in)	305 g (10.8 oz)	
50	R 50mm f/1.8 III	f/1.8–16	Apr 1963	6/4	0.6 m (2.0 ft)	58	64.5×47.5 mm (2.5×1.9 in)	305 g (10.8 oz)	
58	R 58mm f/1.2	f/1.2–16	Feb 1962	7/5	0.6 m (2.0 ft)	58	64.5×52.8 mm (2.5×2.1 in)	432 g (15.2 oz)	
Telephoto lenses
85	R 85mm f/1.9	f/1.9–22	Jan 1960	6/4	1 m (3.3 ft)	58	63×74.5 mm (2.5×2.9 in)	355 g (12.5 oz)	(Note: Canon Lens R, manual diaphragm)
85	R 85mm f/1.8	f/1.8–16	Oct 1961	5/4	1 m (3.3 ft)	58	64.5×55.5 mm (2.5×2.2 in)	470 g (17 oz)	
100	R 100mm f/2	f/2–16	Sep 1959	6/4	1 m (3.3 ft)	58	68×83 mm (2.7×3.3 in)	515 g (18.2 oz)	
100	R 100mm f/3.5 (I)	f/3.5–22	May 1961	5/4	1 m (3.3 ft)	40	?	210 g (7.4 oz)	(Note: Canon Lens R, manual pre-set diaphgram)
100	R 100mm f/3.5 (II)	f/3.5–22	Apr 1963	5/4	1 m (3.3 ft)	40	?	210 g (7.4 oz)	
135	R 135mm f/2.5	f/2.5–16	Feb 1960	6/4	1.5 m (4.9 ft)	58	68×103.5 mm (2.7×4.1 in)	630 g (22 oz)	
135	R 135mm f/3.5 I	f/3.5–22	May 1959	4/3	1.5 m (4.9 ft)	48	60.5×86.5 mm (2.4×3.4 in)	370 g (13 oz)	
135	R 135mm f/3.5 II	f/3.5–22	Jul 1961	4/3	1.5 m (4.9 ft)	48	60.5×86.5 mm (2.4×3.4 in)	350 g (12 oz)	
200	R 200mm f/3.5	f/3.5–22	May 1959	7/5	2.5 m (8.2 ft)	58	68×104.5 mm (2.7×4.1 in)	670 g (24 oz)	(Note: Canomatic Lens R, semi-automatic diaphragm)
300	R 300mm f/4	f/4–22	Jan 1960	5/4	1.5 m (4.9 ft)	48	91×135.4 mm (3.6×5.3 in)	1,200 g (42 oz)	
400	R 400mm f/4.5	f/4.5–22	Jan 1960	5/4	3.1 m (10.2 ft)	48	100×208.4 mm (3.9×8.2 in)	1,700 g (60 oz)	
600	R 600mm f/5.6	f/5.6–32	Jan 1960	2/1	6.4 m (21.0 ft)	48	118×384 mm (4.6×15.1 in)	2,100 g (74 oz)	
800	R 800mm f/8	f/8–32	Jan 1960	2/1	13.5 m (44.3 ft)	48	112×566 mm (4.4×22.3 in)	1,900 g (67 oz)	
1000	R 1000mm f/11	f/11–32	Jan 1960	2/1	21 m (68.9 ft)	48	100×718 mm (3.9×28.3 in)	1,800 g (63 oz)	
2000	TV 2000mm f/11	f/11	Sep 1960	7/4	20 m (65.6 ft)	48	246×603 mm (9.7×23.7 in)	10,620 g (375 oz)	
Zoom lenses
55–135	R 55–135mm f/3.5	f/3.5–22	Dec 1963	15/10	2 m (6.6 ft)	58	69×140 mm (2.7×5.5 in)	790 g (28 oz)	
