= Canon Palmtronic LE-80M =

Early hand-held calculator

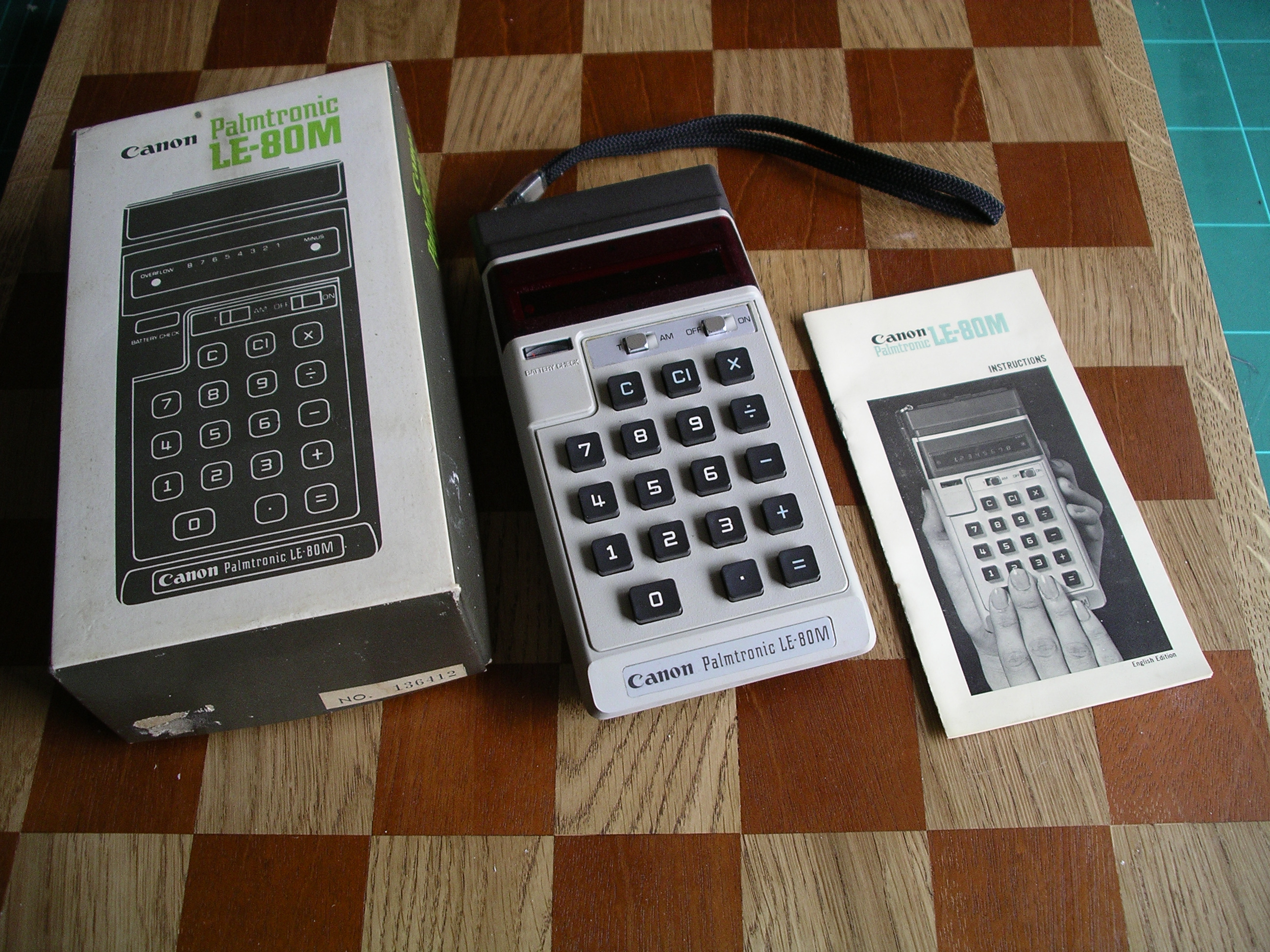
Canon Palmtronic LE-80M calculator (on 5cm squares)

The Canon Palmtronic LE-80M is an early hand-held calculator. It was manufactured by Canon inc. Unlike other models which used a processing chip manufactured by Texas Instruments the LE-80M used a Hitachi HD3553 chip. When first released in 1973, it retailed for $138.45.
