= Walter A. Fallon =

American chemist and business executive

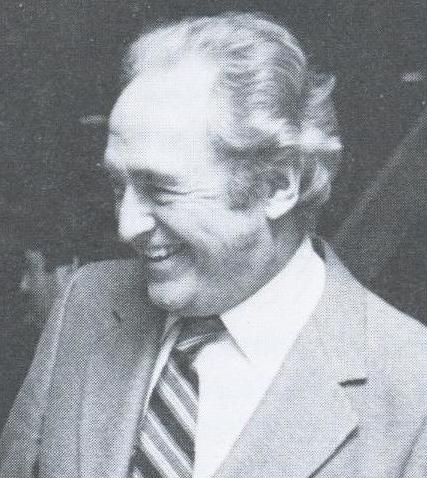
- Fallon in 1983
- Born: Walter Addison Fallon; June 7, 1918; Schenectady, New York
- Died: July 25, 2002 (aged 84); Irondequoit, New York
- Education: Union College; Rensselaer Polytechnic Institute
- Occupation(s): Chemist; Business executive
- Known for: Chief executive of the Eastman Kodak Company

Walter Addison Fallon (June 7, 1918 – July 25, 2002) was an American chemist, business executive at Eastman Kodak Company, and recipient of the 1983 Henry Laurence Gantt Medal.

Fallon was born in Schenectady, New York in 1918, son of Walter A. Fallon and Irene (Casier) Fallon. He studied chemistry, and obtained his undergraduate degree from Union College in 1940, and graduated from Rensselaer Polytechnic Institute in 1941.

After his graduation he started his lifelong career at Eastman Kodak in 1941. In 1972 he was appointed chief executive and president, and since 1977 also served as its chairman until his retirement in July 1983. Under his tenure sales increased from $3.48 billion in 1972 to $10.8 billion in 1982. In 1983 he received the Henry Laurence Gantt Medal.
