= Kodak Charmera =

Digital camera model

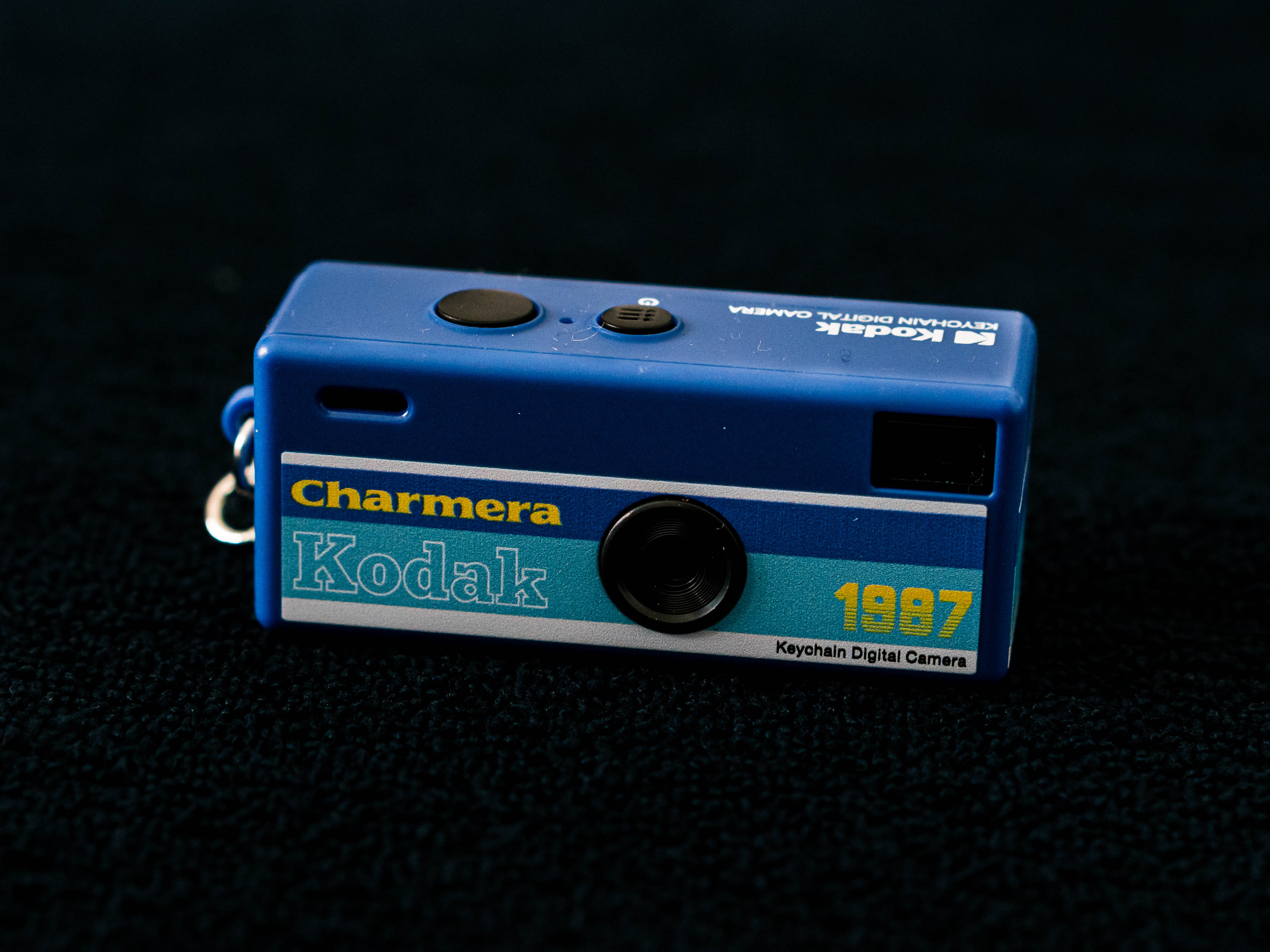

Overview
- Maker: Kodak
- Type: Point-and-shoot

Lens
- Lens: 35 mm equivalent
- F-numbers: f/2.4

Sensor/medium
- Sensor: 1/4"
- Sensor type: CMOS
- Maximum resolution: 1440 × 1080 = 1,555,200 pixels (1.6 megapixels)
- Storage media: microSD

Flash
- Flash: LED

General
- LCD screen: Live preview
- Dimensions: 58×24.5×20 mm (2.28×0.96×0.79 in)
- Weight: 30 g (1 oz)

The Kodak Charmera is a point and shoot keychain digital camera announced on September 3, 2025 and was released on the 10th. It is manufactured by RETO Production, under license by Kodak. The camera is a recreation of Kodak's first ever disposable camera, the Kodak Fling. The initial series release featured six regular designs with the yellow model being reminiscent of the original design of the Fling, and a secret transparent color with a lower probability of being drawn.

The camera features a 1/4-inch CMOS sensor at 1.6-megapixel resolution, capable of shooting 1440 × 1080 JPEG photos and recording 1080p AVI videos at 30 fps. The lens is fixed at a 35mm equivalent with an f/2.4 aperture.

The camera attracted high-demand due to its small form which includes a keychain attachment, blind-box packaging concept, image quality and affordable price.

== Key features ==
- 1.6 megapixels
- 1/4" CMOS sensor
- microSD card slot up to 128GB
- USB-C for charging and file transfer
- 7 built-in filters and 4 frames
- LED flash
- Five physical buttons (Power/Menu, Shutter, Up, Down, and Playback/Select)
- Optical viewfinder
- 0.8in live preview LED
- Keychain hole
- Small speaker for flash sound effect
- 200mAh LiPo battery

== Included accessories ==
- USB-A to USB-C cable
- Keychain clasp
- Design card
- Poster
