= Kodak Ektra (phone) =

Smartphone with Kodak inspired design

The Kodak Ektra is a smartphone that was built and sold by the Bullitt Group using a design that referenced the 1941 Kodak Ektra camera. The phone was not built by Eastman Kodak. It was announced in 2016, was released to the public in 2017 with mixed reviews. Support for the camera ended 30 April 2020.

== Specifications ==
The phone's features include:

- 5-inch 1080p IPS display
- Rear camera: 21-megapixel camera with f/2.0 aperture, using Sony's IMX230 image sensor
- Front camera: 13-megapixel sensor and f/2.2 lens
- Phase detect autofocus, 6-axis optical image stabilisation, HDR and 4K video capture
- 3 GB of RAM
- 32 GB of hard drive storage with microSD expansion slot
- MediaTek Helio X20 processor (two high-performance 64-bit ARM Cortex-A72 CPU cores, eight low=-power Cortex-A53 cores, and a Mali-T880 GPU)
- Android 6.0 "Marshmallow"
- 3,000 mAh battery
