= LAC Group =

Library-services company

- Type: Private
- Industry: Library Services, Library & Research Staffing, Information & Asset Management, Consulting & Project Management
- Founded: Beverly Hills, California, U.S. (1986)
- Founder: Deb Schwarz
- Headquarters: Los Angeles, California, U.S.
- Number of locations: 5 offices (2019)
- Area served: North America
- Key people: Deb Schwarz (Founder), Rob Corrao (CEO)
- Services: Staffing; Recruiting; Consulting; Technical Services
- Owner: TZP Growth Partners
- Number of employees: 424 (2019)
- Website: lac-group.com

LAC Group, formerly known as Library Associates Companies (LAC), is an information services vendor for research and intelligence, library operations, spend and cost management and media archiving. The company provides skilled staffing and consulting services primarily to law firms, Fortune 1000 corporations and government agencies.

== History ==
LAC Group was founded in 1986 by Deb Schwarz as a staffing agency specializing in law libraries.

By 1989, it was offering technical services and serving other academic and other special libraries. In 1999, Library Associates caused a stir in library circles and gained national attention when they were selected by Pillsbury Madison & Sutro LLP to manage their library operations.

The company continued its expansion into different markets with its acquisition of Medical Library Consultants (MLC) from Betsey Beamish in 2001 and of Sanad Support Technologies from Jodi and Fuad Suleiman in 2003. With the acquisition of Sanad, Library Associates consisted of two divisions, Library Associates and Library Associates of Maryland, which were integrated as Library Associates Companies in 2007.

In 2009, the company name was changed to LAC Group. Subsequent acquisitions include spend management consulting firm Chase Cost Management in 2011, film archiving business PRO-TEK Vaults from Eastman Kodak in 2013, and competitive research agency ShiftCentral in 2019.

In 2023, LAC Group merged with HBR Consulting and Wilson Allen to form Harbor.

== Services ==
LAC Group's service lines of business include: Consulting & Project Management, Information & Asset Management, Library Staffing & Research Services, Legal Staffing, Managed Services, and Recruiting.

== See also ==
- Recruitment process outsourcing
