= Kodak Pixpro =

Series of digital cameras

Kodak PixPro is a production series of digital cameras produced since 2013. They are developed and designed by JK Imaging of Gardena, California, under license from the Eastman Kodak Company.

== Friendly Zoom ==
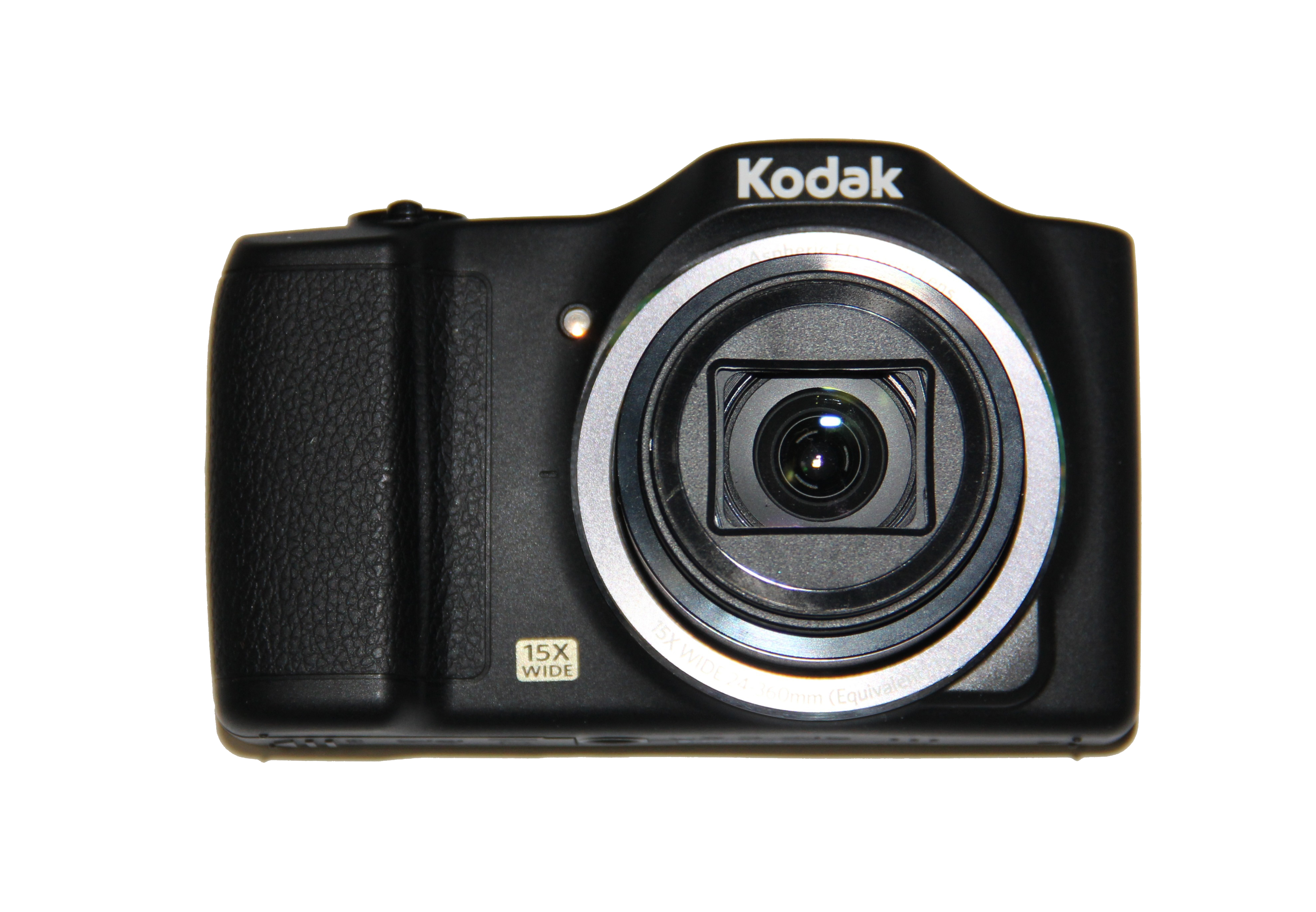
Kodak Pixpro FZ152 front

The Kodak PixPro FX series (Friendly Zoom) consist of compact pocket-sized point-and-shoot cameras.

Model	Release	Sensor res., size	Lens (35 mm equiv.) zoom, aperture	Screen size, pixels	Dimensions W (mm) × H (mm) × D (mm)	Weight	Image	Features	Ref.
FZ201	July 2014		25–500mm, 20x optical						
FZ152	2017	16 MP, 1/2.3" CCD	24–360mm, 15x optical,						
FZ151	2015	16 MP, 1/2.3" CCD	24–360mm, 15x optical,						
FZ55	April 2023	16 MP, 1/2.3" CMOS	28–140mm, 5x optical						
FZ53	2016	16 MP, 1/2.3" CCD							
FZ45	2023	16 MP, 1/2.3" CMOS						AA batteries	
FZ43	2015	16 MP, 1/2.3" CCD						AA batteries	
FZ41	2013	16 MP, 1/2.3" CCD						AA batteries	

== Waterproof and Action ==
Model	Release	Sensor res., size	Lens (35 mm equiv.) zoom, aperture	Screen size, pixels	Dimensions W (mm) × H (mm) × D (mm)	Weight	Image	Features	Ref.
WPZ2								Waterproof	
SP360	2014					103 g			
SP360 4K									
ORBIT360 4K									
WP1								Waterproof	
SPZ1									
SP1									

== Astro Zoom ==
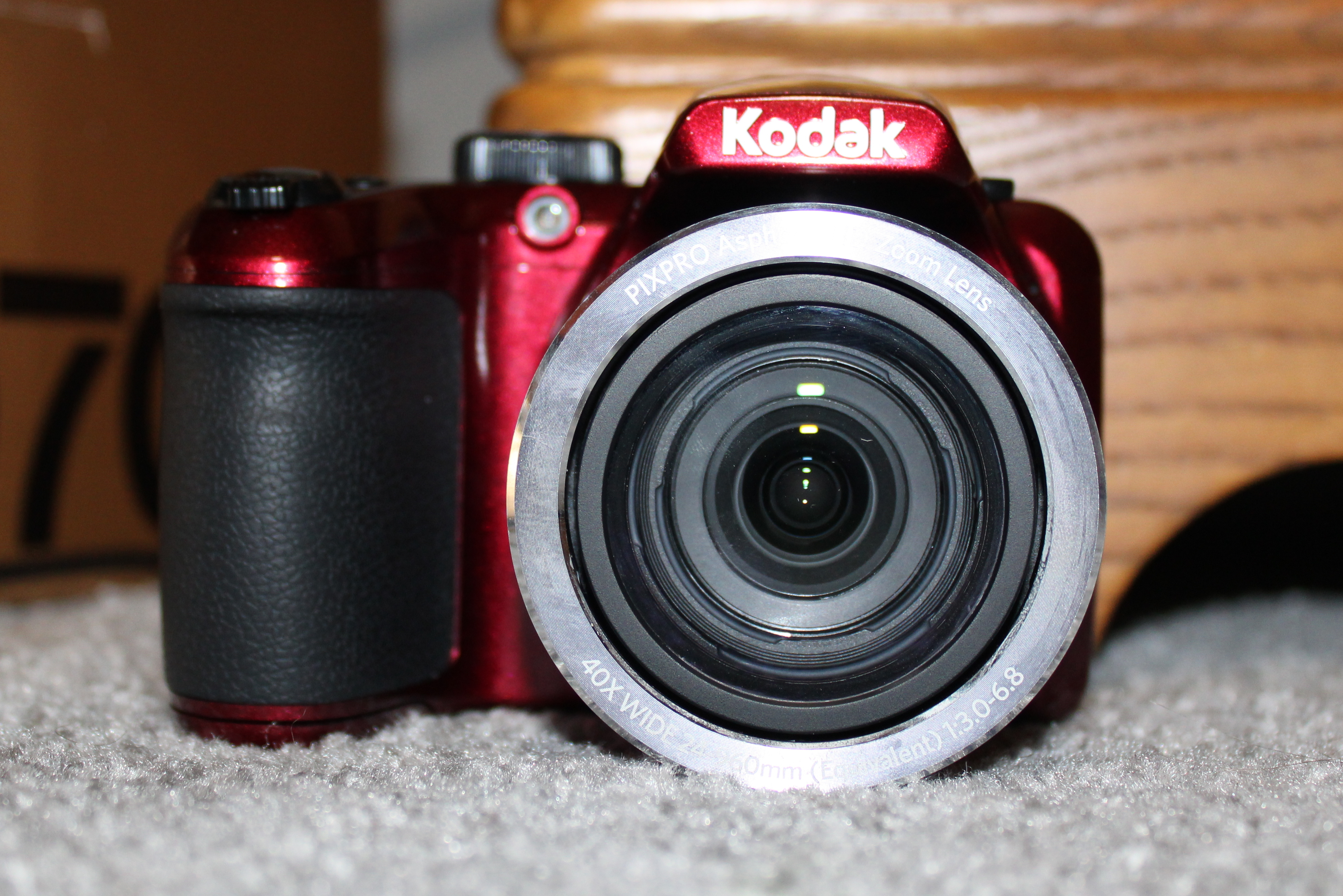
Kodak Pixpro AZ401

The AZ series (Astro Zoom) consists of fixed-lens superzoom bridge cameras.

Model	Release	Sensor res., size	Lens (35 mm equiv.) zoom, aperture	Screen size, pixels	Dimensions W (mm) × H (mm) × D (mm)	Weight	Image	Features	Ref.
AZ1000	2018								
AZ901									
AZ653	2026		65x optical						
AZ652									
AZ651									
AZ528									
AZ525									
AZ522									
AZ521	2014								
AZ501									
AZ425									
AZ421									
AZ405									
AZ401									
AZ365									
AZ362									
AZ361									
AZ255									
AZ252									
AZ251									

== C series ==
The Kodak PixPro C cameras are compact point-and-shoots like the FX, but with more fashionable and retro designs.

Model	Release	Sensor res., size	Lens (35 mm equiv.) zoom, aperture	Screen size, pixels	Dimensions W (mm) × H (mm) × D (mm)	Weight	Image	Features	Ref.
C1	Jun 2025	1/3-inch BSI CMOS	26mm fixed focal length, no optical zoom	2.8" tilting	103 x 60 x 20.3	115 g (body)			
C10	TBA 2026	TBA	TBA	TBA	TBA	TBA			

== Mirrorless ==
There has only been one mirrorless camera released in the Kodak PixPro line.

Model	Release	Sensor res., size	Lens (35 mm equiv.) zoom, aperture	Screen size, pixels	Dimensions W (mm) × H (mm) × D (mm)	Weight	Image	Features	Ref.
S-1	2014	16 MP, Micro Four Thirds		3.0", 920,000	116 x 68 x 36	290 g (w/ battery)			

== Lenses ==
- SL25
- SL10
- SL5
