= Olympus M.Zuiko Digital ED 300 mm f/4 IS Pro =

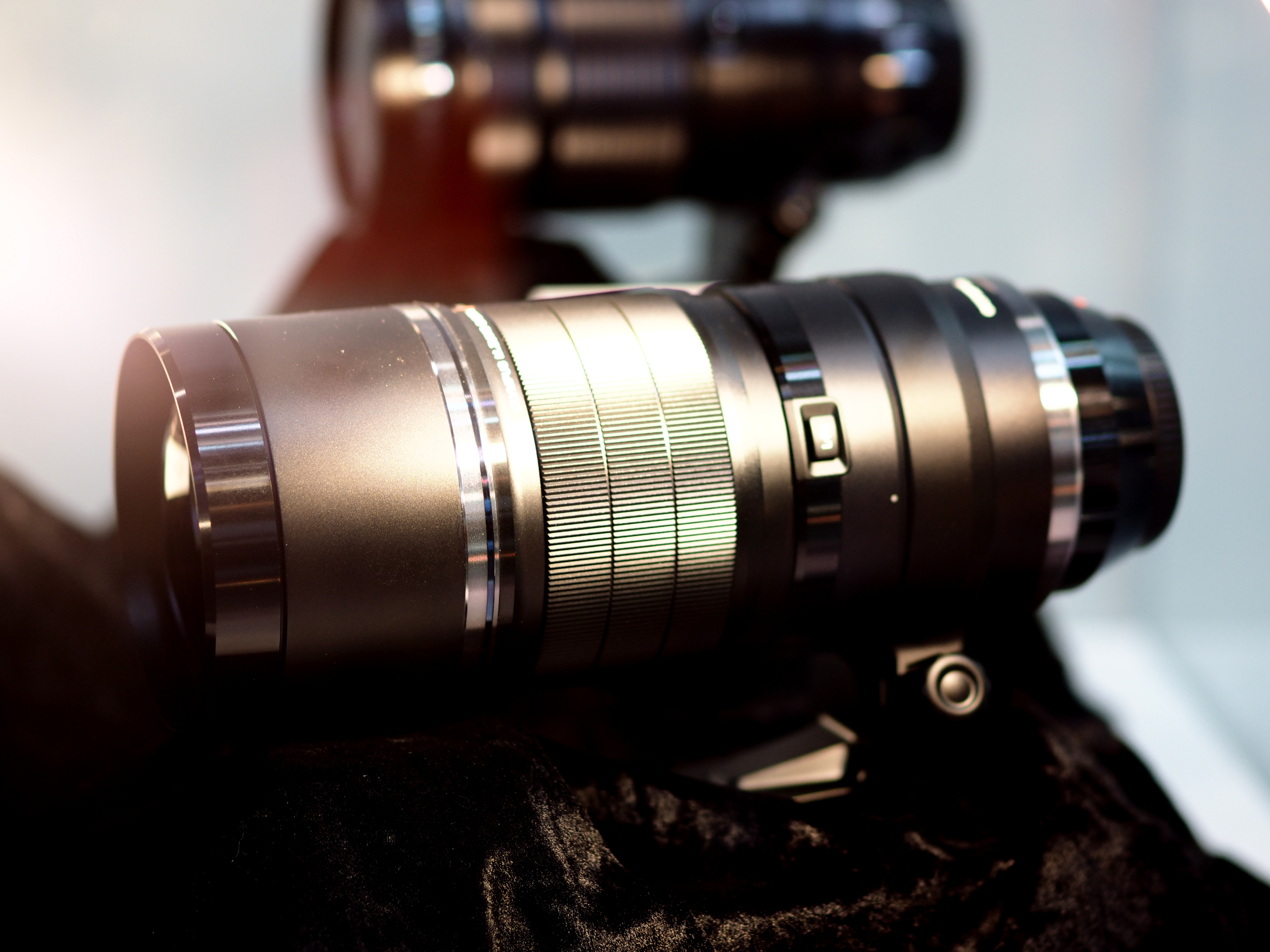
- Maker: Olympus
- Lens mount: Micro Four Thirds

Technical data
- Type: telephoto lens
- Focus drive: stepper
- Focal length: 300 mm
- Focal length (35mm equiv.): 600 mm
- Crop factor: 2
- Aperture (max/min): f/4.0 / f/22
- Close focus distance: 1.4 m
- Diaphragm blades: 7, circular
- Construction: 17 elements in 10 groups

Features
- Ultrasonic motor: Yes Yes
- Weather-sealing: Yes Yes
- Lens-based stabilization: Yes Yes
- Macro capable: Yes Yes
- Unique features: aspheric
- Application: distant shots

Physical
- Max. length: 227 mm
- Diameter: 92.5 mm
- Weight: 1270 g
- Filter diameter: 77 mm

Accessories
- Lens hood: integrated

History
- Introduction: January 2016

Olympus M.Zuiko Digital ED 300 mm f/4 IS Pro is an optically corrected telephoto lens. With its extreme focal length of 300 millimeters it is the refracting prime lens with the longest focal length available on the Micro Four Thirds system (end of 2026).

== Description ==
The ED 300 mm f/4 IS Pro has been available since January 2016. This lens has a clutch-linked focusing ring, it is water and dust proof and is equipped with an autofocus system. It is the first Olympus M.Zuiko lens to have in-built image stabilization.

The lens has a full frame equivalent focal length of 600mm, created with 17 lens elements in 10 groups which give a diagonal angle of view of 4.1°. The lens uses one Super ED (Super Extra-Low Dispersion), three HR (High-Refractive index) and one E-HR (Extra-High Refractive index) elements to improve image quality. This results in low aberration, low distortion and almost no visible vignetting.

Due to the large focal length and its toughness the lens is suitable for wildlife photography and sports photography, but is less flexible than other options like the Panasonic Leica DG Vario-Elmar 100-400 mm due to its fixed focal length. Some high end Olympus and OM-System camera bodies are able to combine the effects of their in-body image stabilization (IBIS) and optical stabilization system in the lens via "Sync IS" in order to achieve a stronger stabilizing effect than either mechanism could provide on its own. This allows for handheld shots with longer exposure times than would be otherwise possible.

== Comparison ==
Compared to other camera systems with differing normal focal lengths, and therefore different image sensor sizes, the following equivalent values apply to lenses with appropriate properties as the M.Zuiko 300 mm f/4 within the Micro-Four-Thirds system (MFT). With the parameters given in the table in all camera systems the photographer will get a similar angle of view, depth of field, diffraction limitation and motion blur:

Image sensor format	Focal lengths at the same angle of view (diagonal angle ≈ 4°)	F-number at the same depth of field	ISO speed at the same exposure time
Nikon CX	200 mm	2.8	100
MFT	300 mm	4.0	200
APS-C	400 mm	5.6	360
Full frame	600 mm	8.0	800
