= G80 =

G80 may refer to:

== Technology ==
- Nvidia G80, codename for the Nvidia GeForce 8800 series of GPUs
- Panasonic Lumix DMC-G80, a camera model
- Sega G80, an arcade board model

== Transportation ==
=== Vehicles ===
- BMW G80 M3, a generation of the BMW M3 sports car
- Genesis G80, a luxury car
- Innoson IVM G80, an SUV
- Matchless G80, a motorcycle

=== Other ===
- G80 Guangzhou–Kunming Expressway, an expressway in China
- Beijing–Hong Kong high-speed train, train service operated by China Railway
