= Olympus M.Zuiko Digital ED 8 mm f/1.8 Fisheye Pro =

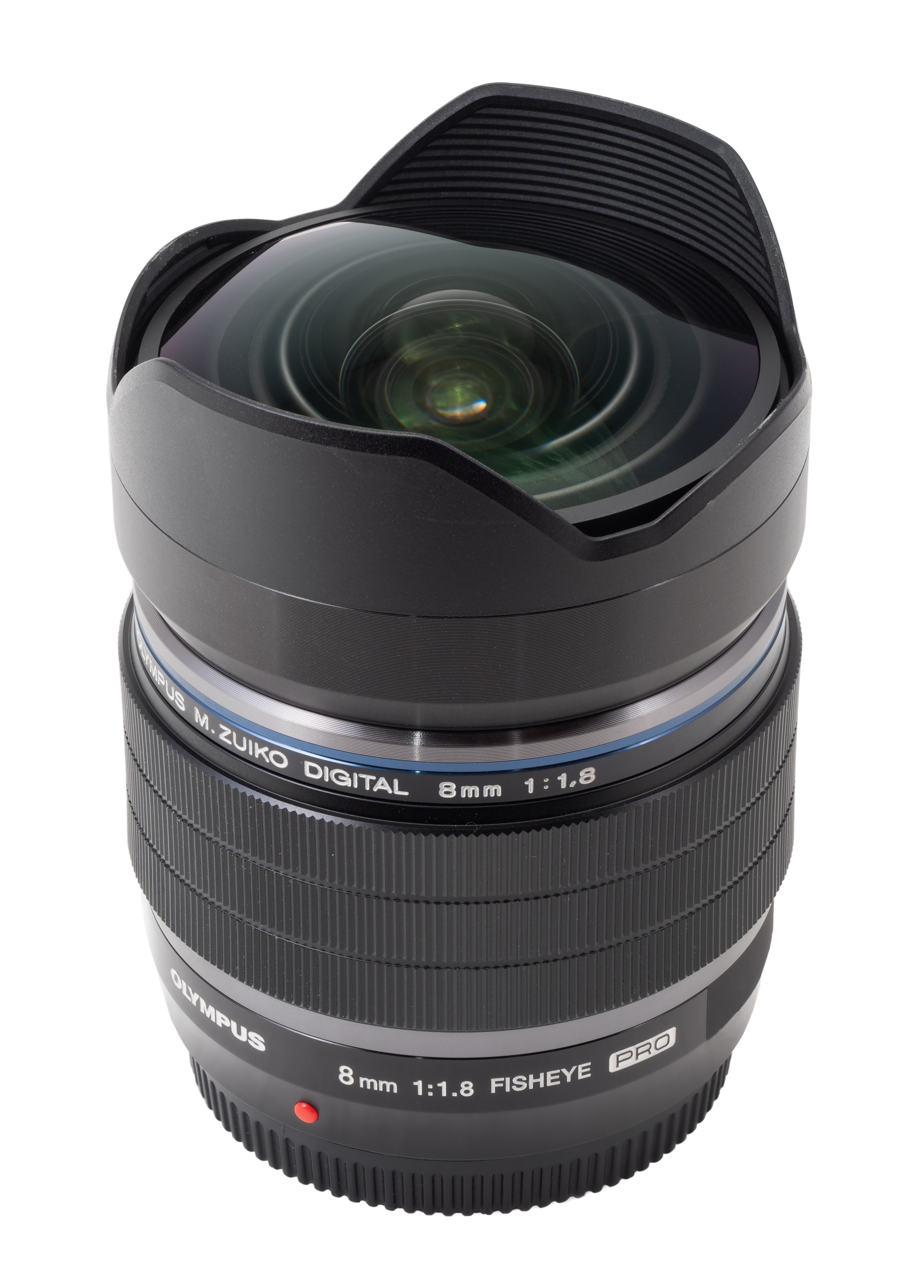
- Maker: Olympus
- Lens mount: Micro Four Thirds

Technical data
- Type: fisheye
- Focus drive: stepper
- Focal length: 8 mm
- Focal length (35mm equiv.): 16 mm
- Crop factor: 2
- Aperture (max/min): f/1.8 / f/22
- Close focus distance: 0.12 m
- Max. magnification: 0.2
- Diaphragm blades: 7, circular
- Construction: 17 elements in 15 groups

Features
- Ultrasonic motor: Yes Yes
- Weather-sealing: Yes Yes
- Lens-based stabilization: No No
- Macro capable: Yes Yes
- Unique features: aspheric, very fast
- Application: panorama

Physical
- Max. length: 80 mm
- Diameter: 62 mm
- Weight: 315 g

Accessories
- Lens hood: integrated

History
- Introduction: 2015

Olympus M.Zuiko Digital ED 8 mm f/1.8 Fisheye Pro is an optically corrected fisheye lens.

== Description ==
M.Zuiko Digital lenses are offered as exchangeable lenses for the Micro Four Thirds system (MFT). The ED 8 mm f/1.8 Fisheye Pro is available since 2014. This lens has a focussing ring and it is water and dust proof.

The anti-reflective coating of the lens with 0.3 times normal focal length has 17 lenses in 15 groups. The front lens is made of extremely high refracting glass in order to allow a small construction. The ED 8 mm f/1.8 Fisheye Pro has an excellent image quality with low aberration. At fast aperture sizes (up to f = 2.8) there is visible vignetting.

Owing to the large aperture size the lens is suitable for night sky and together with an underwater lens port for underwater photography. Furthermore, it is qualified for architecture and nature photography. Because of the short close focus distance it can be used for macro shots.

== Comparison ==
Compared to other camera systems with differing normal focal lengths, and therefore different image sensor sizes, the following equivalent values apply to lenses with appropriate properties as the M.Zuiko 8 mm f/1,8 within the Micro-Four-Thirds system (MFT). With the parameters given in the table in all camera systems the photographer will get the same angle of view, depth of field, diffraction limitation and motion blur:

Image sensor format	Focal lengths at the same angle of view (diagonal angle ≈ 29°)	F-number at the same depth of field	ISO speed at the same exposure time
Nikon CX	5.5 mm	1.2	100
MFT	8 mm	1.8	200
APS-C	11 mm	2.4	360
Full frame	16 mm	3.5	800
