= Panasonic Leica DG Vario-Elmar 100-400 mm =

Digital compact telephoto zoom lens

Panasonic Leica DG Vario-Elmar 100-400 mm F4,0–6,3 Asph. / Power O.I.S.
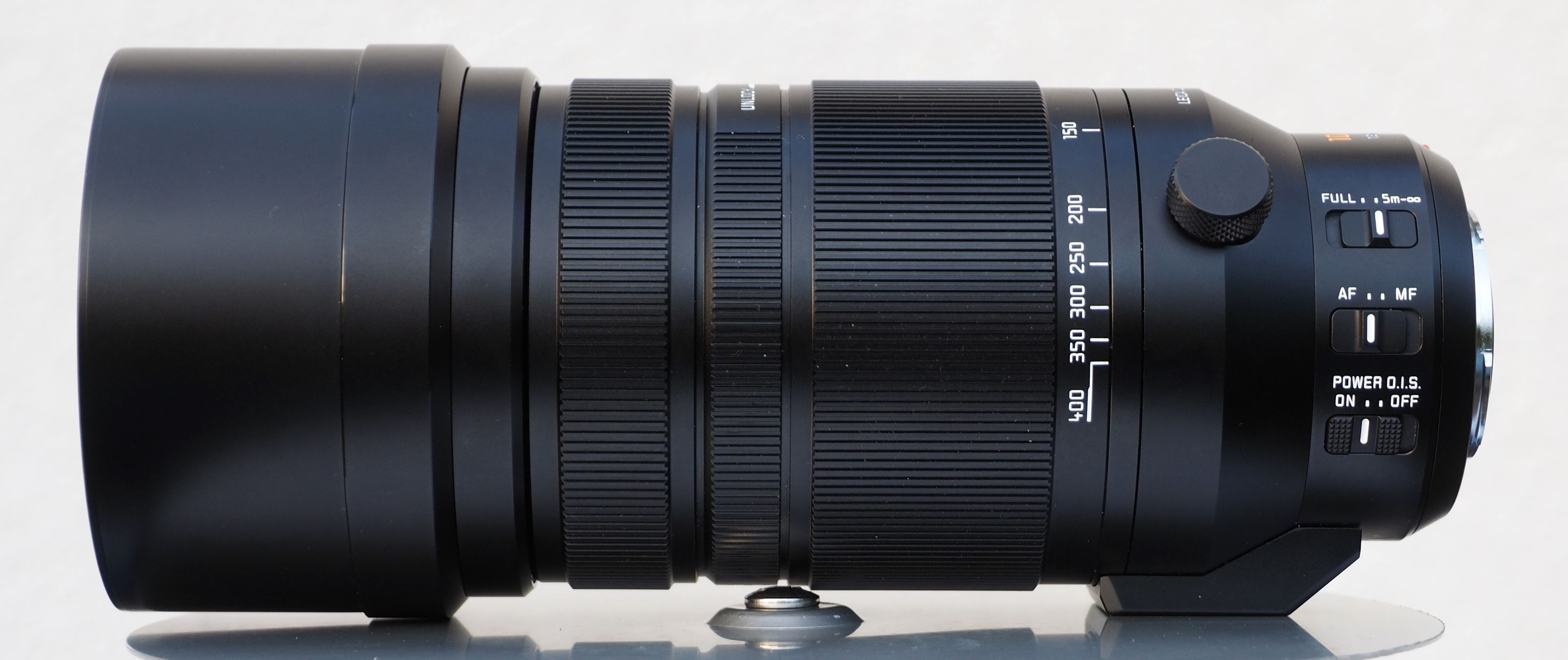
- Maker: Panasonic
- Lens mount: Micro Four Thirds

Technical data
- Type: tele zoom
- Focus drive: stepper
- Focal length: 100-400 mm
- Focal length (35mm equiv.): 200-800 mm
- Crop factor: 2
- Aperture (max/min): f/4.0-f/6.3 / f/22
- Close focus distance: 1.3 m
- Max. magnification: 0.25
- Diaphragm blades: 9, circular
- Construction: 20 elements in 13 groups

Features
- Ultrasonic motor: Yes Yes
- Weather-sealing: Yes Yes
- Lens-based stabilization: Yes Yes
- Macro capable: Yes Yes
- Unique features: aspheric / dual image stabilisation
- Application: wildlife / sports

Physical
- Min. length: 171.5 mm
- Diameter: 83 mm
- Weight: 985 g
- Filter diameter: 72 mm

Accessories
- Lens hood: included
- Case: included

History
- Introduction: 2016

The Panasonic Leica DG Vario-Elmar 100–400 mm f/4.0-f/6.3 lens is a digital compact telephoto zoom lens for Micro Four Thirds system cameras. It is a varifocal lens branded with the German label Leica, but is currently manufactured in China by Panasonic. Previously it was made in Japan.

== Description ==
It is the autofocus lens with the smallest field of view of the Micro Four Thirds (MFT) system (end of 2016). Its weight is less than one kilogramme, which allows easy transport and facilitates free-hand shooting.

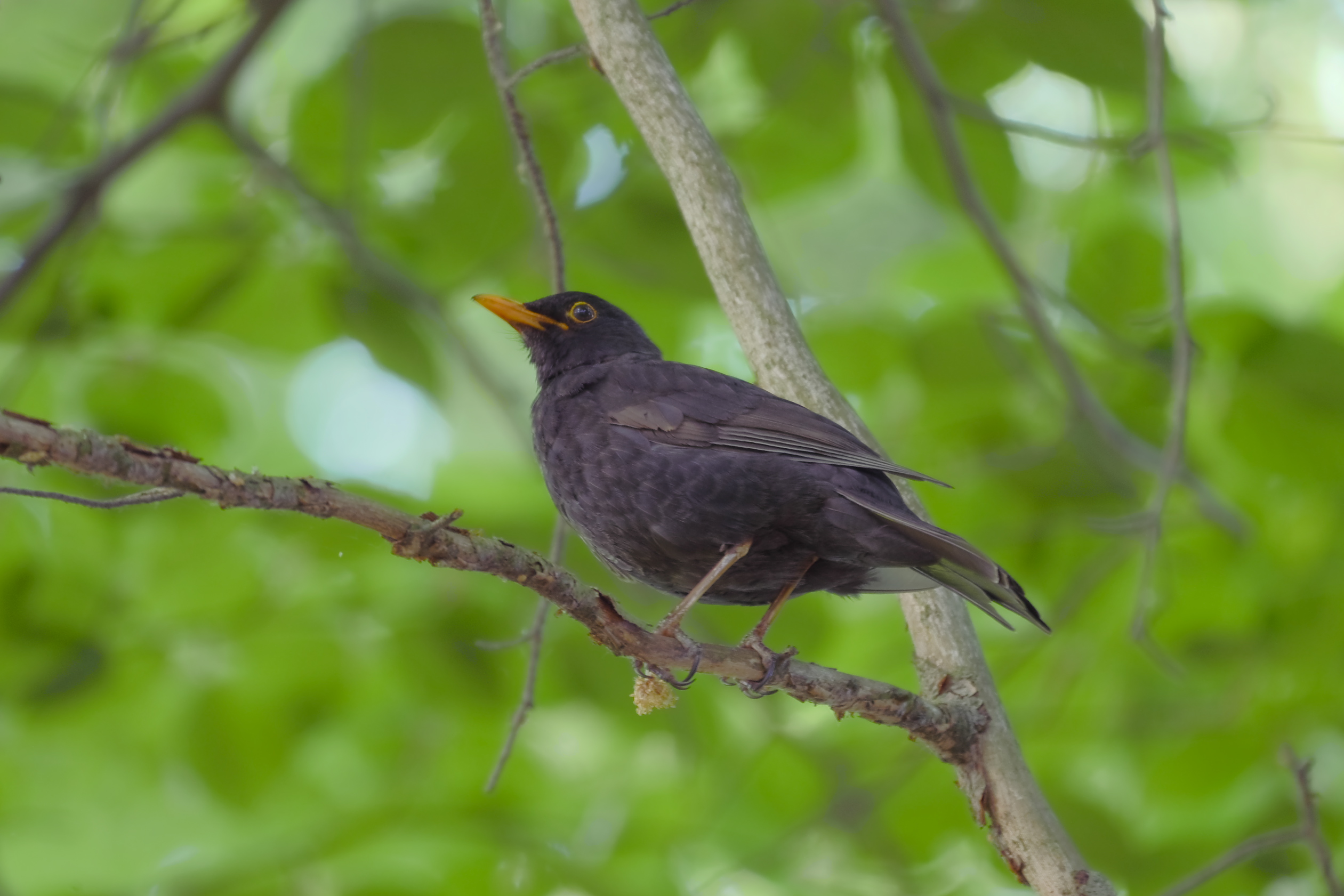
Common blackbird under the canopy of a tree taken free-hand at 400 mm focal length with an exposure time of 1/10 second

Its in-lens image stabilisation can be combined with in-camera-body image stabilisation in order to allow shots without a tripod, despite the very small field of view (between 12° and 3.1°). Even at maximum focal length it is possible to get sharp images taken free-hand with exposure times down to a tenth of a second. The lens's focusing is fast and precise even in low light conditions such as when photographing wildlife around dusk. Lens and camera body can communicate with a sample rate up to 240 images per second.

There is almost no distortion visible in shots taken at any focal length.

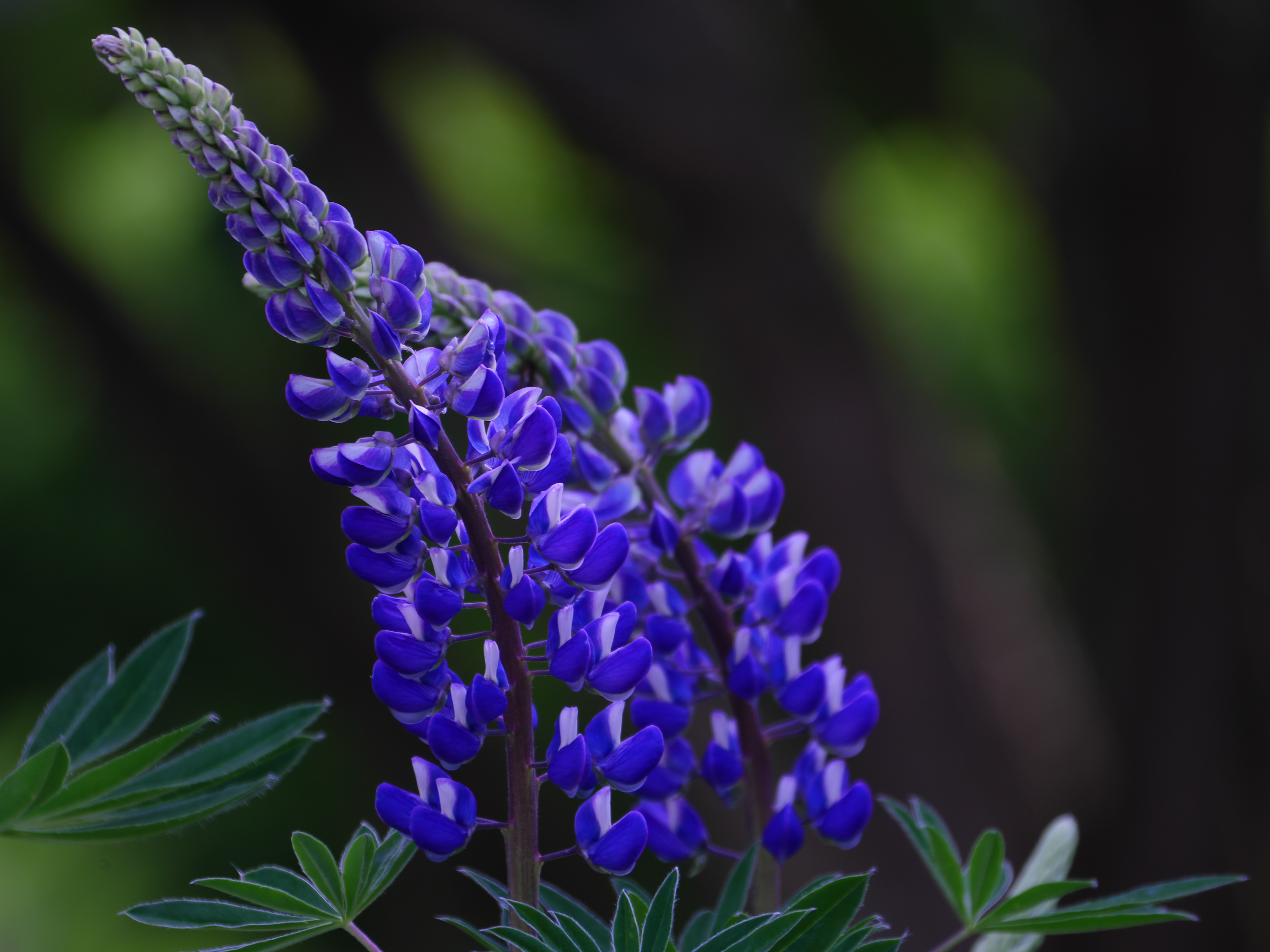
Macro shot of a Lupinus polyphyllus taken by the Leica DG at 400 mm focal length

Due to its narrow field of view and its relatively short close focus distance, it can also be used for macro shots from a distance of 1.3 metres or above.

The silent autofocus and the stepless aperture adjustment together with the high optical quality enable 4K resolution video shooting with this lens.

The lens has a small shiftable in-built lens hood and another bigger lens hood which can be attached to it and fixed via a thumb screw. Some critics have complained that there is no bayonet, which would allow faster attachment and detachment of the lens hood. However, under extreme backlight conditions the images of the telephoto lens can suffer from lens flare.

Due to the smaller image sensor size of the MFT system the depth of field is larger compared to full-frame sensor cameras if the lenses are operated at the same f-number.

== Comparison ==
Compared to other camera systems with differing normal focal lengths, and therefore different image sensor sizes, the following equivalent values apply to lenses with appropriate properties as the Leica DG 100–400 mm 6.3 in the MFT system. With the parameters given in the table in all camera systems the photographer will get the same angle of view, depth of field, diffraction limitation and motion blur:

Image sensor format	Focal lengths at the same angle of view (diagonal angle ≈ 3°)	F-number at the same depth of field	ISO speed at the same exposure time
Nikon CX	300 mm	4.5	100
MFT	400 mm	6.3	200
APS-C	530 mm	8.4	360
Full frame	800 mm	12.6	800
