= Kodak Pixpro S-1 =

2014 Micro Four Thirds mirrorless camera

Overview
- Maker: JK Imaging

Lens
- Lens mount: Micro Four Thirds

Sensor/medium
- Sensor type: CMOS
- Sensor size: 17.3 x 13mm (Four Thirds type)
- Maximum resolution: 4640 x 3480 (16 megapixels)
- Film speed: 200-12800
- Recording medium: SD/SDHC/SDXC

Focusing
- Focus areas: 49 focus points

Shutter
- Shutter speeds: 1/4000s to 30s
- Continuous shooting: 5 frames per second

Image processing
- White balance: Yes

General
- LCD screen: 3 inches with 920,000 dots
- Dimensions: 116 x 68 x 36mm (4.57 x 2.68 x 1.42 inches)
- Weight: 290 g (10 oz) including battery

The Kodak Pixpro S-1 is a rangefinder-styled digital mirrorless camera announced on January 7, 2014, and first shipped in August 2014. It is the first interchangeable lens camera made under the Kodak brand since JK Imaging bought the rights to "manufacture and sell Kodak branded digital imaging products", as described in promotional materials. Kodak is one of the original members of the Micro Four Thirds standard but had never before produced a camera for it. The camera is produced in partnership with Asia Optical.

The entry level Kodak Pixpro S-1 is the competitor of Olympus PEN E-PL5 and Panasonic Lumix DMC-GF6 and comes with dual kit lenses SZ ED 12-45mm f/3.5-6.3 AF zoom and SZ ED 42.5-160mm f/3.9-5.9 AF telezoom. JK Imaging also launched SL 400mm F6.7 Fieldscope lenses around the same time. The first lens is not so compact as other manufacturer's lenses, but has advantages with dual kit lenses, has time lapse, also for video, built-in image stabilization and 360 degrees panorama. Being a Micro Four Thirds camera, the S-1 is also compatible with all other lenses within that system, but not for the accessories, such flash, etc.

== See also ==
- Kodak PixPro AZ521

Brand	Form	Class	2008	2009	2010	2011			2012	2013	2014	2015	2016	2017	2018	2019	2020	2021	2022	2023	2024	25
Olympus	SLR style OM-D	Professional															E-M1X ^{R}					
Olympus	SLR style OM-D	High-end									E-M1			E-M1 II ^{R}			E-M1 III ^{R}					
Olympus	SLR style OM-D	Advanced							E-M5			E-M5 II ^{R}					E-M5 III ^{R}					
Olympus	SLR style OM-D	Mid-range									E-M10		E-M10 II		E-M10 III			E-M10 IV				
Olympus	Rangefinder style PEN	Mid-range		E-P1	E-P2		E-P3				E-P5		PEN-F ^{R}									
Olympus	Rangefinder style PEN	Upper-entry			E-PL1	E-PL2		E-PL3	E-PL5		E-PL6	E-PL7		E-PL8	E-PL9		E-PL10					
Olympus	Rangefinder style PEN	Entry-level					E-PM1		E-PM2													
Olympus	remote													Air								
OM System	SLR style	Professional																	OM-1 ^{R}		OM-1 II ^{R}	
OM System	SLR style	High-end																				OM-3 ^{R}
OM System	SLR style	Advanced																		OM-5 ^{R}		
OM System	PEN	Mid-range																	E-P7			
Panasonic	SLR style	High-end Video													GH5S				GH6 ^{R}			GH7 ^{R}
Panasonic	SLR style	High-end Photo													G9 ^{R}						G9 II ^{R}	
Panasonic	SLR style	High-end		GH1		GH2			GH3		GH4				GH5				GH5II			
Panasonic	SLR style	Mid-range		G1	G2		G3		G5		G6		G7	G80/G85			G90/G95					
Panasonic	SLR style	Entry-level			G10													G100			G100D	
Panasonic	Rangefinder style	Advanced							GX1		GX7		GX8		GX9							
Panasonic	Rangefinder style	Mid-range									GM1	GM5	GX80/GX85									
Panasonic	Rangefinder style	Entry-level			GF1	GF2	GF3		GF5		GF6	GF7	GF8	GX800/GX850/GF9		GX880/GF10/GF90						
Panasonic	Camcorder	Professional							AG-AF104													
Kodak	Rangefinder style	Entry-level										S-1										
DJI	Drone	.												Zenmuse X5S								
DJI	Drone	.												Zenmuse X5								
YI	Rangefinder style	Entry-level												M1								
Yongnuo	Rangefinder style	Android camera															YN450M		YN455			
Blackmagic Design	Rangefinder style	High-End Video							Cinema Camera													
Blackmagic Design	Rangefinder style	High-End Video									Pocket Cinema Camera					Pocket Cinema Camera 4K						
Blackmagic Design		High-End Video										Micro Cinema Camera									Micro Studio Camera 4K G2	
Z CAM	Cinema	Advanced											E1			E2						
Z CAM	Cinema	Mid-Range																E2-M4				
Z CAM	Cinema	Entry-Level															E2C					
JVC	Camcorder	Professional										GY-LS300										
SVS-Vistek		Industrial							EVO Tracer													
