= Panasonic Lumix DMC-G85/G80 =

Panasonic Lumix DMC-G8/G80/G85
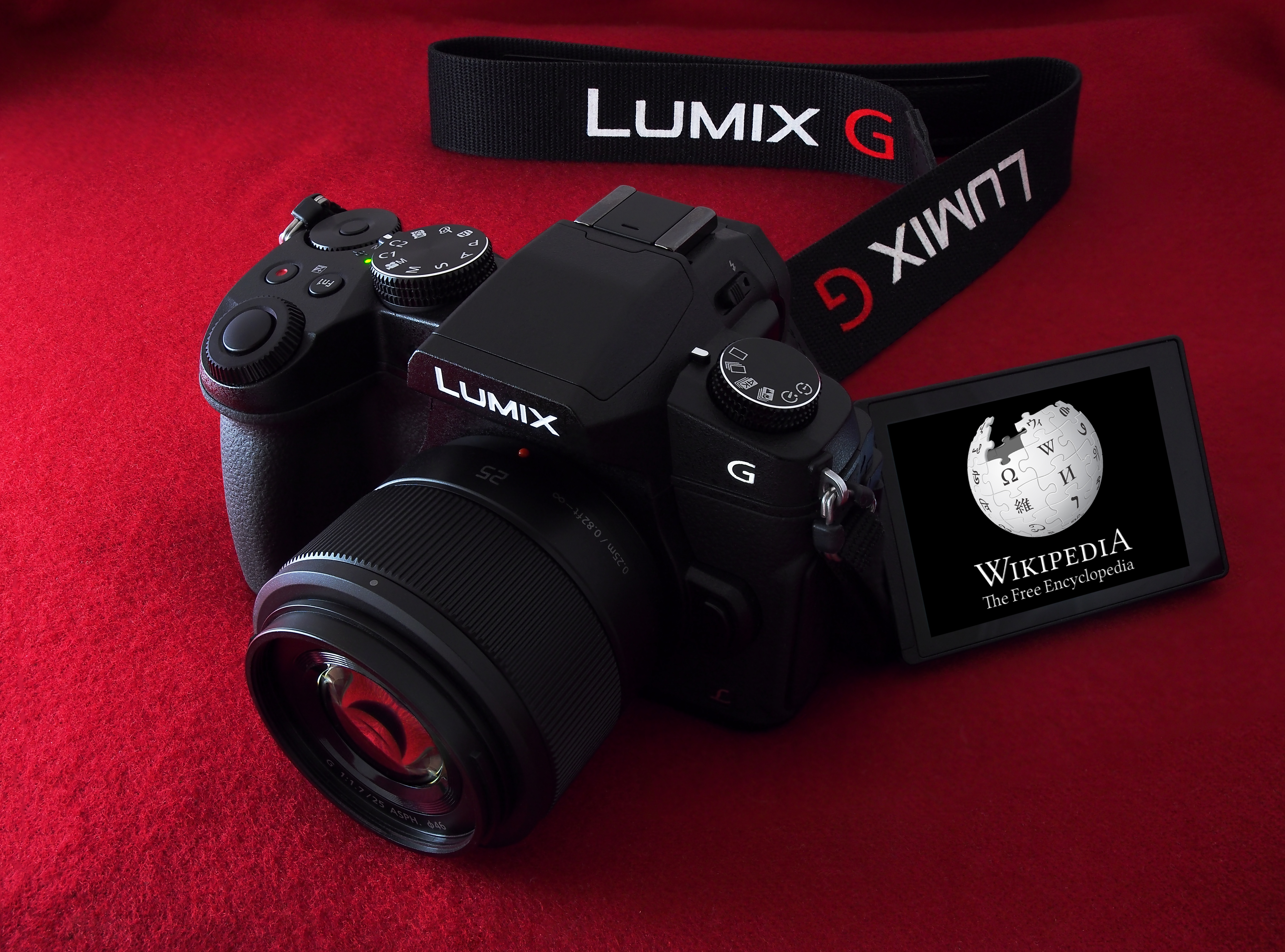

Overview
- Maker: Panasonic Holdings Corporation
- Type: Micro Four Thirds system

Lens
- Lens: Micro Four Thirds system mount

Sensor/medium
- Sensor: 4/3 type MOS ('Live MOS sensor'), no AA filter
- Sensor size: 17.3 x 13 mm, Four Thirds Live MOS
- Maximum resolution: 4592 x 3448 (16.0 megapixels)
- Storage media: SD Memory Card, SDHC Memory Card, SDXC Memory Card/(Compatible with UHS-I / UHS-II UHS Speed Class 3 standard SDHC / SDXC Memory Cards)

Focusing
- Focus modes: Contrast Detect (sensor), Multi-area, Center, Selective single-point, Tracking, Single, Continuous, Touch, Face Detection, Live View

Exposure/metering
- Exposure modes: Aperture priority, Shutter, Program AE, Manual (w/ Focus Peaking), iAuto, Bulb, Time, Scene Select, Art Filter
- Metering modes: Multiple, Center-Weighted, Spot

Flash
- Flash: built-in flash, hot-shoe on the body; Auto, Auto/Red-eye Reduction, Forced On, Forced On/Red-eye Reduction, Slow Sync., Slow Sync./Red-eye Reduction, Forced Off

Shutter
- Shutter: Mechanical shutter / Electronic shutter
- Shutter speed range: 60 – 1/4000 sec. / 1/16000 sec (electronic)
- Continuous shooting: 9.0 fps

Viewfinder
- Viewfinder: built-in 2,360,000 (w/ Auto Luminance, 100% coverage)

Image processing
- White balance: 5 presets, with custom modes

General
- Video recording: AVCHD (Audio format: Dolby Digital 2ch), MP4 (Audio format: AAC 2ch): 3840 x 2160 @ 30p / 100 Mbps, MP4, H.264, AAC; 3840 x 2160 @ 24p / 100 Mbps, MP4, H.264, AAC; 1920 x 1080 @ 60p / 28 Mbps, MP4, H.264, AAC; 1920 x 1080 @ 60i / 17 Mbps, AVCHD, MTS, H.264, Dolby Digital; 1920 x 1080 @ 30p / 24 Mbps, AVCHD, MTS, H.264, Dolby Digital; 1920 x 1080 @ 30p / 20 Mbps, MP4, H.264, AAC; 1920 x 1080 @ 24p / 24 Mbps, AVCHD, MTS, H.264, Dolby Digital
- LCD screen: Fully articulated 3 inch, 1,040,000 dots
- Battery: DMW-BLC12E lithium-ion (1200mAh) (CIPA 330)
- Dimensions: 128×89×74 mm (5.0×3.5×2.9 in)
- Weight: Approx. 505 g (17.8 oz)

The Panasonic Lumix DMC-G85/G80 (DMC-G81 in Germany) is a mid-level DSLR-styled Micro Four Thirds mirrorless camera announced on September 19, 2016. The follow-up to the Panasonic Lumix DMC-G7, its main improvements are a weather-sealed body, an upgraded electronic viewfinder, no recording limit (Only G85, USA version) and the addition of 5-axis in-body image stabilization which works together with lens stabilization and a Post Focus function. Like the G7, movies can be recorded in 4K resolution at 100 mbs. The G85/G80 body weighs 90g more than its predecessor.

== Specifications ==
- Magnesium alloy front panel
- Focus-bracketing
- Post Focus image (developed by 4K movie)
- Combined Image stabilization (5-axis image stabilization, Dual I.S. with Panasonic lens: in-camera 5-axis image stabilization works in tandem with in-lens LUMIX I.S.)
- Wi-fi connectivity (Android, Apple); all functions and shooting can be operated by smartphone

=== Post Focus image ===
One of new capabilities is Post Focus. It works similarly to focus bracketing; in this case, the camera captures 8 megapixel images (4K video resolution), in which each frame has a different focal point. The images can be joined automatically on camera, or the user can choose which parts of the scene will be stacked together into one image. It can be used handsfree, but for better images (i.e. no mistakes at stacking) the use of tripod is recommended.

=== Focus Bracketing ===
For full resolution stacked images, the user can use the Focus Bracketing mode. In this mode, the user chooses how many shots will be taken and at what kind of step (between 1–5). Step 1 has smaller distance to other focal point than step 5.

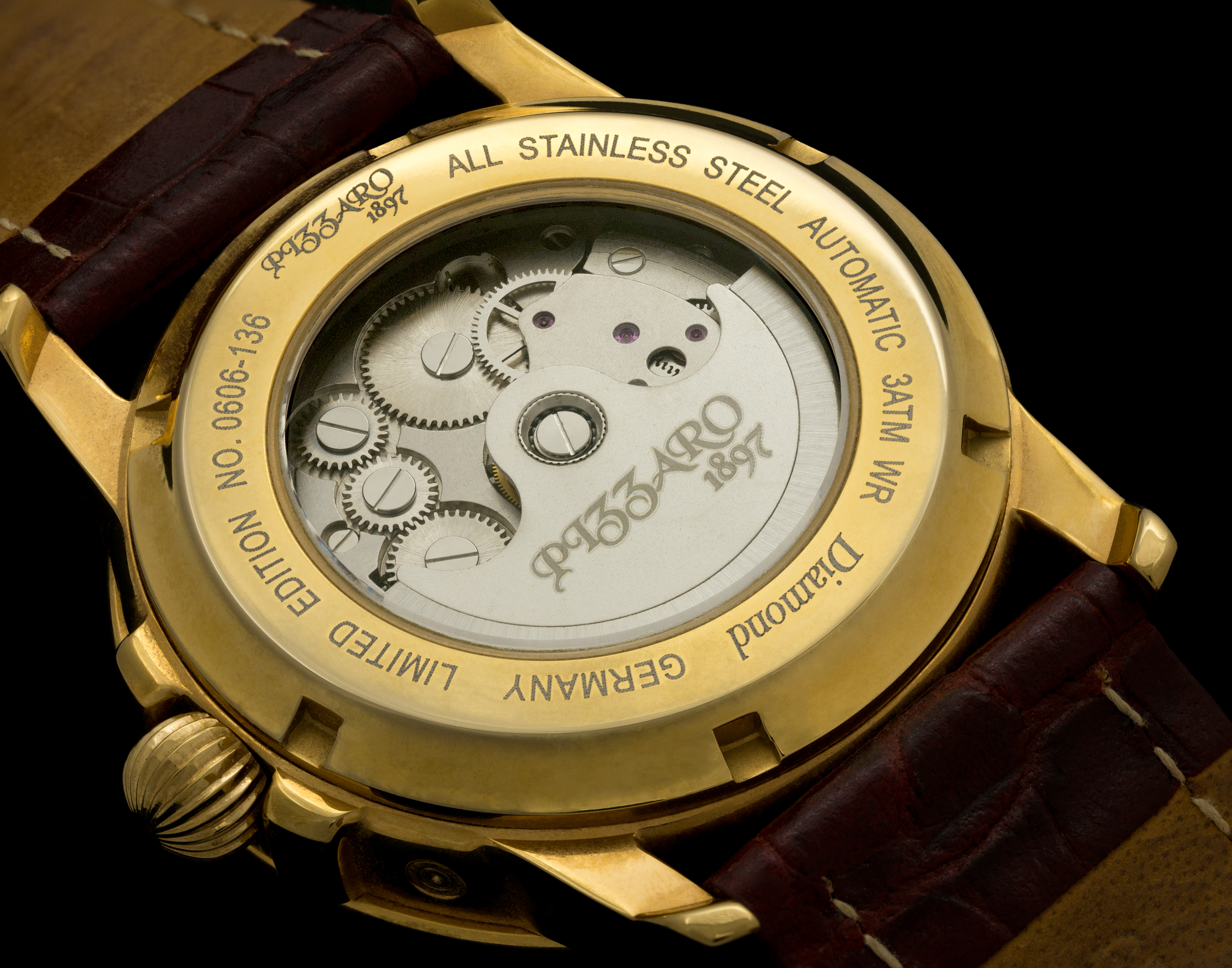
Macro image made with stacking of 15 images at step 1

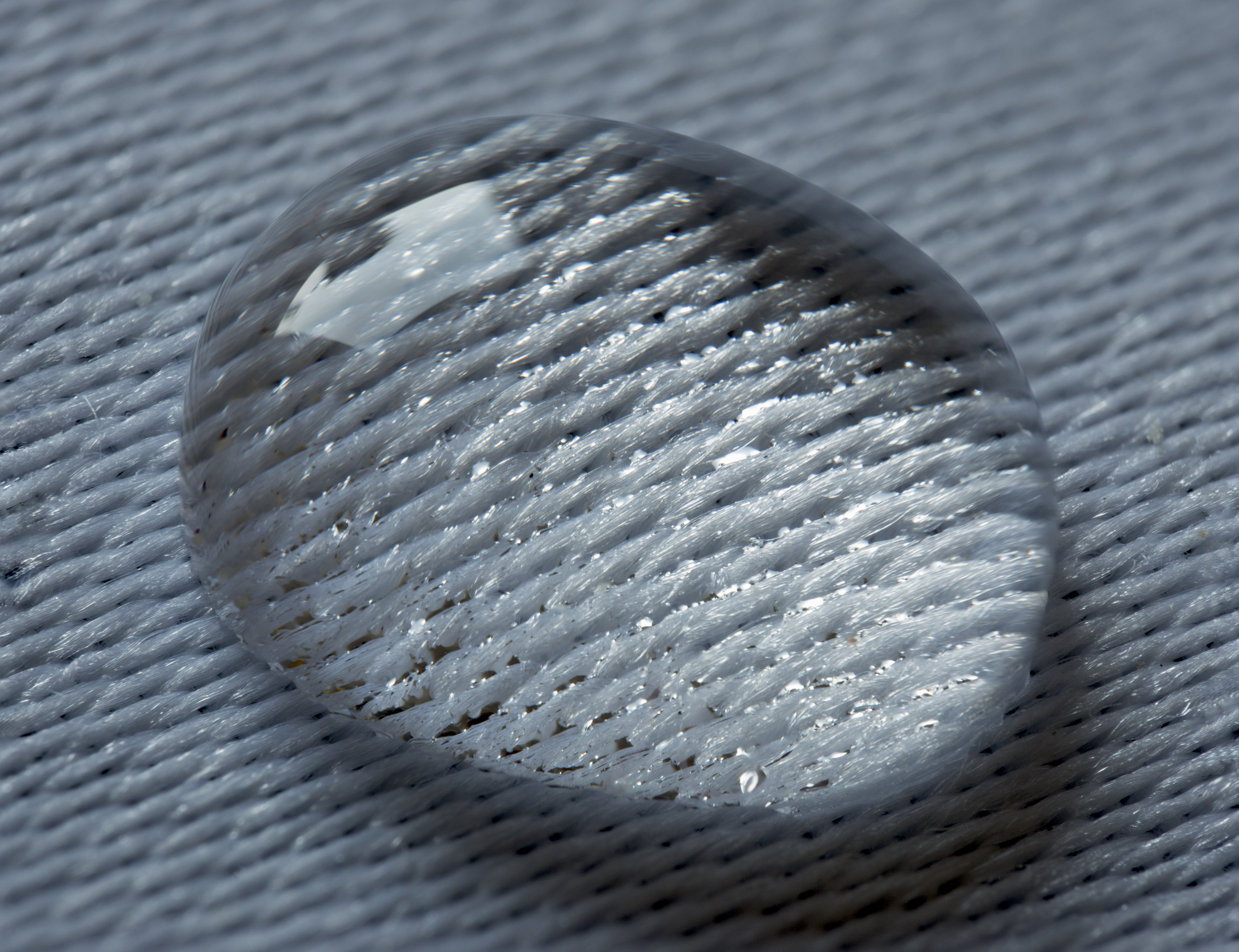
Macro image made with stacking of 24 images, step 5, Raynox 250

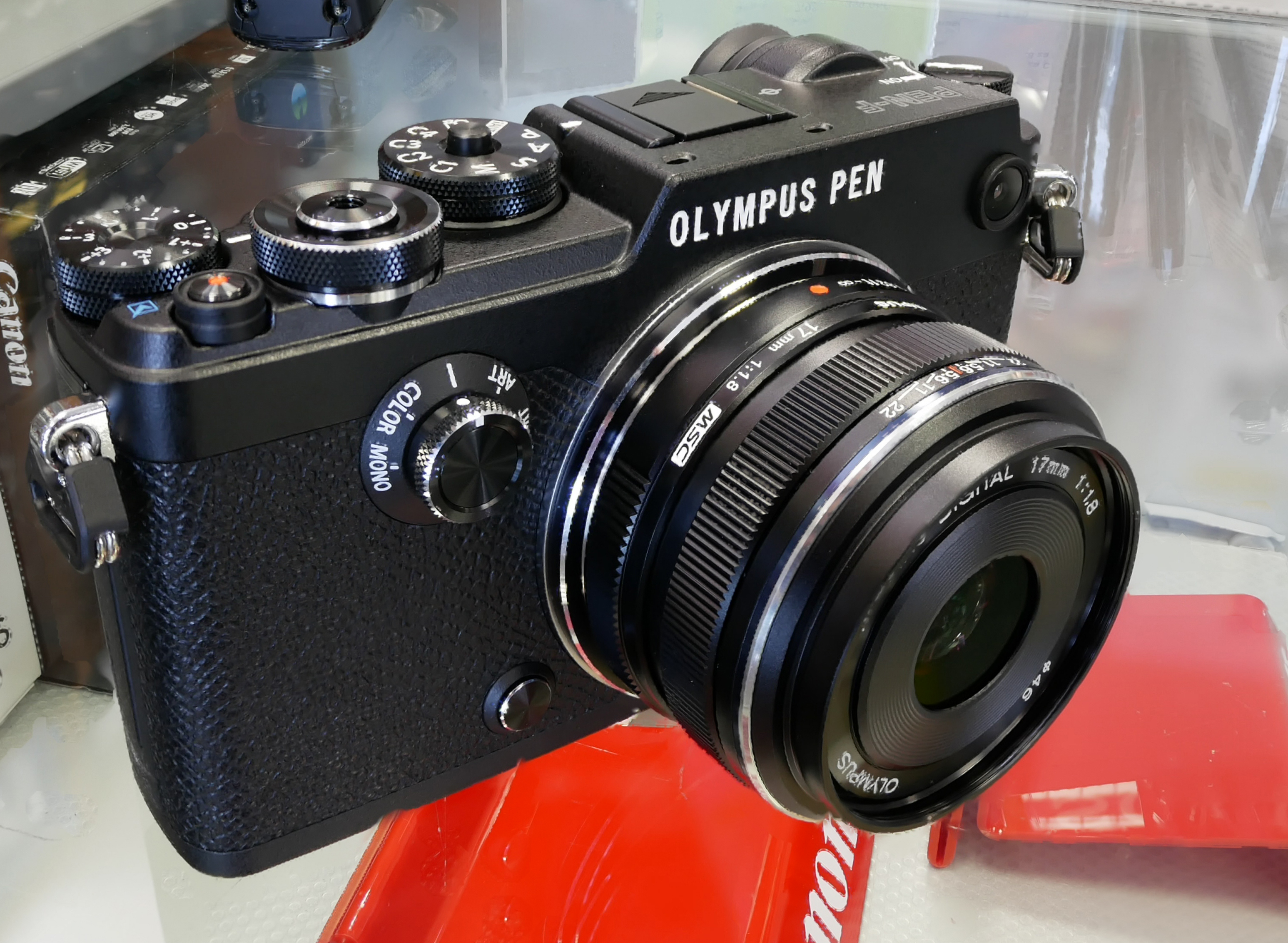
Handsfree image made with Post Focus function

Brand	Form	Class	2008	2009	2010	2011			2012	2013	2014	2015	2016	2017	2018	2019	2020	2021	2022	2023	2024	25
Olympus	SLR style OM-D	Professional															E-M1X ^{R}					
Olympus	SLR style OM-D	High-end									E-M1			E-M1 II ^{R}			E-M1 III ^{R}					
Olympus	SLR style OM-D	Advanced							E-M5			E-M5 II ^{R}					E-M5 III ^{R}					
Olympus	SLR style OM-D	Mid-range									E-M10		E-M10 II		E-M10 III			E-M10 IV				
Olympus	Rangefinder style PEN	Mid-range		E-P1	E-P2		E-P3				E-P5		PEN-F ^{R}									
Olympus	Rangefinder style PEN	Upper-entry			E-PL1	E-PL2		E-PL3	E-PL5		E-PL6	E-PL7		E-PL8	E-PL9		E-PL10					
Olympus	Rangefinder style PEN	Entry-level					E-PM1		E-PM2													
Olympus	remote													Air								
OM System	SLR style	Professional																	OM-1 ^{R}		OM-1 II ^{R}	
OM System	SLR style	High-end																				OM-3 ^{R}
OM System	SLR style	Advanced																		OM-5 ^{R}		
OM System	PEN	Mid-range																	E-P7			
Panasonic	SLR style	High-end Video													GH5S				GH6 ^{R}			GH7 ^{R}
Panasonic	SLR style	High-end Photo													G9 ^{R}						G9 II ^{R}	
Panasonic	SLR style	High-end		GH1		GH2			GH3		GH4				GH5				GH5II			
Panasonic	SLR style	Mid-range		G1	G2		G3		G5		G6		G7	G80/G85			G90/G95					
Panasonic	SLR style	Entry-level			G10													G100			G100D	
Panasonic	Rangefinder style	Advanced							GX1		GX7		GX8		GX9							
Panasonic	Rangefinder style	Mid-range									GM1	GM5	GX80/GX85									
Panasonic	Rangefinder style	Entry-level			GF1	GF2	GF3		GF5		GF6	GF7	GF8	GX800/GX850/GF9		GX880/GF10/GF90						
Panasonic	Camcorder	Professional							AG-AF104													
Kodak	Rangefinder style	Entry-level										S-1										
DJI	Drone	.												Zenmuse X5S								
DJI	Drone	.												Zenmuse X5								
YI	Rangefinder style	Entry-level												M1								
Yongnuo	Rangefinder style	Android camera															YN450M		YN455			
Blackmagic Design	Rangefinder style	High-End Video							Cinema Camera													
Blackmagic Design	Rangefinder style	High-End Video									Pocket Cinema Camera					Pocket Cinema Camera 4K						
Blackmagic Design		High-End Video										Micro Cinema Camera									Micro Studio Camera 4K G2	
Z CAM	Cinema	Advanced											E1			E2						
Z CAM	Cinema	Mid-Range																E2-M4				
Z CAM	Cinema	Entry-Level															E2C					
JVC	Camcorder	Professional										GY-LS300										
SVS-Vistek		Industrial							EVO Tracer													
