= Kodak PixPro AZ521 =

Lens
- Lens: 24-1248mm equivalent
- F-numbers: f/2.8-f/5.6 at the widest

Sensor/medium
- Sensor type: CMOS
- Sensor size: 1/2.33 inch type
- Maximum resolution: 4608 x 3456 (16 megapixels)
- Recording medium: SD or SDHC card

Focusing
- Focus modes: Auto, face detection, tracking

Shutter
- Shutter speeds: 1/2000s to 30s
- Continuous shooting: Full resolution at 9.6 frames per second, 4MP at 30 fps

Image processing
- White balance: Yes

General
- LCD screen: 3 inches with 460,000 dots
- Dimensions: 119×86×98 mm (4.7×3.4×3.9 in)
- Weight: 551 g (19 oz)

The Kodak PixPro AZ521 is a superzoom bridge camera under the Kodak brand. It was announced July 2013 and released in 2014 .

== Reviews ==
ePhotozine, in their review of the camera, wrote that they were "pleasantly surprised", and that the camera "packs a lot of features and takes decent pictures for a very fair price".

== See also ==
- Kodak PixPro S1
