= Jorge Almazán =

Spanish architect and author

Jorge Almazán Caballero
- Occupation: Associate Professor

Academic background
- Education: Technical University of Madrid (BArch); Tokyo Institute of Technology (PhD)

Academic work
- Institutions: Keio University

Jorge Almazán Caballero is a Spanish architect and author based in Tokyo, Japan. Almazán is an associate professor at Keio University and the founder of StudioLab, an architecture laboratory based at the university. Almazan is the author of Emergent Tokyo, a book that examines Tokyo's built form through 5 core typologies: Zakkyo buildings, yokocho alleyways, undertrack infills, ankyo streets, and dense low-rise neighborhoods. The book has characterized Tokyo, one of the world's largest cities, as simultaneously intimate and liveable as a result of its unique urban form.

== Publications ==
- Emergent Tokyo: Designing the Spontaneous City (2021)
