= Pedro Duque =

Spanish astronaut and politician (born 1963)

The Most Excellent Pedro Duque OF OMSE
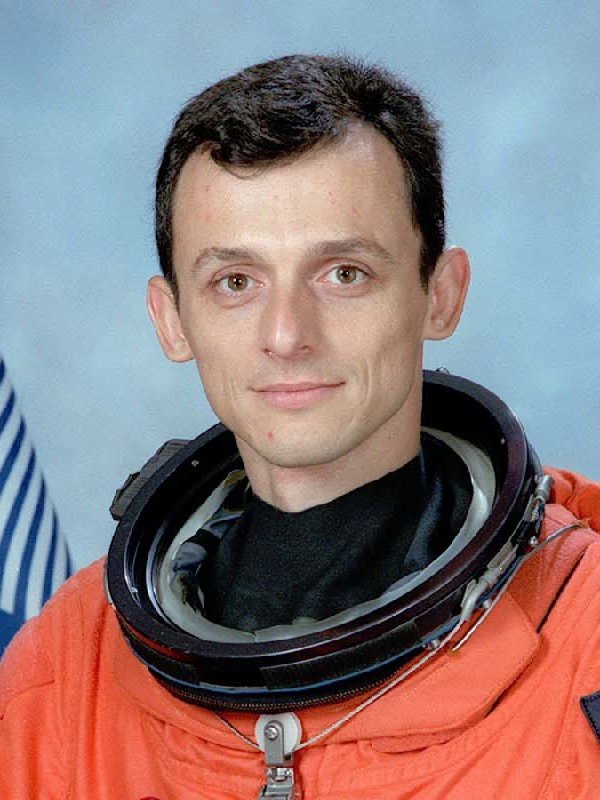
- Duque in January 2000

Minister of Science, Innovation and Universities
- In office 7 June 2018 – 12 July 2021
- Prime Minister: Pedro Sánchez
- Preceded by: Position established
- Succeeded by: Diana Morant

Member of the Congress of Deputies
- In office 21 May 2019 – 21 February 2020
- Succeeded by: Lázaro Azorín
- Constituency: Alicante

Personal details
- Born: 14 March 1963 (age 63) Madrid, Spain
- Party: Independent
- Occupation: Flight engineer
- Awards: Grand Cross of Aeronautical Merit; Prince of Asturias Award for International Cooperation; Member of the Order of Friendship (Russian Federation); Medal "For Merit in Space Exploration"
- Space career

ESA astronaut
- Status: Retired
- Time in space: 18d 18h 46min
- Selection: 1992 ESA Group/NASA Group 16 (1996)
- Mission: STS-95, Soyuz TMA-3/2
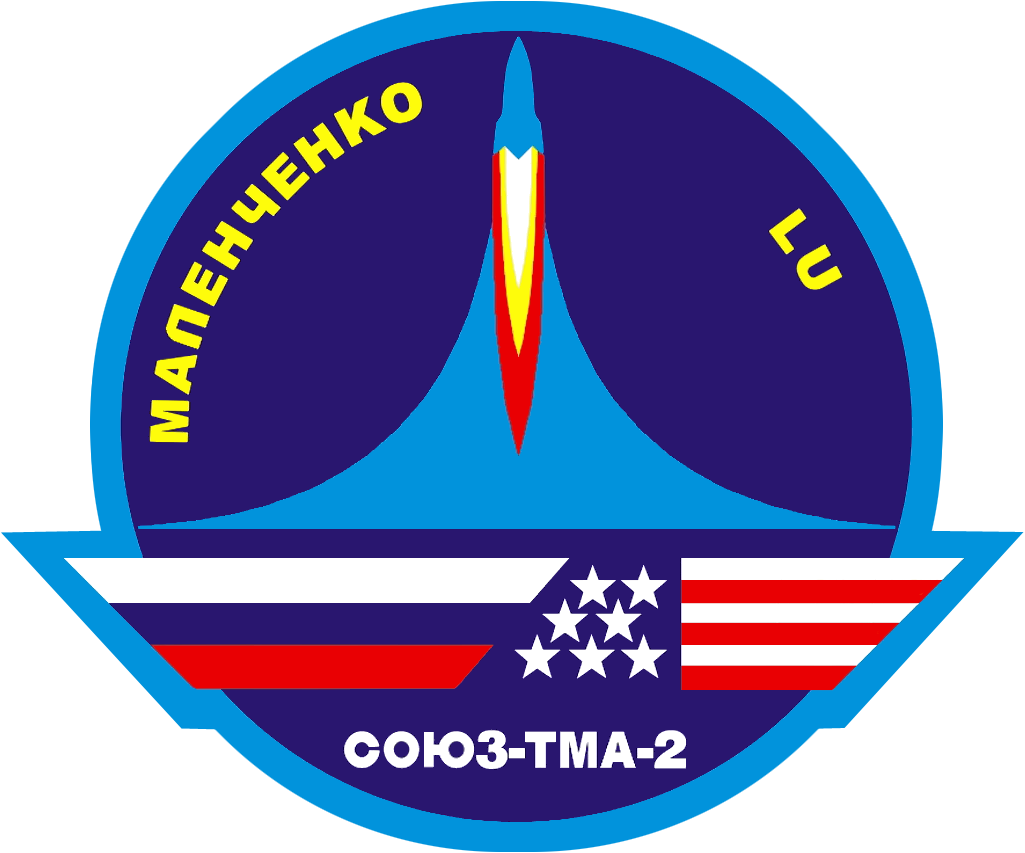
- Mission insignia

Pedro Francisco Duque Duque, OF, OMSE (born Madrid, 14 March 1963) is a Spanish astronaut and aeronautics engineer who served as Minister of Science from 2018 to 2021 and member of the Congress of Deputies, representing Alicante, from May 2019 until February 2020.

Since December 2023, he has been the chair of Hispasat.

== Biography ==
=== Early life and education ===
He was born in Madrid in 1963. His father was an air traffic controller and his mother a school teacher; both were from Badajoz. In 1986, Duque earned a degree in aeronautical engineering from the Universidad Politécnica de Madrid. In 1986, he worked for GMV and for the European Space Agency (ESA) for six years before being selected as a candidate to become an astronaut in 1992.

=== Astronaut ===
Duque underwent training in both Russia and the United States. His first spaceflight was as a mission specialist aboard Space Shuttle mission STS-95, during which Duque supervised ESA experimental modules. In October 2003, Duque visited the International Space Station on board a Soyuz TMA Ship for several days during a crew changeover. The name designated by ESA/Spain for the scientific program of this visit was Misión Cervantes.

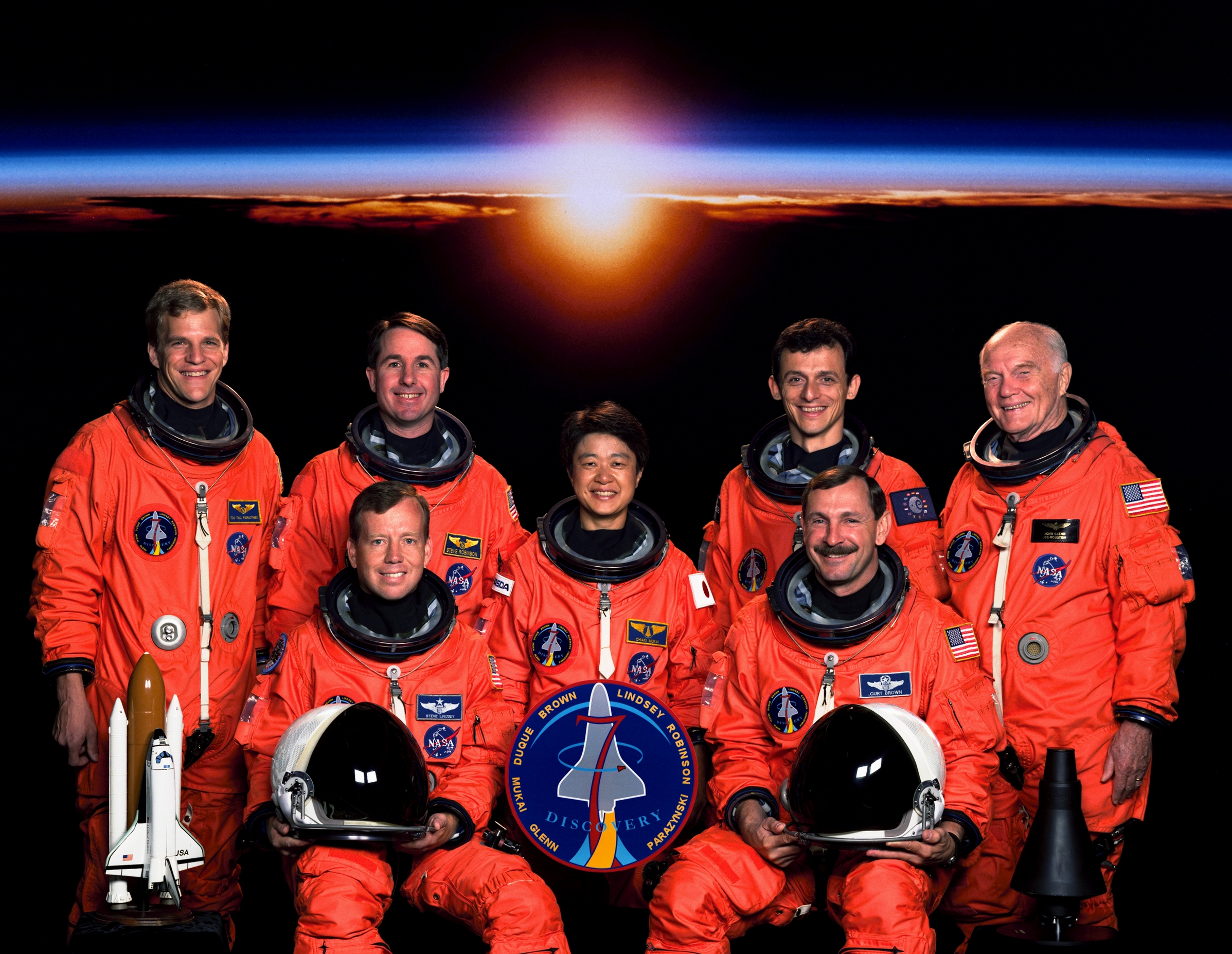
Duque (standing, second from the right) with the crew of the STS-95 in 1998

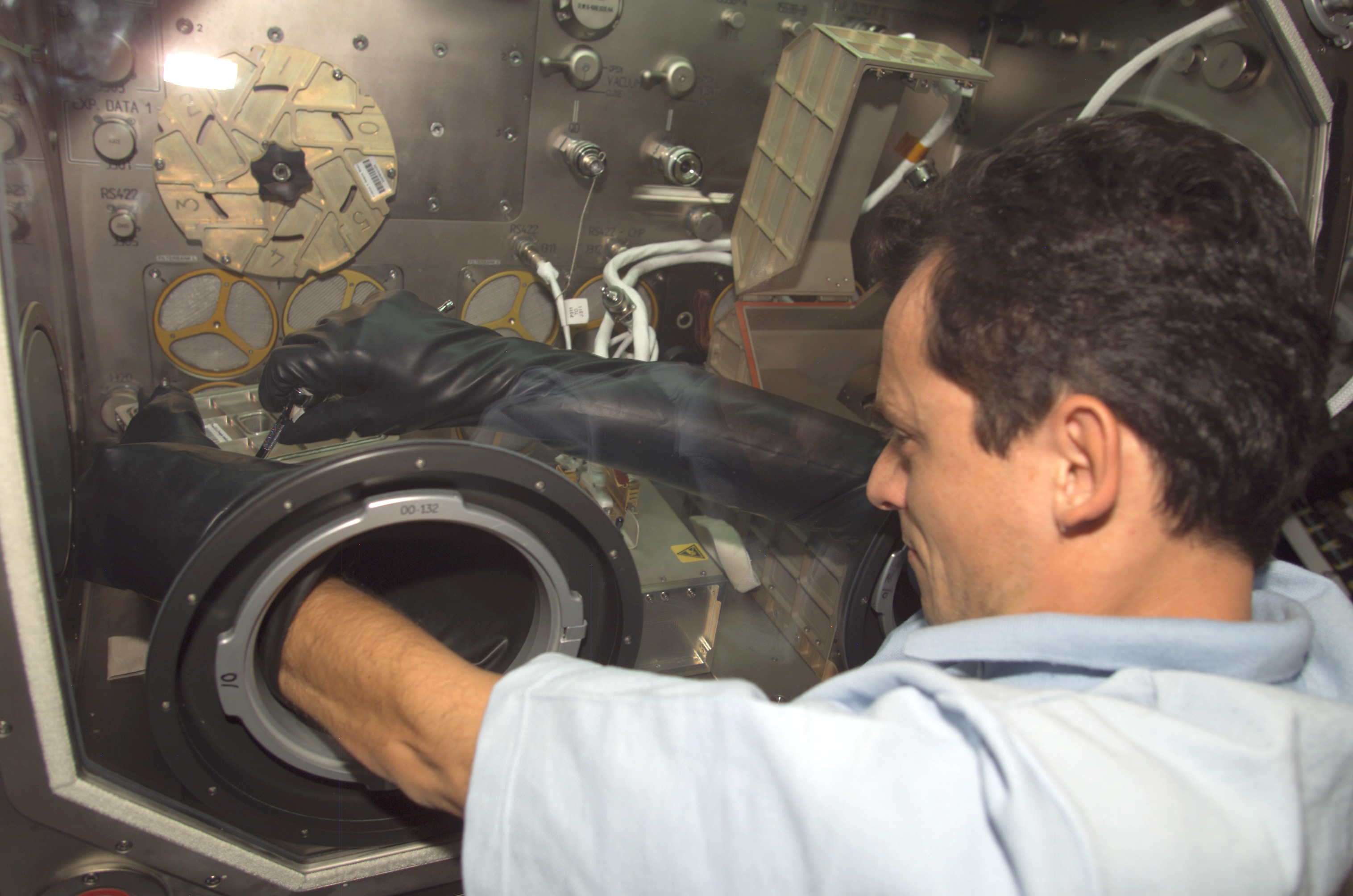
Duque working on a glovebox while aboard the International Space Station during Expedition 8

=== University and business ===
In 2003, he started working at UPM School of Aeronautical Engineers as head of operations of the Spanish USOC, also lecturing students on space science and operations.

In 2006, Duque was named managing director (CEO) of Deimos Imaging, a private company, that in 2009 put in orbit the first Spanish earth observation satellite (Deimos 1) for application in agriculture, forestry wildfire detection and control. In 2011, he was named executive president of the company.

=== Return to the ESA ===
In October 2011, Duque returned to his position at the European Space Agency, reprising his role as an astronaut. Until 2015, he was the leader of the Flight Operations Office, with responsibility for ESA operations in the ISS. In 2016, Duque participated in ESA CAVES training. After that he assumed responsibility for the review of future ESA crewed flights, within the ESA's astronaut corps.

=== Minister ===
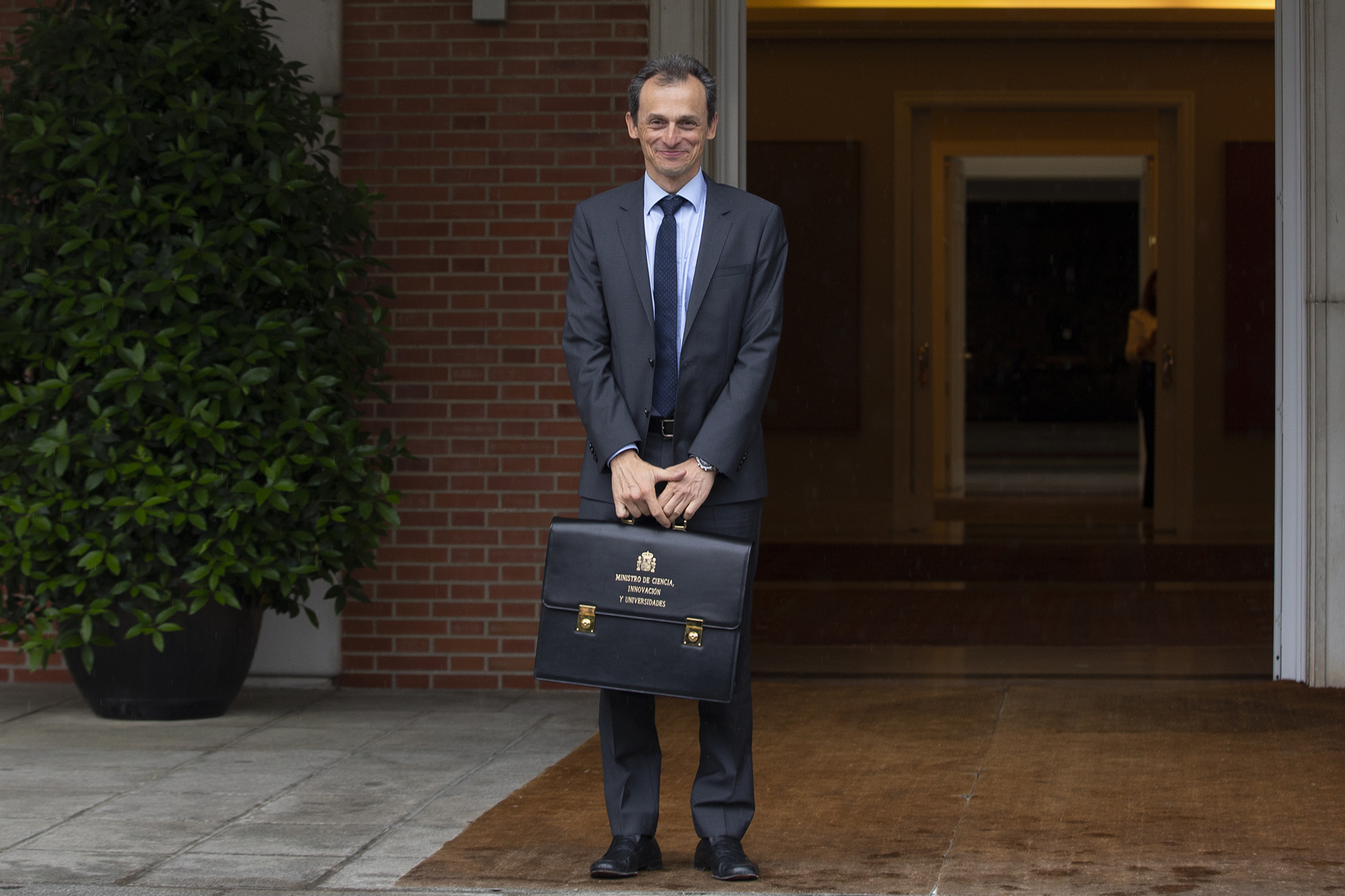
Duque photographed in 2018 in La Moncloa with his minister portfolio.

After the success of the June 2018 vote of no confidence in the government of Mariano Rajoy, Pedro Sánchez, leader of the new government, named Duque Minister of Science, Innovation and Universities.

In April 2019, Duque announced that his ministry was going to increase Spain's contribution to the European Space Agency by €701 million between 2020 and 2026 to ensure an appropriate contribution commensurate with the size of the Spanish economy.

Alongside the rest of the Sánchez cabinet, Duque ran for the April 2019 and November 2019 general elections, being elected MP for Alicante. In January 2020, Sánchez confirmed Duque as minister of Science and Innovation, with responsibility for university affairs being granted to Manuel Castells, as the first minister of Universities. He resigned as an MP on 21 February 2020, shortly after being confirmed as minister of Science.

In May 2022, he was appointed to the strategic committee of Destinus as an advisor. The company founded by serial entrepreneur Mikhail Kokorich is developing a hypersonic liquid hydrogen aircraft.

In December 2023, he was appointed as chair of Hispasat.

== Honors and decorations ==
- Order Of Friendship of the Russian Federation (1995)
- Grand Cross of Aeronautical Merit (1999)
- Prine of Asturias Award of International Cooperation (1999)
- Doctor Honoris Causa of the Technical University of Valencia (2005)
- Medal "For Merit in Space Exploration" of the Russian federation (2011)
- Doctor Honoris Causa of the European University of Madrid (2013)
- Doctor Honoris Causa of the National University of Distance Education (2016)
- Doctor Honoris Causa of the University of Almería

== See also ==
- Lists of astronauts
- List of Hispanic astronauts
