= Joel C. Sercel =

American aerospace engineer

Joel C. Sercel (/sərˈsɛl/; born 1960) is an American aerospace engineer and the inventor of several groundbreaking space technologies. His notable inventions include the Omnivore Thruster, Optical Mining, Radiant Gas Dynamic Mining, Optimized Matched Filter Tracking, and the Sun Flower Power Tower.

The Omnivore Thruster is a propulsion technology designed for in-space transportation. Optical Mining is a technique for extracting raw materials from asteroids. Optimized Matched Filter Tracking comprises methods of image processing and observational techniques for identifying and tracking faint moving targets with digital cameras. Radiant Gas Dynamic Mining is a method for harvesting lunar water. The Sun Flower Power Tower is an architectural approach for capturing and converting solar power into electricity, particularly for use in polar lunar regions.

As of May 2024, Sercel's work and studies have resulted in forty-four published applications, leading to twenty-two US patents. Of these patents, twelve are assigned to his company Trans Astronautica Corporation, five to Momentus Space, and five to Tautachrome Inc.

In recognition of his contributions to space technology, asteroid (46308) Joel Sercel was named in his honor.

== Education ==
Sercel received a Bachelor of Science in Engineering Physics from the University of Arizona in 1984. He received his PhD and master's degrees in Mechanical Engineering from the California Institute of Technology with a thesis in plasma physics applied to space propulsion.

== Career ==
Sercel worked for fourteen years at Jet Propulsion Laboratory (1983–1997), being awarded by NASA for many advancements in space propulsion technologies, systems and space mission project management. While at JPL, he worked on the ideation of the NSTAR ion propulsion system used on the Dawn spacecraft. He taught space engineering courses at Caltech (1993–2008). In the period 2002–2005, he was the Chief Systems Engineer of the (Transformational Satellite Communications System) project, a military satellite system commissioned by the US Air Force and worth twenty-two billion dollars. In 2016, he served in the National Academy of Science Air Force Studies Board on "The Role of Experimentation Campaigns in the Air Force Innovation Life Cycle" and in the NASA ARM Formulation Assessment and Support Team (FAST). In 2019, Sercel acted as CTO of Momentus, a technological space company based in the Silicon Valley. Today Sercel is the Founder and CEO of Trans Astronautica Corporation, a Los Angeles based space technology company also known as TransAstra.

== Trans Astronautica Corporation ==
Sercel founded TransAstra in 2015, merging his studies and inventions, to build the necessary space infrastructure for transportation and resource mining in the Solar System. Under Sercel's guidance, engineers at TranAstra are working on the following:

- Apis (Asteroid Provided In-situ Supplies) Flight Systems, the fleet of spacecraft equipped with Optical Mining technology and the Omnivore Thruster system, working as honey bees to collect and transport resources harvested in space
- Optical Mining, a technology that enables the extraction of resources in space thanks to the use of concentrated sunlight
- Omnivore Thruster, an innovative propulsion technology which allows to use a multitude of fuel types, water included, to be used for in-space cargo transportation
- Sutter Asteroid Survey, a new kind of telescope developed for the discovery of new asteroids in real-time and the detection of their velocity and luminosity, using the Compound Synthetic Tracking
- Sutter Turnkey Observatory (TKO) a cutting-edge, self-contained observatory capable of housing up to 18 integrated telescopes. Constructed to be functional in any remote location with electrical power, it eliminates the need for existing observatory
- Beetle Lunar Rover, an electric powered rover aimed to harvest resources on the Moon or on Mars, thanks to a special technology called Radiant Gas Dynamic (RGD) mining, which allows to mine resources avoiding the problems of the classic mechanical digging operations
- Sun Flower Power Tower, a solar power generator, designed specifically to be used in the lunar poles, allowing to deliver megawatts of sunlight to support lunar mining operations
- FlyTrap, a new class of deployable capture bags that can be used in space to capture and control a wide range of objects ranging from orbital debris to asteroids.

== TransAstra SBIR/STTRs ==
Joel Sercel has been awarded multiple Small Business Innovation Research (SBIR) and Small Business Technology Transfer (STTR) grants. These grants have supported numerous projects, advancing innovative technologies in the field of aerospace engineering. Here are a list of some of the completed work.

SBIR Phase I

- Lunar Water Extractions Techniques and Systems (WETS), for NASA
- Sun Flower: Systems Design and Technology Maturation of a Sustainable Lunar Power Generation Architecture, for NASA
- Worker Bee™ Solar-Thermal Space Vehicle for Cislunar Mobility and Logistics, for United States Space Force

SBIR Ignite Phase I

- Capture Bag for Large Debris Remediation, for NASA

STTR Phase I

- Flytrap Multi-Object Capture Bag for End-of-Life (EOL) Disposal and Relocation to On-Orbit Depot for In-Space Servicing, Assembly, for United States Space Force
- Sutter™ Space Telescope System for Cislunar Space Domain Awareness (SDA), for United States Space Force

== NASA NIAC awards ==
Sercel was PI for seven of these received NASA Innovative Advanced Concepts (NIAC) Fellowships.

NIAC Phase I Awards:

- Making Soil for Space Habitats by Seeding Asteroids with Fungi
- Lunar-Polar Propellant Mining Outpost (LPMO): Affordable Exploration and Industrialization
- Sutter: Breakthrough Telescope Innovation for Asteroid Survey Missions to Start a Gold Rush in Space

NIAC Phase II Awards:

- Sutter Ultra: Breakthrough Space Telescope Mission Finds 320x More Asteroids Enabling Asteroid Mining, Human Exploration and Terminal Defense Against Incoming Asteroids (SUTTER)
- Lunar Polar Propellant Mining Outpost (LPMO): A Breakthrough for Lunar Exploration & Industry
- Optical Mining of Asteroids, Moons, and Planets to Enable Sustainable Human Exploration and Space Industrialization

NIAC Phase III Award:

- Mini Bee Prototype to Demonstrate the Apis Mission Architecture and Optical Mining Technology

== Trans Astronautica patents ==
- Optimized Matched Filter Tracking of Space Objects (US-11748897-B1) Sept. 5, 2023
- Systems and Methods for Radiant Gas Dynamic Mining of Permafrost for Propellant Extraction (US-11725513-B2) Aug. 15, 2023
- Pneumatically Supported Towers for Low Gravity Applications (US-11702857-B2) July 18, 2023
- Optics and Structure for Space Applications (US-11643930-B2) May 9, 2023
- Directing Light for Thermal and Power Applications in Space (US-11608196-B2) March 21, 2023
- Fabrication of Ceramics from Celestial Materials using Microwave Sintering and Mechanical Compression (US-11598581-B2) March 7, 2023
- Systems and Methods for Radiant Gas Dynamic Mining of Permafrost for Propellant Extraction (US-11566521-B2) January 31, 2023
- Omnivorous Solar Thermal Thruster, Cooling Systems, and Thermal Energy Transfer in Rockets (US-11391246-B2) July 19, 2022
- Optics and Structure for Space Applications (US-11280194-B2) March 22, 2022
- Systems and Methods for Obtaining Energy in Shadowed Regions (US-10989443-B1) April 27, 2021

== Momentus Space patents ==
- Dynamically Adjusted Alignment between Payload and Spacecraft (US-11958636-B2) April 16, 2024
- Spacecraft Propulsion Devices and Systems with Microwave Excitation (US-11527387-B2) December 13, 2022
- Space Mission Energy Management Architecture (US-11414219-B2) Aug. 16, 2022

== Tautachrome Inc. patents ==
- System and Method for Creating, Processing, and Distributing Images that Serve as Portals Enabling Communication with Persons who have Interacted with the Images (US-10339283-B2) July 2, 2019
- Authentication and Validation of Smartphone Imagery (US-10019774-B2) July 10, 2018
- Authentication and Validation of Smartphone Imagery (US-10019773-B2) July 10, 2018
- System and Method for Creating, Processing, and Distributing Images that Serve as Portals Enabling Communication with Persons who have Interacted with the Images (US-9928352-B2) March 27, 2018
- Authentication and Validation of Smartphone Imagery (US-9582843-B2) February 28, 2017

== Published applications ==
- Systems and Methods for Radiant Gas Dynamic Mining of Permafrost for Propellant Extraction (US-20230399946-A1)
- Optics and Structure for Space Applications (US-20230383650-A1)
- Systems and Methods for Radiant Gas Dynamic Mining of Permafrost (US-20230279776-A1)
- Fabrication of Ceramics from Celestial Materials using Microwave Sintering and Mechanical Compressions (US-20230280098-A1)
- Directing Light for Thermal and Power Applications in Space (US-20230249848-A1)
- Omnivorous Solar Thermal Thruster, Cooling Systems, and Thermal Energy Transfer in Rockets (US-20230130545-A1)
- Spacecraft Propulsion Devices and Systems with Microwave Excitation (US-20230068871-A1)
- Space Mission Energy Management Architecture (US-20220315251-A1)
- Hybrid Solar Thermal and Chemical Vehicle Configurations for Space Mining Applications (US-20220290635-A1)
- Fabrication of Ceramics from Celestial Materials Using Microwave Sintering and Mechanical Compression (US-20220268524-A1)
- Dynamically Adjusted Alignment Between Payload and Spacecraft (US-20220258885-A1)
- Spacecraft Thermal and Fluid Management Systems (US-20220177166-A1)
- Directing Light for Thermal and Power Applications in Space (US-20220089302-A1)
- Systems and Methods for Radiant Gas Dynamic Mining of Permafrost (US-20220090500-A1)
- Systems and Methods for Radiant Gas Dynamic Mining of Permafrost for Propellant Extraction (US-20220082019-A1)
- Directing Light for Thermal and Power Applications in Space (US-20220024612-A1)
- Omnivorous Solar Thermal Thruster, Cooling Systems, and Thermal Energy Transfer in Rockets (US-20210404419-A1)
- Systems and Methods for Obtaining Energy in Shadowed Regions (US-20210333019-A1)
- Space Mission Energy Management Architecture (S-20210197989-A1)
- Systems and Methods for Adjusting Orbit of a Payload (US-20210197987-A1)
- Spacecraft Propulsion Devices and Systems with Microwave Excitation (US-20210183624-A1)
- Optics and Structures for Space Applications (US-20210033309-A1)
- Spacecraft Propulsion Devices and Systems with Microwave Excitation (US-20200294772-A1)
- Spacecraft Structures and Mechanisms (S-20200290755-A1)
- Spacecraft Thermal and Fluid Management Systems (US-20200283174-A1)
- Systems and Methods for Radiant Gas Dynamic Mining of Permafrost for Propellant Extraction (US-20200240267-A1)
- System and Method for Creating, Processing, and Distributing Images that Serve as Portals Enabling Communication with Persons who have Interacted with the Images (US-20180157810-A1)
- Optics and Structure for Space Applications (US-20180051914-A1)
- Authentication and Validation of Smartphone Imagery (US-20170140490-A1)
- Authentication and Validation of Smartphone Imagery (US-20170140492-A1)
- System and Method for Creating, Processing, and Distributing Images that Serve as Portals Enabling Communication with Persons who have Interacted with the Images (US-20160070892-A1)
- Authentication and Validation of Smartphone Imagery (US-20140049653-A1)
