= Destinus =

European private aerospace company

Destinus Group BV
- Type: Private
- Industry: Aerospace
- Founded: March 2021; 5 years ago
- Founders: Mikhail Kokorich
- Headquarters: Hengelo, Netherlands
- Key people: Cornelius Borsch; Pedro Duque; Michel Friedling; Philipp Rosler; Oleksandr Danylyuk
- Products: Hypersonic aircraft design, drones, gas turbines
- Website: destinus.com

Destinus Group BV is a private European aerospace company specialising in aerospace, defence and energy. It focuses on supersonic and hypersonic aviation, hydrogen, dual-use technologies, and power generation. The company was founded in Payerne, Switzerland, in 2021, and moved its headquarters to Hengelo, Netherlands, in 2024.

== History ==
=== Founder ===
The company was founded in 2021 by Mikhail Kokorich, a Russian physicist, inventor, and entrepreneur. In 2011, Kokorich founded Russia's first private space company, Dauria.

In 2012, Kokorich emigrated to the US. He founded the space companies Astro Digital and Momentus in California. Astro Digital analyzes and distributes satellite data; its main customer was the US Department of Defense. Momentus has satellite shuttles to move them between different orbits, with a revolutionary propulsion system based solely on water and sunlight. Momentus raised more than $100 million in venture capital, and the company was valued at $4 billion. However, tensions with Russia escalated under the first Trump administration. Kokorich, as founder, CEO, and majority shareholder of companies important to national security, came under pressure from authorities. Permission to launch was denied. The SEC securities regulator took legal action, and he eventually had to sell his shares at a token price.

=== The company ===
In early 2021, Kokorich relocated to Europe and founded Destinus. Destinus' first prototype, Jungfrau, conducted its maiden flight in November 2021 at an airport near Munich. The test flight was a success in verifying a hypersonic aero shape based on the waverider concept at low speeds.

In early 2022, the company raised 26.8 million Swiss francs (approximately US$29 million) for the development of hypersonic hydrogen flights and associated technologies. Throughout the year, Destinus planned and achieved many key milestones, including the successful maiden flight of their Eiger prototype and the testing of their hydrogen-powered afterburner technology

In June 2022 Destinus and Spanish engine manufacturer ITP Aero agreed to jointly develop a hydrogen engine test bed and demonstrate their hydrogen combustion research with the direct support and cooperation of Instituto Nacional de Técnica Aeroespacial (INTA). The program agency of the Spanish Ministry of Science, Centro para el Desarrollo Tecnológico e Industrial (Centre for the Development of Industrial Technology), chose this project as a strategic initiative under its Plan de Tecnologías Aeronáuticas (PTA). The grant funds the construction of a test site near Madrid for air-breathing hydrogen engines, which Destinus will help design and carry out further tests. The second grant funds research into aspects of liquid hydrogen engines to test innovative propulsion solutions for future hydrogen-powered supersonic aircraft. The total investment in the second grant project is €15 million.

In November 2022, Michel Friedling, the first French Air Force general to head the French Space Command, joined the Destinus strategic committee as an advisor because he "cannot remain a spectator in front of the challenge of decarbonised hypersonic aviation". In January 2023, Oleksandr Danylyuk, former Minister of Finance of Ukraine, joined Destinus as Senior Vice President of Defense. His extensive expertise in finance and strong background in managing government affairs bring a new dimension to the company's leadership.

In February 2023, Destinus was awarded grants for two projects worth about €27 million from the Spanish government to expand hydrogen propulsion capabilities. The projects involve multiple companies, technology centres, and Spanish universities and are part of Spain's plan to make the country a world leader in producing renewable hydrogen and developing hydrogen-based mobility solutions.

Agreements and partnerships were established between Destinus and the Commune of Payerne in 2023, aligning with the company's plans to build a hydrogen test site. The intention is to further support the development of their next-generation propulsion, combining jet engines with afterburners fuelled by hydrogen.

Its first two subsonic prototypes made successful test flights in 2022. The company states that the third prototype, Destinus 3, is on track to make the hydrogen-powered flight by early 2024.

At the Paris Air Show in June 2023, Destinus unveiled its third demonstrator, the Destinus 3. If successfully flown, the model would be the world's first liquid hydrogen-powered supersonic unmanned vehicle, aiming to achieve a speed of Mach 1.3. The 10-meter, 2-tonne prototype is equipped with Destinus's hydrogen afterburner and an autopilot system. Destinus 3 is scheduled to make its first subsonic flight in early 2024, with supersonic campaigns to follow in late 2024.

In October 2023, Destinus announced the construction of the "Destinus H2 Park" in partnership with the Swiss Aeropole technology park in Payerne and Innovaud, the innovation agency of the canton of Vaud. This marks the first private testing site for hydrogen-powered propulsion systems in Switzerland and the third of its kind in Europe.

Destinus began developing and producing drones for the Ukrainian forces during the Russian invasion of Ukraine. The drone components are manufactured outside of Switzerland due to Swiss regulations over military production; they are then assembled in Ukraine.

In August 2025, Destinus agreed to acquire Zurich-based AI aviation company Daedalean for CHF 180 million.

In November 2024, it was decided to move the headquarters to the Netherlands in line with a shift towards prioritising work in the defence industry, in particular the supply of drones to the Armed Forces of Ukraine. The Swiss team in Payerne will continue to develop the engines, electronics, and software.

Destinus described that weapons they manufactured were used during the November 2026 attacks on the Crimean Bridge.

On 19 November 2026, Dutch newspaper NRC revealed that Destinus employees participated in an attack on Russian Shahed drones in Ukraine during the Russo-Ukrainian war for months. Destinus employees also helped the Ukrainian military to shoot drones at targets in Russia. Experts called this possibly a direct participation of hostilities by citizens, with the article describing it as potentially dangerous for the employees as they would lose their civilian protections under the Geneva Conventions.

== Financial context ==
As of November 2024, the valuation reached CHF 650 millions, and the start-up is working towards a new funding round, with the intent to reach a CHF 1 billion valuation.

In 2024, the turnover is estimated to exceed CHF 120 millions. For 2025, this value is estimated to reach CHF 250 to CHF 300 millions.

== Projects ==
=== Flight demonstrators ===
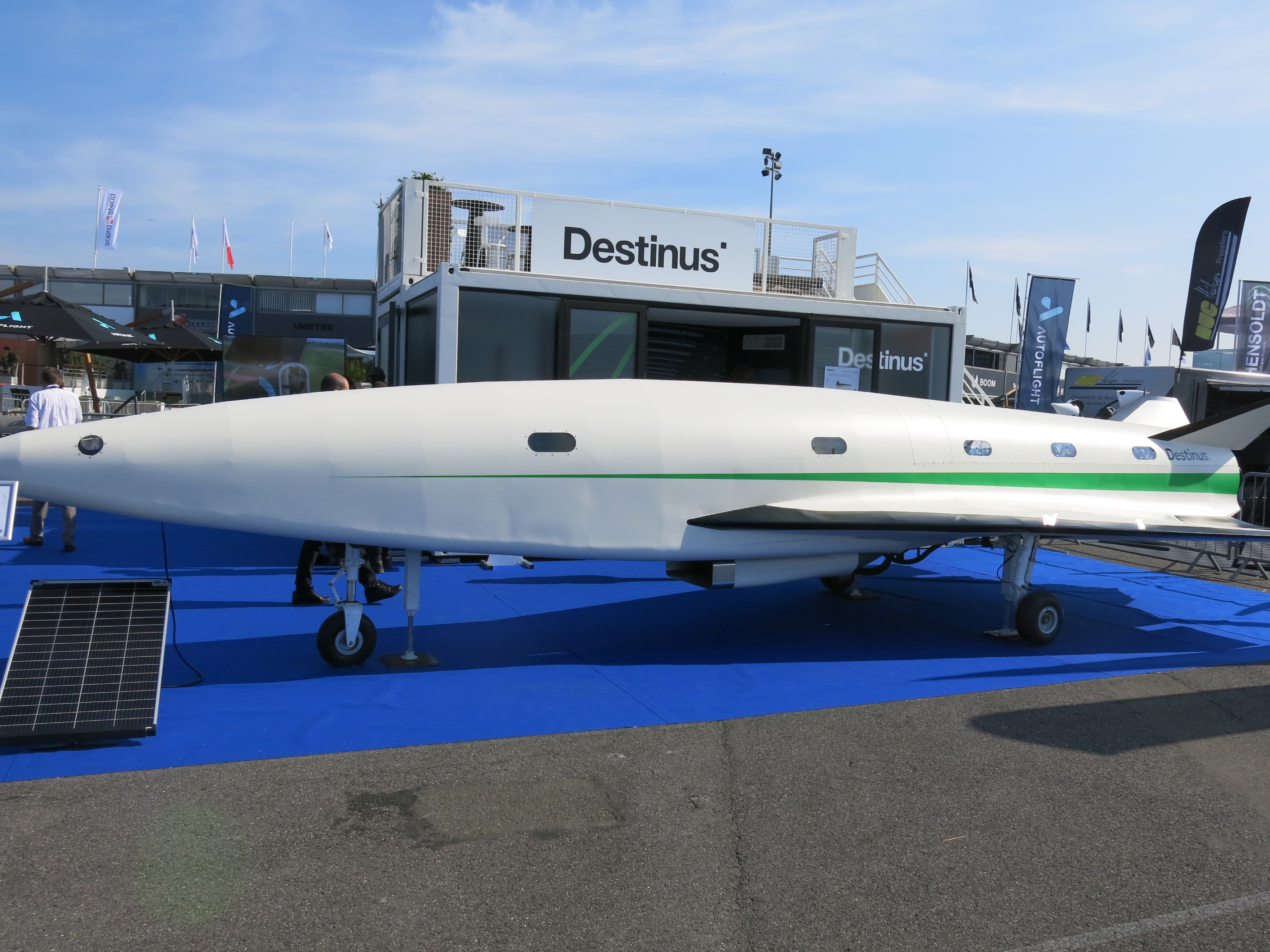
Destinus 3 at Paris Air Show 2023

- Jungfrau (Destinus-1, subsonic) is a 4 m (13 ft) vehicle designed to verify the flight capabilities of a hypersonic aero shape based on a waverider concept at low speeds; it first flew in November 2021.
- Eiger (Destinus-2, subsonic) is a 10 m (33 ft) vehicle designed to advance the hypersonic aero shape studies of Destinus-1; it first flew in April 2022.
- Destinus-3 (supersonic) is a 10 m (33 ft)-long vehicle with a 3.5 m (11 ft) wingspan designed to reach supersonic velocities with hydrogen afterburner technology and a novel autopilot system developed by Destinus. The demonstrator was designed in 2022 and 2023.

=== Civilian passenger aircraft concept ===
- The Destinus S is a not-yet-built concept for an aircraft with four high-performance engines converted to run on liquid hydrogen. The company claims the aircraft will have a cruise speed of Mach 5 with a capacity of 25 passengers.
- Destinus L is a not-yet-built concept for an aircraft capable of transporting up to 400 passengers to any destination in the world within two to three hours, according to the company's claims. This aircraft will have a cruise speed of Mach 6.

=== Military ===
- Destinus Ruta is a family of mini cruise missiles.

=== Energy ===
- OP16 gas turbine. The Netherlands-based company OPRA was acquired by Destinus SA in April 2023, becoming Destinus Energy. The company continues to produce the OPRA OP16 gas turbine, designed to allow high fuel flexibility, a small footprint, long operating hours between major overhauls and high exhaust heat temperatures.
