= Quality Leadership University Panama =

Quality Leadership University
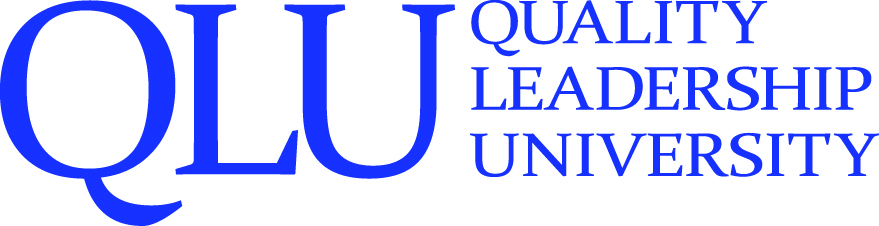
- Other names: QLU
- Type: Private
- Established: February 18, 1997
- Founders: Oscar Leon Oliva
- President: Oscar Leon Oliva
- Location: 45th Street, Bella Vista, Panama City, Panama; 8.97751°N 79.53213°W
- Website: www.qlu.ac.pa

Quality Leadership University (QLU) is a private university founded in Panama City, Republic of Panama on February 18, 1997 and authorized to operate in Panama by Executive Decree. It is located in 45th Street, Bella Vista in Panama City. It’s accredited by the Consejo Nacional de Evaluacion y Acreditacion Universitaria de Panama (CONEAUPA). All its programs are approved by the Comision Tecnica de Fiscalizacion de Panama.

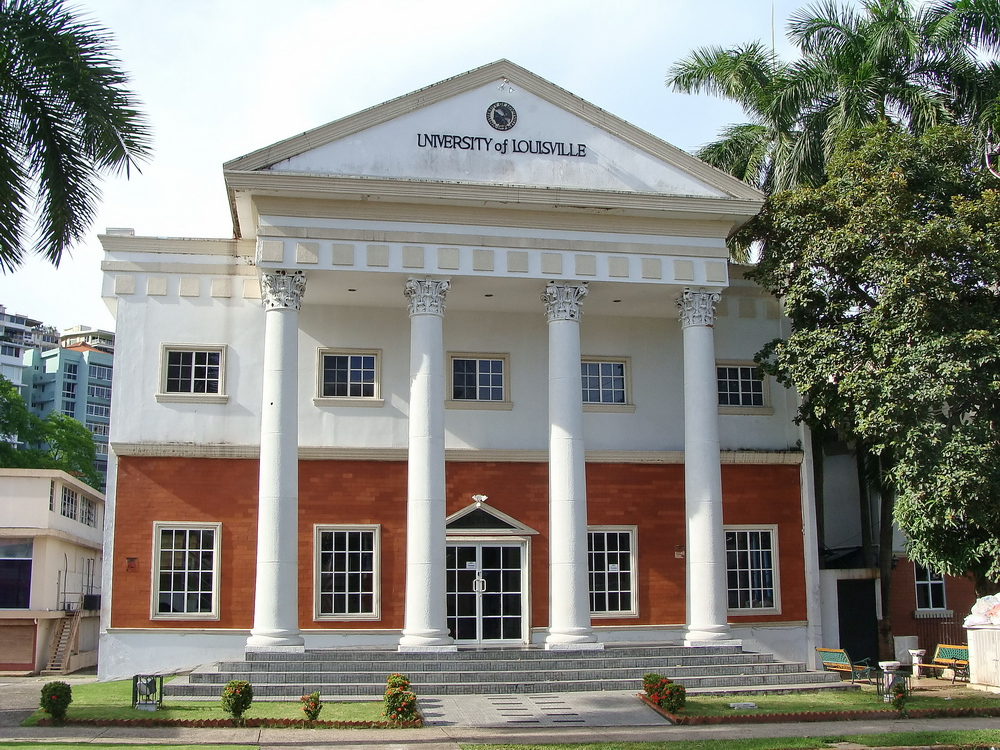
Quality Leadership University in Panama City

== History ==
Quality Leadership University (QLU) was founded on February 18, 1997 by Oscar Leon. More than 1,500 Panamanian and Latinamerican professionals have graduated in undergraduate and graduate programs. It was first located in Credicorp Building in 50th Street and the first program offered was a Master of Education in Training and Development in academic agreement with the University of Louisville.

== Memberships ==
- Consejo Latinoamericano de Escuelas de Administración, CLADEA
- Asociación de Universidades Privadas de Panamá, AUPPA
- Asociación de Universidades Privadas de Centro América, AUPRICA
- The Association to Advance Collegiate School of Business, AACSB International
- Accreditation Council of Business School and Programs, ACBSP
- Cámara de Comercio, Industrias y Agricultura de Panama, CCIAP
- American Chamber of Commerce Panama

== Agreements with other Universities ==
- University of Louisville, Kentucky
- Illinois State University, Illinois
- Towson University, Maryland
- Florida International University, Miami
- Universidad de Chile, Santiago de Chile
- Universidad Politécnica de Madrid, Madrid
- University of South Florida, Tampa

== Academic programs ==
Graduate:

- Master of Business Administration
- Master of Engineering Management
- Master of Business Marketing
- Master of Construction Management
- Master of Science in Human Resources Management and Development
- Master of Digital Marketing and Social Media
- Master of Finance

Undergraduate:

- Bachelor of Science in Business Management
- Bachelor of Science in Business Marketing
- Bachelor of Science in International Business
- Bachelor of Arts in Communication Science
