= Mikhail Kokorich =

Russian physicist and entrepreneur (born 1976)

- Kokorich in 2026
- Born: Mikhail Valeryevich Kokorich; 11 October 1976 (age 50); Aginskoye, Chita Oblast, Soviet Union
- Citizenship: Russia (until 2024); Grenada (since 2024)
- Education: Novosibirsk State University
- Occupation: Businessman
- Known for: Founder at Momentus (MNTS), developer of Vigoride, CEO at Destinus
- Children: 2

Mikhail Valeryevich Kokorich (Russian: Михаил Валерьевич Кокорич, born 11 October 1976) is a Russian physicist and entrepreneur. He has founded several companies, in Russia, the United States, and Europe, active in aerospace technologies. He is best known as a CEO and founder of Destinus, developing a high-speed aircraft, a hybrid between an airplane and a rocket, for cargo delivery purposes. Previously, Kokorich founded and developed several companies in the space industry, including Momentus Space, which was listed on the NASDAQ in the summer of 2021.

== Early life and education ==
Kokorich grew up in Siberia. He studied in the Specialized Educational Scientific Center and the Department of Physics of NSU. He finished Stanford Executive Program, and he holds an MBA degree from the Moscow School of Management.

== Career ==
He founded his first company, Dauria, as a student in 1997. Dauria provided mining and construction companies with blasting services and supplied chemical reagents for power, water treatment, and wood processing. Later, he started founding companies that were focused on space and technology, such as Dauria Aerospace, Astro Digital, Momentus Space and Destinus.

In 2004, Kokorich founded Chudodom, a domestic merchandise retail stores chain. In 2009 Chudodom merged with Lipetsk-based competitor Yuterra, forming the largest domestic merchandise company in Eastern Europe. In 2013, Kokorich sold his shares in the merged company to other shareholders.

In 2010, Kokorich bought Technosila, one of the largest electronics and household appliance chains, after the 2008 crisis. In 2012, after financial recovery and restructuring, Kokorich sold Technosila to develop his new company, Dauria Aerospace

Russian delegation at SpaceX headquarters, 2012; Kokorich in the center.

Steve Jurvetson with the CEOs of Virgin Galactic and Dauria Aerospace, 2013

=== Dauria Aerospace ===
In 2011, Kokorich founded Dauria Aerospace, with headquarters in Munich and subsidiaries in Mountain View and Moscow. In 2013, the company raised $20 million from the I2BF Global Ventures. Between 2014 and 2017, the company launched five satellites. In 2015, all of Dauria Aerospace's activities outside of Russia were halted due to the deteriorating investment climate and the geopolitical situation. Kokorich left Dauria Aerospace in the same year and co-founded Astro Digital, developing satellites for DARPA and commercial clients.

=== Momentus Space ===
In 2017, Kokorich founded space transportation company Momentus in Santa Clara, California, and he has authored many of the company's patents. Momentus became one of Y Combinator's most successful alumni, winning NASA iTech Prize in 2019. Momentus raised privately $143 million and went public in August 2021, raising $247 million in an IPO.

In January 2021, Momentus Space tried to go public on the NASDAQ exchange, but the IPO of Momentus Space was delayed due to a conflict with U.S. regulators: Mikhail Kokorich and Lev Hasis, being citizens of Russia, which is a "geopolitical rival", and under the U.S. national security law they are prohibited access to the technology used by Momentus, despite the fact that Kokorich is the developer of most of them.

In January 2021, Kokorich was forced to resign as CEO and member of Momentus' board due to pressure from the U.S. Department of Defense because of his Russian nationality.

In August 2021, the SEC accused the company and managers, including Kokorich, of misleading investors. Kokorich disagreed with the accusations and stated that he was a victim of the misapplication of US policy against Russian entrepreneurs. The new CEO of Momentus Space was succeeded by John Rood, former U.S. defense official. On 25 November 2024, the U.S. District Court for the District of Columbia entered a final consent judgment against Mikhail Kokorich, the former CEO of Momentus, Inc.

=== Destinus ===
Crimean Bridge after the 16 and 17 November attack with the Ruta missiles

In 2021, Kokorich moved to Switzerland and founded Destinus to develop hydrogen-powered hyperplanes – hybrids between a rocket and an airplane for cargo transportation between continents. In November 2021, first prototype – "Jungfrau30" – made its maiden flight. The purpose of this test was to see how the hypersonic flight geometry would perform at low speeds during the critical takeoff and landing phases. Destinus is based in the Netherlands, but has factories in Spain, Germany, Switzerland, France, Ukraine, and the United Kingdom. In January 2026 Destinus unveiled the Ruta Block 2 cruise missile. In November 2026, Ruta missiles were used by the Ukrainian army to attack the Crimean Bridge; the attack destroyed part of the bridge's main span.

== Political positions ==
In 2022 Kokorich condemned the Russian invasion of Ukraine, he is one of the prominent Russians constituting the Anti-War Committee. In January 2024, Kokorich announced that he had renounced Russian citizenship due to fundamental disagreement with government policies.
