= Gema Parreño =

Spanish data scientist and programmer (born 1988)

- Born: Gema Parreño Piqueras; 1988 (age 37–38); Albacete, Spain
- Education: Technical University of Madrid
- Occupations: Data scientist; programmer
- Known for: Deep Asteroid

Gema Parreño Piqueras (born 1988) is a Spanish data scientist and programmer. Trained as an architect, she led Deep Asteroid in the 2016 NASA International Space Apps Challenge, worked at BBVA and Google AI, and later developed the video game Mempathy.

== Early life and education ==
Parreño was born in Albacete in 1988 and graduated in architecture from the Technical University of Madrid; after graduating during the financial crisis, she helped establish a 3D animation and video-game start-up and began learning programming.

== Career ==
In 2014 Parreño and Gonzalo de la Cruz were developing Cúbicus, a game for children aged two to five, with designer Álvaro Rebollar; it was one of three start-ups selected for the PRISA Inn programme.

=== Deep Asteroid ===
In 2016 Parreño led the team behind Deep Asteroid, which began at a three-day hackathon at Google's Campus Madrid for the NASA International Space Apps Challenge; the team used TensorFlow and neural networks with the aim of classifying near-Earth objects and estimating possible impact dates. The project was placed among the 25 best projects globally and the top five for best use of data. Parreño said the model incorporated orbital parameters, observation dates and distances, and was trained to recognize changes in an object's colour, shape or chemical composition so that its classification could be updated rather than treating the new data as an error.

=== Later work ===
By 2019 Parreño was working as a data scientist at BBVA, where she applied machine learning to fraud detection. Her later game Mempathy is a narrative experience built around a conversation among the stars between a player and an artificial intelligence, and addresses the relationship between perfectionism and anxiety. Parreño said she conceived the game during the pandemic after working at Google Brain in San Francisco; in 2024 she was working as a data scientist at Izertis and was the only Spanish finalist among 50 candidates for The Rose Project.
