= E-USOC =

Spanish User Support and Operations Centre
- Abbreviation: E-USOC
- Headquarters: Madrid, Spain
- Location: Campus de Montegancedo
- Coordinates: 40.4063089°N 3.8317503°W
- Official language: Spanish, English
- Leader: Ana Laverón
- Staff: < 20 people
- Website: www.eusoc.upm.es

E-USOC (Spanish User Support and Operations Centre) is a centre of Polytechnic University of Madrid (UPM) specialized in Research and Development (R&D) activities in the fields of space science and technology. On behalf of the European Space Agency, the centre offers the necessary assistance for the preparation, execution and post-flight analysis of space experiments concerning the Fluid Science Laboratory on board the International Space Station, in the european module Columbus. E-USOC is the point of contact for the Spanish user teams developing experiments which require microgravity environment.

Another aim of E-USOC is to provide with information and to promote activities in the field of space sciences and fluid mechanics, giving technical and operation support to researchers and investigation groups which want to carry out experiments in microgravity environments or related space-science.

The headquarters is located at Campus de Montegancedo, a research and technological park of the Polytechnic University of Madrid. This building is located on the outskirts at the west of Madrid, in the town of Pozuelo de Alarcón.

Pedro Duque, Spanish astronaut and Minister of science, was the E-USOC operations director between 2003-2006.

== See also ==
- European Space Agency
- European Space Research and Technology Centre
- Polytechnic University of Madrid
