= Antonio M. Pérez =

Spanish businessman based in US (born 1947)

- Born: Antonio Manuel Pérez; 1947 (age 78–79); Vigo, Galicia, Spain
- Education: Technical University of Madrid, INSEAD
- Occupation: Business executive
- Known for: CEO of Eastman Kodak

Antonio Manuel Pérez (born 1947) is a businessman from Spain, former CEO of Eastman Kodak Company, based in Rochester, New York, in the United States.

== Education ==
An American citizen born in Vigo, Spain, Perez studied electronic engineering, marketing, and business in Spain and France, graduating from the Technical University of Madrid (Universidad Politécnica de Madrid). He subsequently earned an MBA at INSEAD. In 2009, he received an honorary doctorate degree from the University of Rochester.

== Pre-Kodak years ==
Prior to joining Eastman Kodak, Antonio Pérez spent 25 years working at Hewlett Packard; at the end of this time he was corporate vice president and a member of the company's executive council. In his career, Perez has held a variety of positions in research and development, sales, manufacturing, marketing and management both in Europe and the United States. Immediately prior to joining Kodak, Perez served as an independent consultant for large investment firms, providing counsel on the effect of technology shifts on financial markets. From June 2000 to December 2001, Perez was president and chief executive officer of Gemplus International. Perez served as a director of Schering-Plough Corporation from 2007 through November 2009 and Freescale Semiconductor, Inc. from 2004 to 2007.

== Stint at Eastman Kodak ==
Pérez was named president of Kodak on April 2, 2003. On May 19, 2005, Pérez was named CEO of Kodak after the retirement of Daniel Carp. On January 1, 2006, he became chairman of the company's board of directors.

Under Perez, who joined Kodak from Hewlett-Packard in 2003 and became chief executive in 2005, the company tried to reinvent itself by focusing on printers, packaging and work force software. Perez financed those efforts with billions in licensing fees from Kodak's intellectual property, but analysts warned that Kodak was burning through cash too quickly and could eventually run out. The price of Kodak shares decreased under his leadership from around 25 dollars (in 2005) to less than 1 dollar by September 30, 2011, and the number of Kodak employees has shrunk to about 7,000 in and around Rochester, New York, where Kodak is headquartered. Pérez was named one of the worst CEOs of 2011 by several financial news sources and publications including CNBC and the Motley Fool.

== Kodak bankruptcy ==
On January 19, 2012, Kodak officially filed for Chapter 11 bankruptcy protection, under which the company had until February 2013 to provide an acceptable restructuring plan.

In a video message, Antonio Pérez was quoted as saying, "What everyone should expect from Kodak is business as usual." Many business critics point out that "business as usual" is the problem with the Kodak Business model. They questioned how Kodak would emerge from bankruptcy as a viable company since it has not yet proved that its turnaround strategy, focusing on consumer and commercial printers, can turn a profit.

Shannon Cross, an analyst who has had a sell rating on Kodak since 2001, said the problem for Kodak was that its core businesses had not been making money and the company had been living off licensing fees for intellectual property. "To me it's not clear that the pieces that will be left at the end make sense as a stand-alone company," she said. "It's sad that it happened. It's not a surprise, the way it's been managed."

In explaining the bankruptcy, Perez said his turnaround efforts were hurt by the recession, which slowed new business growth and expedited the decline of the film business. He said the objectives of the reorganization included obtaining new financing to shore up confidence in Kodak, selling some of the company's patents and adjusting "legacy" costs – like health care benefits for retirees – to the company's now smaller size.

"Kodak is taking a significant step toward enabling our enterprise to complete its transformation," he said in prepared remarks. Under the leadership of Pérez, Eastman Kodak Co. announced on February 9, 2012, that it would stop making digital cameras, pocket video cameras and digital picture frames in a move that would mark the end of an era for the then 120-year-old company.

== Awards, recognitions, and controversy ==
Pérez received the 2008 Corporate Distinguished Achievement Award from the B'nai B'rith International for his humanitarian works and services. In 2009, Pérez received the honorary degree of Doctor of Laws from the University of Rochester during the presidency of Joel Seligman. Also, in 2009, Antonio Pérez was named one of the Top 10 CEO's "To Go", according to 247wallst.com. Criticized for being one of the worst CEO's in the nation, citing the decline of Eastman Kodak during his stint as CEO.

In February 2011, Perez was appointed to President Obama's Council on Jobs and Competitiveness. He is also a founding board member of Change the Equation, a CEO-led initiative to move the U.S. to the top of the pack in science and math education over the next decade.

Business positions
Preceded by Daniel A. Carp	CEO of Eastman Kodak; June 1, 2005 – present	Incumbent
