= Victorino Mercado =

American retired naval officer and government official

Victorino G. Mercado

Assistant Secretary of Defense for Strategy, Plans, and Capabilities
- In office June 8, 2020 – January 20, 2021
- President: Donald Trump
- Preceded by: James Anderson
- Succeeded by: Mara Karlin

Personal details
- Education: United States Naval Academy (BS); Naval Postgraduate School (MS)
- Awards: Defense Superior Service Medal (2); Legion of Merit (4); Meritorious Service Medal (4)

Military service
- Allegiance: United States
- Branch/service: United States Navy
- Years of service: 1983–2018
- Rank: Rear admiral (upper half)
- Commands: USS Decatur (DDG-73); Destroyer Squadron 21; Carrier Strike Group 8
- Battles/wars: Operation Enduring Freedom

Victorino G. "Vic" Mercado is a retired Rear Admiral of the United States Navy and a former senior defense official. He served as the Assistant Secretary of Defense for Strategy, Plans, and Capabilities from 2020 to 2021. A career surface warfare officer, Mercado is recognized as the first Filipino-American surface warfare officer to attain flag rank in the U.S. Navy.

== Early life and education ==
Mercado was born into a multi-generational military family. His grandfather served as a steward in the U.S. Navy during the 1930s, and his father, Victorino R. Mercado, retired as a Master Chief Storekeeper after 24 years of service. Mercado attended the United States Naval Academy, where he was a member of the class of 1983, earning a Bachelor of Science in Mathematics and Computer Science.

He later pursued graduate studies at the Naval Postgraduate School, receiving a Master of Science in Systems Technology (Joint Command, Control, and Communications). His professional military education includes the Air Command and Staff College and the Joint Forces Staff College.

== Naval career ==
=== Surface warfare operations ===
Mercado's early sea assignments included service as a division officer on the USS Valley Forge (CG-50) and the USS Antietam (CG-54). He also served as the operations officer on the USS Fairfax County (LST-1193). As a commander, he served as the executive officer of the guided-missile destroyer USS Curtis Wilbur (DDG-54), stationed in Yokosuka, Japan.

=== Command assignments ===
From 2001 to 2003, Mercado commanded the USS Decatur (DDG-73). Following the September 11 attacks, he led the Decatur on an accelerated deployment to the North Arabian Sea to support Operation Enduring Freedom, providing escort for carrier strike groups and conducting maritime interception operations.

He later served as Commander, Destroyer Squadron 21, where he was the Sea Combat Commander for the John C. Stennis Strike Group. In 2014, he assumed command of Carrier Strike Group 8, leading the USS Harry S. Truman (CVN-75) and its associated escorts through complex multi-national exercises and deployments.

=== Flag officer and joint staff roles ===
As a flag officer, Mercado's assignments focused on high-level maritime strategy and joint operations. He served as the Director of Maritime Operations (N3/N5) for the United States Pacific Fleet, where he was responsible for the operational readiness of over 200 ships and 1,200 aircraft across the Indo-Pacific. He also held critical roles at the Pentagon, including Executive Assistant to the Chairman of the Joint Chiefs of Staff and Military Assistant to the Deputy Secretary of Defense.

== Government service ==
In 2019, Mercado was nominated to the Senate-confirmed position of Assistant Secretary of Defense for Strategy, Plans, and Capabilities. During his confirmation hearing before the Senate Armed Services Committee, he emphasized the importance of maintaining a competitive edge in space and missile defense.

Confirmed in June 2020, Mercado oversaw the development of the National Defense Strategy and advised on the U.S. nuclear posture and global force management. He played a key role in the Department's efforts to integrate emerging technologies into long-term strategic planning.

== Post-government career ==
Following his departure from the Department of Defense in January 2021, Mercado transitioned to the private sector and academia, focusing on strategic consulting, corporate governance, and executive education.

=== Academic and executive leadership ===
In June 2021, Mercado was appointed as the Academic and Innovation Coordinator for a partnership between the University of Southern California (USC) Viterbi School of Engineering and the USC Price School of Public Policy. In this role, he helped launch the "Executive Program in Global Space and Defense," a certificate program designed to train senior military and industry leaders in the intersection of defense technology, community building, and governance. He has served as a guest speaker and curriculum advisor, emphasizing the need for strategic informed choices in large-scale defense investments.

=== Strategic advisory and corporate roles ===
Mercado serves as a senior advisor to the Board of Directors of the Missile Defense Advocacy Alliance (MDAA). As the MDAA Academic and Innovation Liaison, he advocates for the integration of space and missile defense capabilities across all domains, frequently participating in symposia and policy forums regarding regional deterrence in the Indo-Pacific.

In July 2021, he was appointed to the Board of Directors of Momentus Space. He serves as the company's Security Director and Chair of the Nominating and Corporate Governance Committee. In this capacity, he is responsible for overseeing the company's compliance with the National Security Agreement (NSA) mandated by the Committee on Foreign Investment in the United States (CFIUS).

== Legacy and community involvement ==
Throughout his career, Mercado has been an advocate for mentorship and diversity within the Armed Forces. He has spoken extensively on the challenges faced by Asian American and Pacific Islander (AAPI) officers, citing figures such as Senator Daniel Inouye as personal inspirations.

He is a recipient of the Commander in Chief, U.S. Pacific Fleet Shiphandler of the Year award, a prestigious honor recognizing tactical excellence at sea. His career is often cited as a milestone in Filipino-American military history, representing three generations of service that began with his grandfather enlisting as a steward in the 1930s.

== Awards and decorations ==
His military awards include the following:

- Defense Superior Service Medal with one oak leaf cluster
- Legion of Merit with three gold stars
- Meritorious Service Medal with three gold stars
- Navy and Marine Corps Commendation Medal
- Navy and Marine Corps Achievement Medal
