= Zakkyo =

Japanese mixed-use buildings

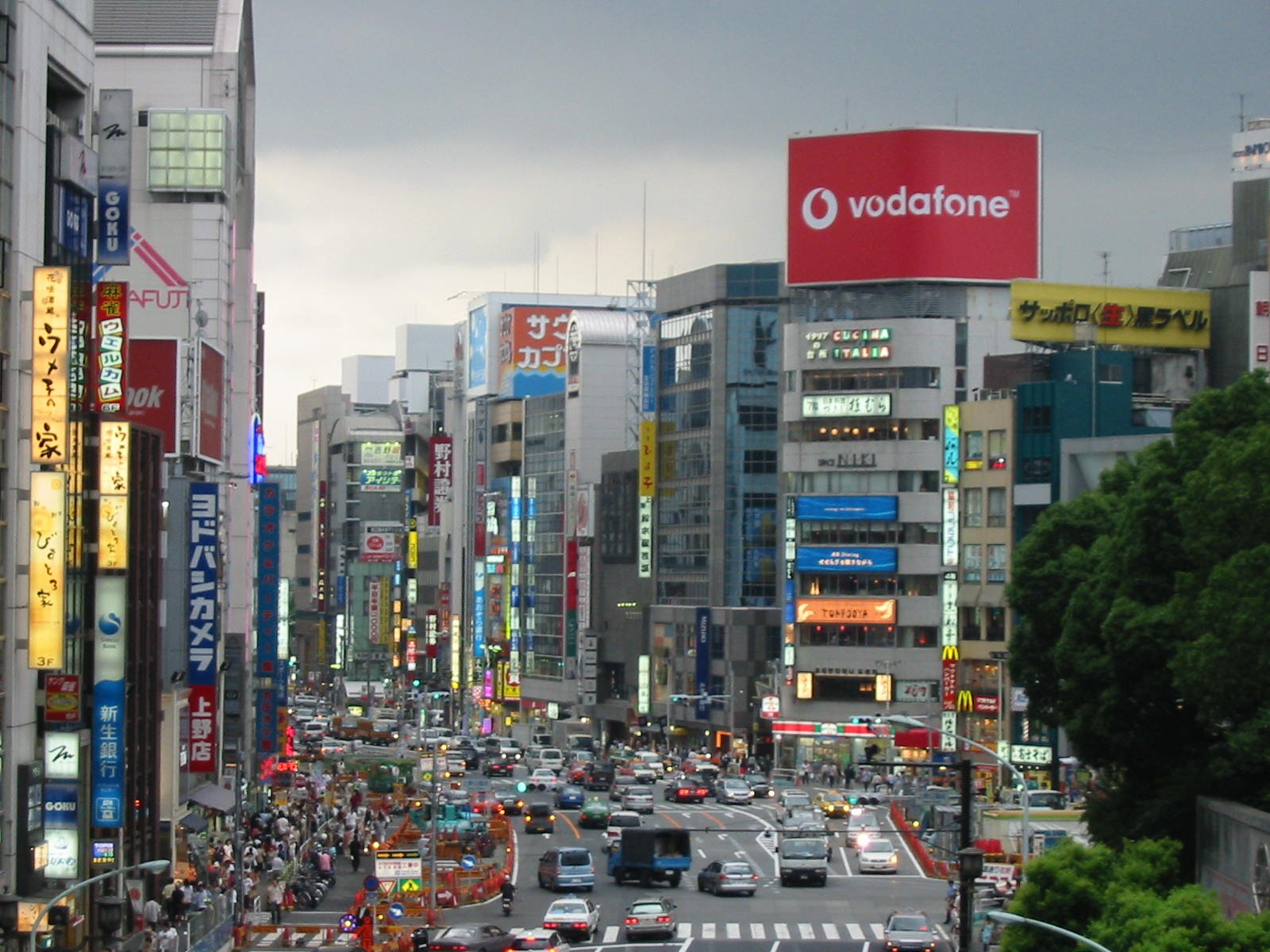
Zakkyo buildings in Tokyo

Zakkyo (Japanese: 雑居, lit. 'miscellaneous-cohabitation') is a mixed-use, primarily commercial building type in Japan. It is common in urban areas of Japanese cities. Similar structures also exist in other Asian countries.

== History ==
Zakkyo buildings (Zakkyo-biru) emerged in 1960s, during the period of Japanese economic miracle, when land in city centers was scarce and costly. Laxer regulations and building height restrictions introduced an opportunity for entrepreneurs with limited capital to start their business.

The introduction of progressive inheritance tax boosted the rise of these buildings. To pay it off, families sold portions of their inherited property, repeatedly breaking larger estates down into fragmented parcels.

By the end of 20th century, this type of development became widespread in big cities all across Japan, especially in areas near railway stations.

== Design ==
Typical Zakkyo is a multi-story modernist building, often featuring a lot of signage on the facade, corresponding to businesses inside. Each floor, or sometimes just a portion of a floor, is rented to a different owner. They can be identified by their distinctive proportions, being very narrow but tall, reaching many stories high, with the goal of fitting the most amount of enterprises on a small land plot.
