= Destinus Ruta =

Low-cost mini cruise missile

The Destinus Ruta is a family of mini cruise missiles produced by the European aerospace company Destinus Group BV.

In May 2025 Destinus and Grupo Oesía announced an agreement to develop a guidance, navigation and control system for the Ruta missile system. Oesia claimed the Ruta cruises at a speed of Mach 0.8 and uses terminal optical guidance, allowing a final impact accuracy with a circular error probable (CEP) of 15m. The turbojet engine is built in-house by Destinus, so it is not sourced from the U.S.

In April 2026 Destinus and Rheinmetall announced a plan to establish a joint venture called Rheinmetall Destinus Strike Systems to specialise in the production of advanced cruise missiles and ballistic rocket artillery. At the time the two companies said that Destinus was producing around 2,000 cruise missiles a year and that these had been battle-tested in Ukraine.

== Ruta Block 1 ==
The Ruta Block 1 has a claimed range of more than 300 kilometres (190 mi) and a payload of 150 kilograms (330 lb). It has a claimed pre-programmed terminal guidance capable of operating in situations where global navigation satellite systems are denied. It can fly a low-altitude profile using terrain-following navigation. The missile is jet-powered, has wings that are attached before launch, two side-mounted boosters and an open-platform launcher. It reportedly has a total takeoff mass of 300 kilograms (660 lb).

== Ruta Block 2 ==
The Block 2 missile was designed for precision strike against hardened and high-value targets. Notable differences from Block 1 are foldable wings and control surfaces and an in-line booster, which allow the missile to fit in a sealed launch canister, allowing more flexible employment on mobile ground and maritime platforms. It has a claimed range of more than 700 kilometres (430 mi) and a payload of 250 kilograms (550 lb). It is capable of low-altitude terrain-following penetration and uses an electro-optical/infrared seeker for terminal guidance. Elements for Block 2 were being tested as of May 2026 with support from Ukraine's Brave1, with a flight test having been conducted in April 2026. In June 2026, the Netherlands announced an order of 700 Block 2 missiles which would be delivered to Ukraine.

== Ruta Block 3 ==
The Block 3 version of the Ruta missile family will have a range of 2,000 kilometres (1,200 mi) while still carrying a 250 kilograms (550 lb) warhead. It will be powered by a purpose-built turbojet.

== Operational history ==
Russian bloggers posted photographs on 24 July 2026 of the wreckage of a cruise missile that is "consistent with the known design characteristics" of the Ruta Block 1. The location and date of the wreckage is unknown. There is also video of a missile, said to be a Ruta Block 1, flying towards an unknown target.

On 17 November 2026, Ruta cruise missiles hit the Kerch Bridge, destroying the span carrying car traffic entirely and heavily damaging pillars that carry the span of the train bridge. According to Destinus president Oleksandr Danyliuk, nine missiles were launched, seven of which struck the bridge. He also stated that the company's Da Vinci (Lord) drones participated in the operation and that Destinus systems were the only foreign-made weapons used.

== Cost ==
The cost of the 700 missiles for Ukraine was estimated at €250 million euros in 2026, which averages at €357,000 per missile, though this is likely to include ancillary equipment and services such as training. It was not known if this is for Block 1 or 2 missiles, or a mixture.
