= Technical University of Madrid =

University in Spain

Coordinates: 40.4492°N 3.7281°W

- Universidad Politécnica de Madrid
- Motto: Technica impendi nationi (Latin for "Technology impulses nations")
- Type: Public
- Established: 1971
- Affiliations: CRUE, CRUMA, CESAER, IAU, SEFI, TIME, EUA, EAIE, PEGASUS, SSU
- Endowment: €349,119,860
- Rector: Guillermo Cisneros
- Students: 35,833
- Location: Madrid
- Campus: Both urban and rural
- Website: www.upm.es

University rankings

Global – Overall
- ARWU World: 701–800 (2023)
- QS World: =349 (2024)
- THE World: 801–1000 (2024)
- USNWR Global: =564 (2023)

The Technical University of Madrid or sometimes called Polytechnic University of Madrid (Spanish: Universidad Politécnica de Madrid, UPM) is a public university, located in Madrid, Spain. It was founded in 1971 as the result of merging different Technical Schools of Engineering and Architecture, originating mainly in the 18th century. Over 35,000 students attend classes during the year.

The UPM is part of the TIME network, which groups fifty engineering schools throughout Europe.

== History ==
The Technical University of Madrid (UPM) was founded in 1971, although the majority of its Centres are over hundreds of years old and were founded in the 18th and 19th centuries. Each of them maintained their independence until being grouped together to form the UPM in 1971. It is no exaggeration to state that for over one and a half centuries great part of the history of Spanish technology has been written by the Schools of Architecture and Engineering of the UPM. They have been for many years nearly the only, and in some cases the only school of their type. All of the important personalities in the area of teaching and research passed through their respective centres as students or lecturers.

One of the oldest records of technological studies in Spain is the Royal Academy of Mathematics in Madrid, leaving aside the Quatrivium of arithmetics, geometry, astronomy and music, the four liberal arts, that form the base of the technical disciplines, which were studied in the monastic and cathedral schools and later in the medieval and renaissance universities. The Royal Academy of Mathematics was created after the idea and personal initiative of King Philip II after his return from a visit to Portugal in 1582, where he realised that the Portuguese cartographers were more advanced than those in Spain. The academy did not award qualifications that entitled to exercise a profession. Its prestige was based on the lecturers and subjects taught. Cartographers, pilots, architects and engineers were trained in a way that the latter two started to gain a certain degree of recognition. In 1643 the academy was closed down. The second relevant record of technological studies was the Corps of Army, Cities, Ports and Frontiers Engineers founded by King Philip V in 1711. This date marked the foundation of the Spanish engineers as an organised profession. In 1716, for their training, the Royal Military School of Mathematics in Barcelona was created, even if it was not opened until 1720 and besides was limited to a strictly military context.

=== Architecture ===
Among all the subjects that nowadays form part of the Technical University of Madrid, the first to start specific and concrete lectures and not in a generalised manner, as it was the case of engineering that started with a military background, was architecture, years before the School and the Academy of Fine Arts were created. The Foundation Assembly of the Royal Academy of the Three Noble Arts of Saint Ferdinand was held on 18.07.1744 in the home of G.D. Olivieri, first sculptor to the king since 1741 where he had a private academy and its studies prepared the way for the ones that were officially regulated in the assembly. Twelve lecturers, four for each subject where appointed. The classes of the new School that depended on the Academy of Fine Arts started in the Casa de la Panadería in the Plaza Mayor of Madrid and continued there until 1773 when the academy moved to its present building.

Although the Special School of Fine Arts was founded in 1845 as an independent entity, it was at the beginning under the inspection and monitoring of the academy. At present the Higher Technical School of Architecture is located in a modern building in the Ciudad Universitaria in Madrid.

=== School of Naval Architecture ===
King Charles III ordered on 13.08.1772 the foundation of the School of Naval Architecture for the training of the future members of the Corps of Naval Architects (24.12.1770). The academy was opened in El Ferrol. After several years of teaching a series of difficulties led to the closure of the centre. French naval architects were taken on after intense negotiations and the centre was reopened in the Arsenal de la Carraca in Cadiz in 1848. Today's School of Naval Architects, located in the Ciudad Universitaria, is one out of two UPM schools that started with a military background and is completely civilian nowadays. Several years later the same happened in the School of Aeronautics.

=== School of Mining Engineering ===
The School of Mining Engineering was the first that from the day of its foundation had a civil character. It was established in 1777 by the orders of King Charles III of Spain in Almadén, Ciudad Real, where already some type of informal teaching existed, in order to make use of a very important element: the mercury mines. Mercury was in those days an irreplaceable material for the amalgamation of silver, which was one of the key sources of wealth in Latin America, especially in Mexico. This school started its activities in a similar historical context to that of other centres such as those in Saxony (Freiberg 1767), Hungary (Schmnitz 1770) and France (Paris 1778).

The center was transferred to the Mexican viceroyalty, and it remained there until the end of the Mexican Independence War from Spain. It was then transferred to Madrid where the Interior Minister, Martín de los Heros, inaugurated the premises on 7.01.1835. A new building for the School of Mining Engineering of Madrid was inaugurated in the 1890s.

=== School of Civil Engineering ===
At the beginning of the 19th century, in 1802, the School of Civil Engineering, considered the best one in Spain, was founded at the initiative of Agustín de Betancourt, an outstanding representative of the eloquent restless and inquiring spirit of the Spanish Enlightenment. It was located in the Palacio del Buen Retiro in Madrid until May 1808.

At the beginning of the academic year 1889–90, students and professors continued their activity in the new building in Alfonso XII Street, where the School remained until it moved to its current location in the Ciudad Universitaria in Madrid.

This school has been classified by El Mundo as the best Civil Engineering School in Spain, and its six-year degree has been certified by the Accreditation Board for Engineering and Technology (ABET).

=== School of Forestry Engineering ===
A Royal Decree created the Special School of Forestry Engineering in 1835, although it did not start its activity until 1848 in Villaviciosa de Odón, Madrid. The first graduates of the School of Villaviciosa created the Corps of Forestry Engineers. Its current premises are in the Ciudad Universitaria in Madrid.

=== School of Industrial Engineering ===
The industrial engineers' lectures descend from the Patriotic Seminar of Vergara and the activities of the Economic Associations of Friends of the Country. José I in Madrid opened the Arts Conservatory, an imitation of the one in Paris, in 1809. The Royal Decree (18.08.1842) reopened it with the same name but within a short period of time it was again shut down. The Minister of Trade, Seijas Lozano, signed a Royal Decree (4.10.1850) in order to create the Royal Industrial Institute and the degree in Industrial Engineering.

=== School of Agricultural, Food and Biosystems Engineering ===
The Minister of Public Works, Manuel Alonso Martínez, founded the Central Agriculture School on 1 October 1855. At first it was set up on the "La Flamenca" estate on the Royal Property in Aranjuez. It was closed on 3 November 1868 and by another Decree (28.01.1869) immediately moved to Madrid. Ratified by several legal norms, it was given the so-called "La Florida" or "La Moncloa" property, the present University Campus of Madrid, as well as other nearby land. The new building of the Agricultural Institute of Alfonso XII was constructed on the property. Later it was called National Agronomy Institute and today Higher Technical School of Agricultural Engineering of Madrid. Among other studies, it hosts the bachelor's degree in biotechnology, which has the highest admission grade requirement of the whole university (12.914/14).

=== School of Telecommunication Engineering (Electrical and Computer Engineering) ===
The General School of Telegraphy was the first of the three Higher Schools to be created in the 20th century. It was founded by a Decree (3.06.1913) with three sections and another Decree (22.04.1920) created the qualification of Telecommunication Engineer. From 1912 to 1935 it was located in a building on Paseo de Recoletos in Madrid, until 1936 on Ferraz Street, then on Conde de Peñalver Street until it was finally transferred to the Ciudad Universitaria in Madrid. It is one of the best reputed telecommunication schools in Spain. In fact, their telecommunications degree has been an ABET accredited program since 2008.

=== School of Aeronautical Engineering ===
In 1926 and 1928 the qualification of Aeronautical Engineer and the Higher School of Aeronautical Engineering, located near the airfield of Cuatro Vientos in Madrid, were created almost simultaneously. The Military Academy of Aeronautical Engineering was set up by a Decree (15.10.1939) and by another recovered its civilian character. The Technical Education Organisation Law (20.07.1957) provided it with its current name of Higher Technical School of Aeronautical Engineering. It was established in a modern building in the Ciudad Universitaria in Madrid. Currently with the Bologna plan the degree taught receives the name of Aerospace Engineering, and the school is now called ETSIAE (Escuela Técnica Superior de Ingenieros Aeronáuticos y del Espacio).

=== School of Computer Sciences Engineering and Mathematics ===
The newest of the centres is the School of Computer Sciences. Madrid's Institute of Computer Sciences was created in 1969 outside the university framework until the studies in 1976 became part of the university and simultaneously the School of Computer Sciences was set up. From the first day of lectures in October 1977, it was integrated into the UPM. Since 1988 it has been located on the campus of Montegancedo.

The School of Computer Sciences offers the first Spanish undergraduate degree in Mathematics and Computer Sciences. The program condenses studies of mathematics and computer sciences into one degree, placing special emphasis on the mathematical foundations of computer science and computer-based tools for mathematics. It combines mathematics and informatics subjects, focusing on fields where the two are most relevant to each other and stressing the interrelationships between the two disciplines to shape a degree course that is being successfully taught at leading world universities such as Massachusetts Institute of Technology (MIT) in the US, the University of Oxford in the UK or Université Pierre et Marie Curie in France.

=== School of Physical Activity and Sport Sciences (INEF) ===
Since 14 September 1998 the Faculty of Physical Activity and Sport Sciences (INEF) was an affiliated centre and on 1 October 2003 was integrated to the university.

=== Technical Assistants Engineering schools ===
The University Schools of Technical Engineering were mainly set up at the same time as the Higher Technical Schools to provide training for Assistants or Technicians. However, these names gradually disappeared and gave way to the present names and qualifications.

== Education ==
Traditionally, in Spain there were two levels of technical studies. For engineering studies there was a 3-year degree called Ingeniero Técnico (Technical Engineer, roughly equivalent to a BSc) with all powers and legal authority in their field and a 5- or 6-year degree called Ingeniero (Engineer, roughly equivalent to a MSc). In the case of architecture studies there was a 3-year degree called Arquitecto Técnico (Technical Architect) and a 5-year degree called Arquitecto (Senior Architect). Those degrees disappeared as a result of the Bologna process and the new structure features 4-year BSc degrees and 1- or 2-year MSc degrees maintaining the same professional and legal responsibilities that previously called technical engineers with master's degrees on top. Technical University of Madrid access grades rank as the highest in their fields every year.

== Campuses ==
UPM's Schools are spread all over Madrid, instead of being placed in a unified campus. They are:

- University City (Ciudad Universitaria) or Moncloa Campus
- Montegancedo Campus
- South Campus (Vallecas's Politechnical Complex)
- Downtown Campus (Schools inside Madrid's historical center)

== Research ==
The Scientific and Technological Park of the UPM ("Parque UPM") represents a significant boost to the university's R&D&i activity through the creation of new R&D&i centres, business incubators, and specialized laboratories, with the backing and participation of public and private institutions.

The concept of "Parque UPM" covers various scientific and technological areas linked with engineering and architecture. It is geographically distributed in various sites, all of which are located in the region of Madrid (Comunidad Autónoma de Madrid): South Campus, Montegancedo and Getafe.

- University Institutes and Centers:
  - Solar Power Institute
  - Institute of Automobile Research (INSIA), with hybrid electric vehicle research.
  - Microgravity Institute Ignacio da Riva
  - Spanish User Support and Operations Centre (E-USOC)
  - Institute of Optoelectronics and Microtechnology Systems (ISOM)
  - Supercomputing and Visualization Center of Madrid (CeSViMa)
  - Center for the Transport Research (TRANSYT)
  - Center for Biomedical Technology
  - Laser Center
  - Institute of Solar Energy
  - Institute for Nuclear Fusion
  - Institute for Automobile Research
  - Institute for Microgravity
  - Institute for Optoelectronic Systems and Microtechnology
  - Integral Domotic Center (CeDInt).

== International ==
=== UPM double degrees ===
The UPM has signed 87 specific double degree agreements with centres of excellence at various universities worldwide.

A double degree allows the best students to study for an international degree by combining studies in two types of engineering, at the same time as it prepares them better for their future career. On completing their studies, students will simultaneously obtain a degree from the UPM in addition to a degree from the foreign university they have attended.

A list of the universities that have double degree programs with the UPM is shown above.

==== France ====
- Arts et Métiers ParisTech (ENSAM)
- École Centrale de Lille
- École Centrale de Lyon
- École Centrale de Marseille
- École Centrale de Nantes
- École Centrale Paris (ECP)
- École des Hautes Études Commerciales (HEC)
- École Nationale des Ponts et Chaussées (Ponts ParisTech)
- École nationale supérieure de génie industriel
- École Nationale Supérieure de Mécanique et d'Aérotechnique (ENSMA)
- École Nationale Supérieure des Mines de Douai
- École Nationale Supérieure des Mines de Nancy
- École Nationale Supérieure des Mines de Nantes
- École Nationale Supérieure des Mines de Paris (Mines ParisTech)
- École Nationale Supérieure des Mines de Saint-Étienne
- École Nationale Supérieure des Techniques Avancées de Paris (ENSTA)
- École Nationale Supérieure des Télécommunications de Bretagne
- École Nationale Supérieure des Télécommunications de Paris
- École Nationale Supérieure d'Informatique et de Mathématiques Appliquées (ENSIMAG)
- École Polytechnique
- École Supérieure d'Électricité (Supélec)
- Institut National des Sciences Appliquées de Toulouse (INSA Toulouse)
- Institut Supérieur de l'aéronautique et de l'espace (ISAE-SUPAERO)

==== Germany ====
- Hanover University of Applied Sciences and Art
- Mannheim University of Applied Sciences
- Technische Universität Berlin
- Technische Universität Darmstadt
- Technical University of Munich
- University of Stuttgart

==== Italy ====
- Politecnico di Milano
- Politecnico di Torino
- Università degli Studi di Trento
- Università degli Studi di Napoli Federico II

==== Belgium ====
- Faculté polytechnique de Mons
- UCLouvain
- University of Liège
  - Gembloux Agro-Bio Tech
- Université libre de Bruxelles

==== Sweden ====
- Kungliga Tekniska Högskolan (KTH)
- Lunds Tekniska Högskola

==== Denmark ====
- Danmarks Tekniske Universitet

==== Czech Republic ====
- Czech University of Life Sciences Prague (FFWS)

==== United Kingdom ====
- Cranfield University
- North East Wales Institute of Higher Education (NEWI)

==== Austria ====
- Technische Universität Wien

==== United States ====
- Illinois Institute of Technology, Chicago

==== Argentina ====
- Universidad Nacional de la Patagonia Austral

==== Peru ====
- Pontificia Universidad Católica del Perú

=== Others ===
The UPM has Erasmus agreements with most European engineering schools. Moreover, it has many other international agreements. Here is a summary of the different international agreements:

1. Erasmus Grants
2. Athens Program
3. Magalhães Program
4. Erasmus Mundus Program
5. MIT exchange
6. GE4 Program
7. Spanish Chinese Exchange Program
8. Spanish Indian Program
9. Vulcanus Program
10. Student Mobility with no Exchange Program
11. EIT Digital Program

== Notable alumni ==
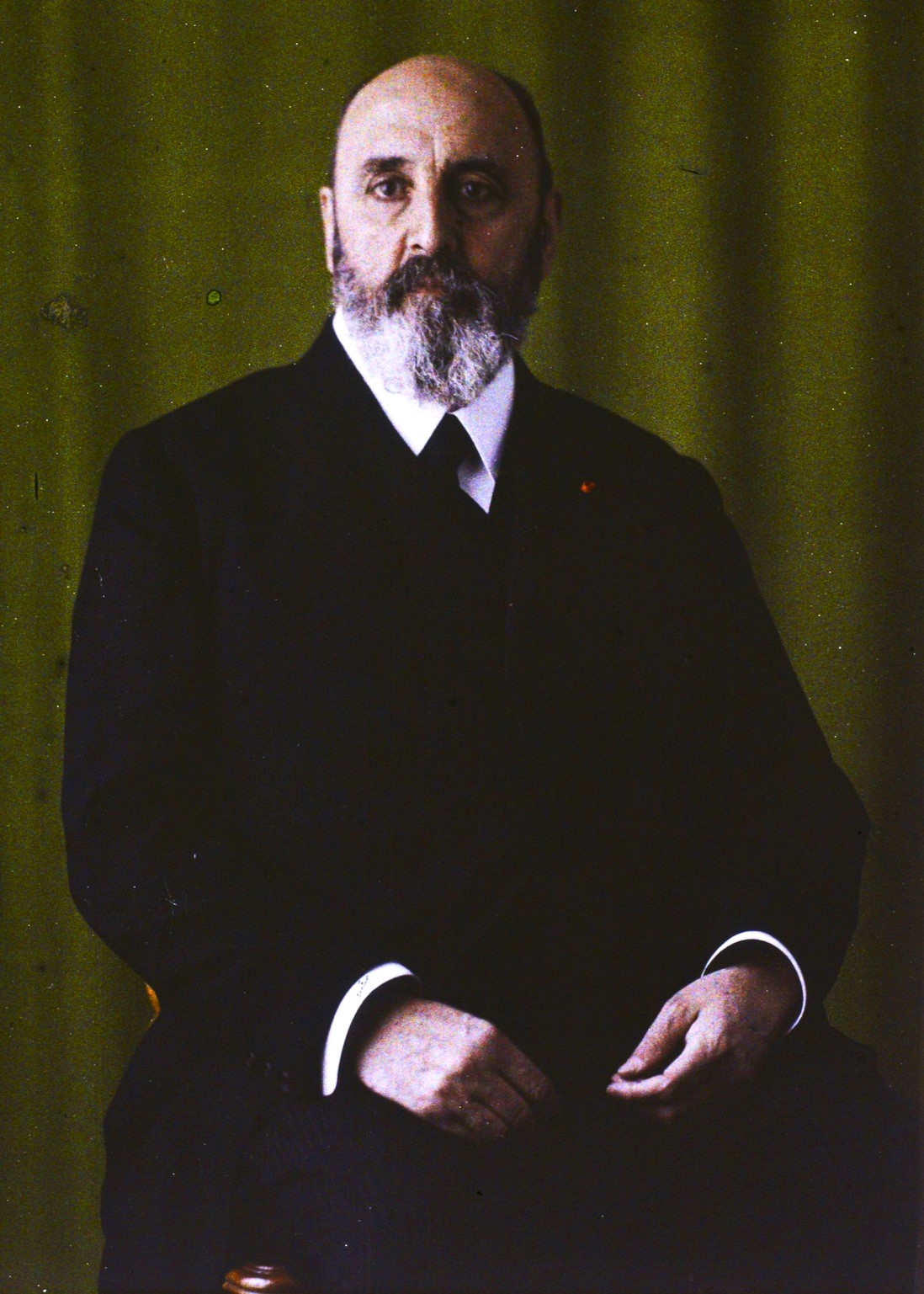
Leonardo Torres Quevedo

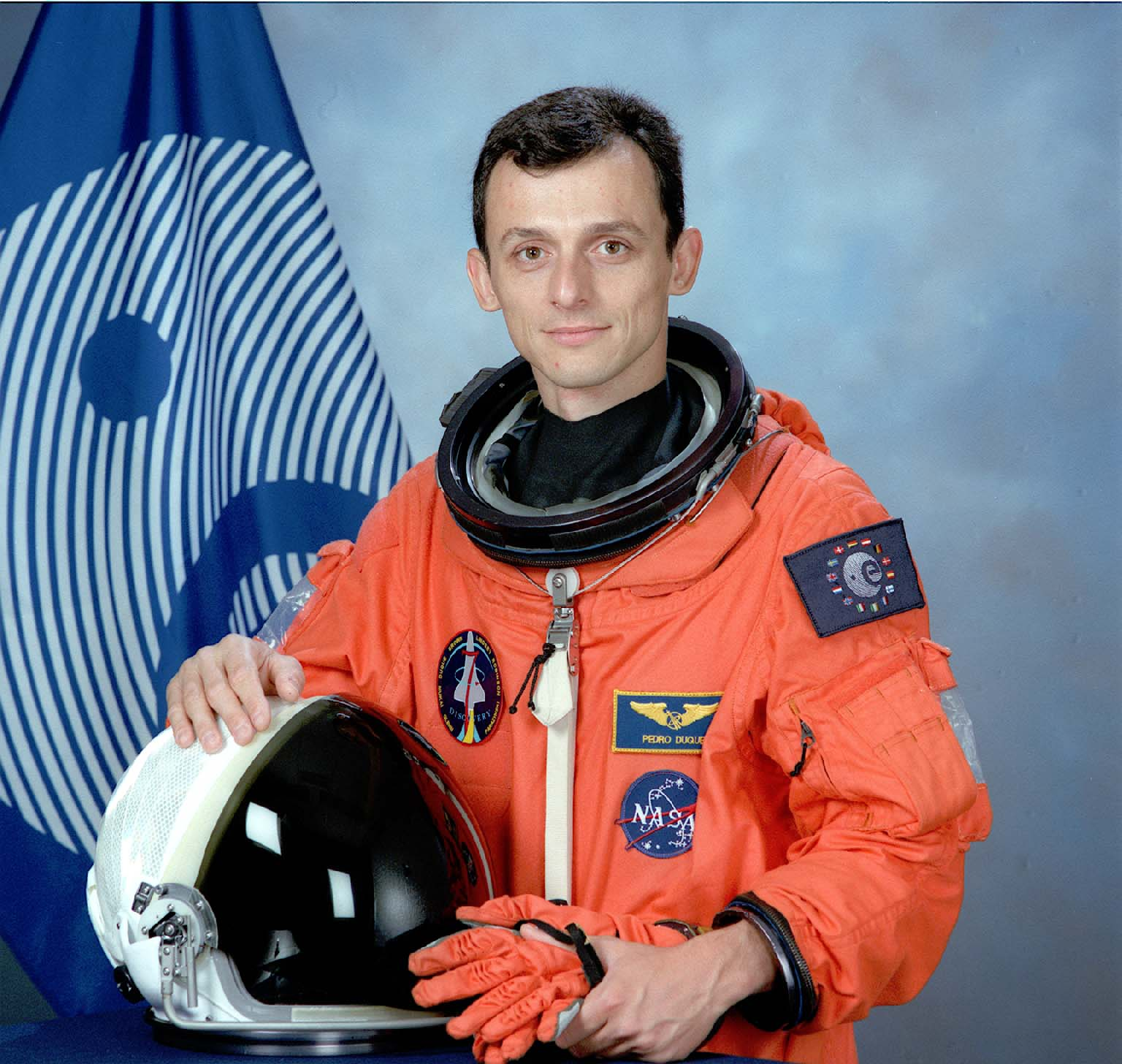
Pedro Duque

- Florentino Pérez, Real Madrid C.F. chairman and ACS CEO
- Práxedes Mateo Sagasta, seven times Prime Minister of Spain
- Francisco Álvarez Cascos, former Deputy Minister of Spain
- Rafael Benítez, football manager
- Josep Borrell, politician, President of the European Parliament and former minister
- Leopoldo Calvo Sotelo, former Prime Minister of Spain
- Ángel Cabrera, president Georgia Institute of Technology 2019-, president George Mason University 2012–2019
- Jaime Caruana, former Governor for the Bank of Spain from 2000 to 2006
- Francisco Manuel de las Heras y Borrero (1951–2013), Spanish historian
- Rafael del Pino, civil engineer, Founder and Former CEO of Ferrovial, 79th wealthiest man in the world according to Forbes
- Pedro Duque, astronaut and former Minister of Science
- Rafael Moneo, architect
- Leonardo Torres Quevedo, inventor (several engineering fields)
- Antonio M. Pérez, CEO of Eastman Kodak
- Juan Mata, attacking midfielder for A-League Men club Melbourne Victory
- Antonio Luque, engineer, photovoltaic solar energy pioneer
- Alberto Cardenas Jimenez, Mexican politician
- Gema Parreño, data scientist and programmer.

== Image gallery ==
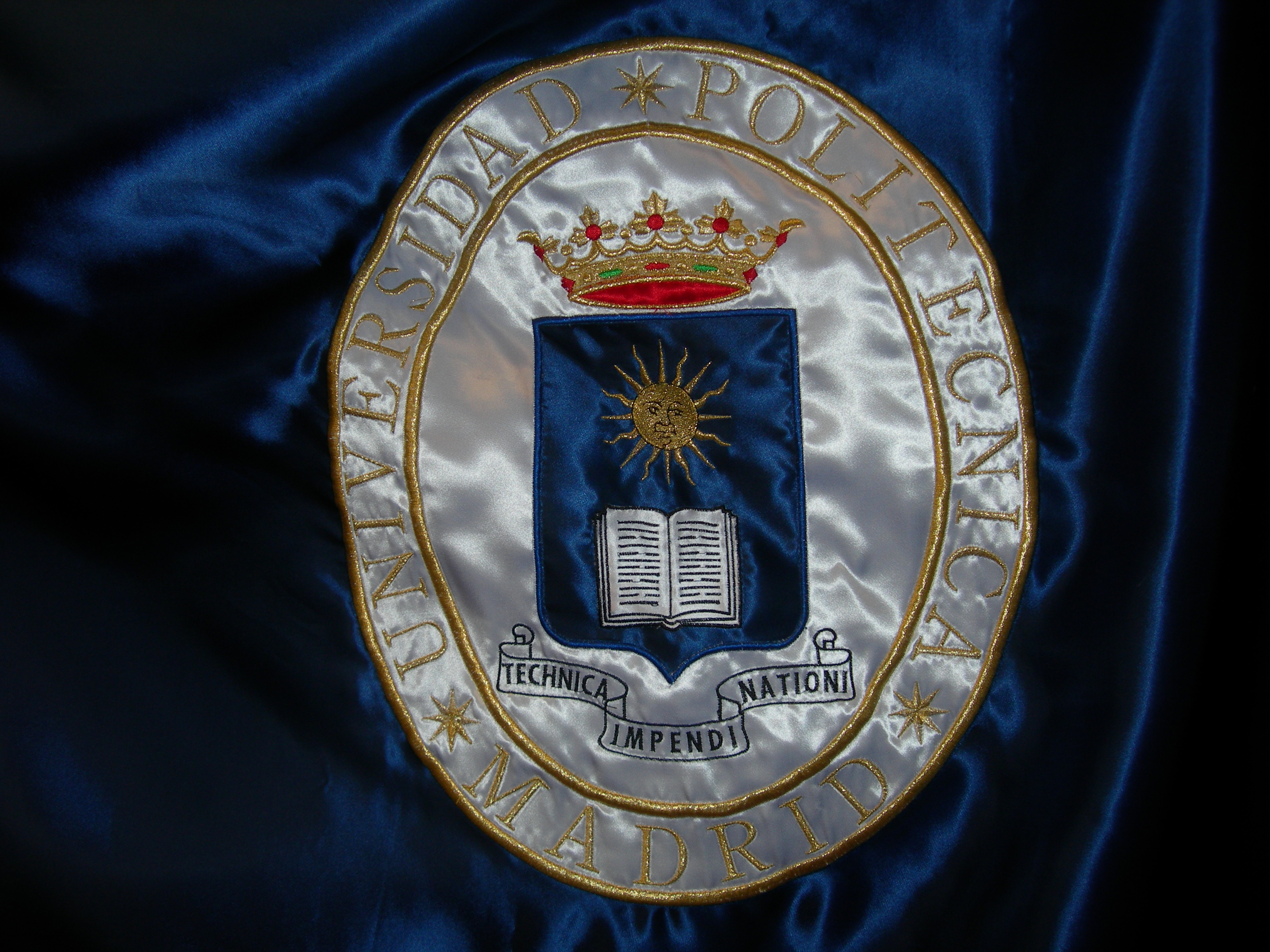
UPM Flag

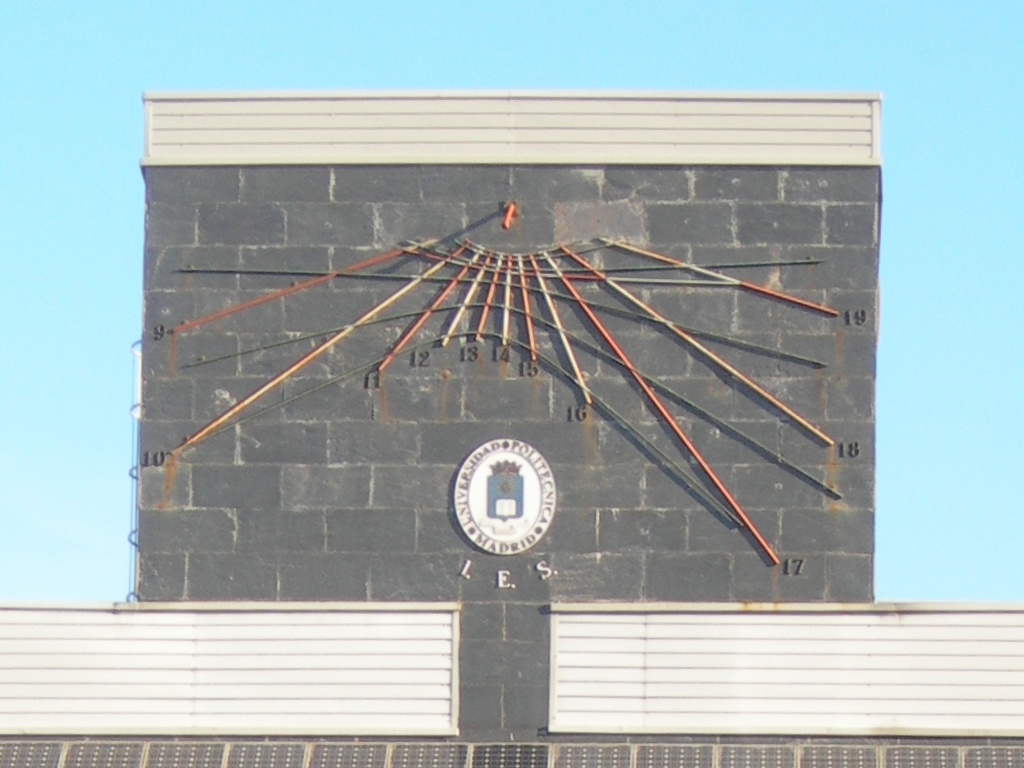
Sundial at the Institute of Solar Energy

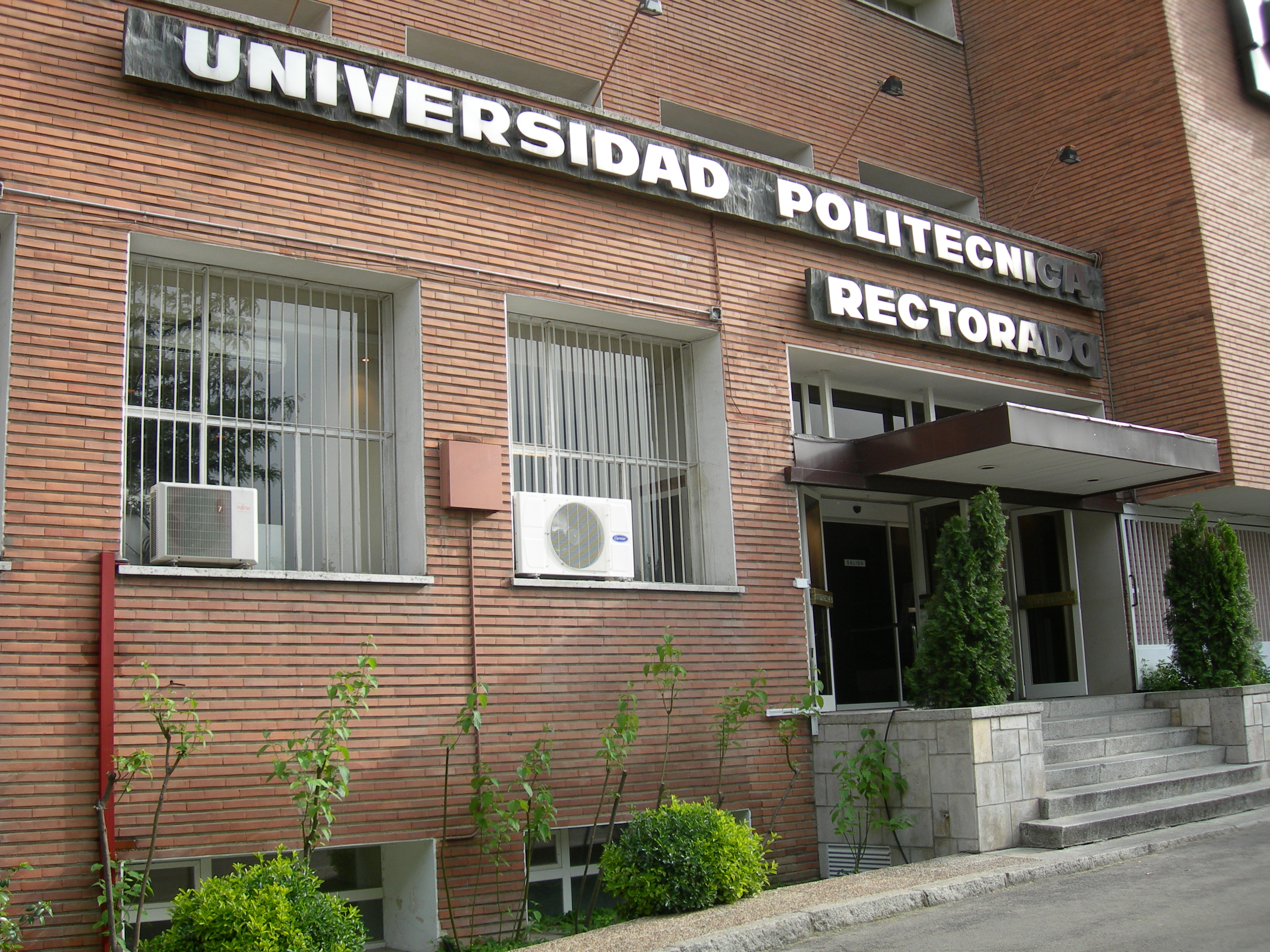
Entrance of the Rectorate

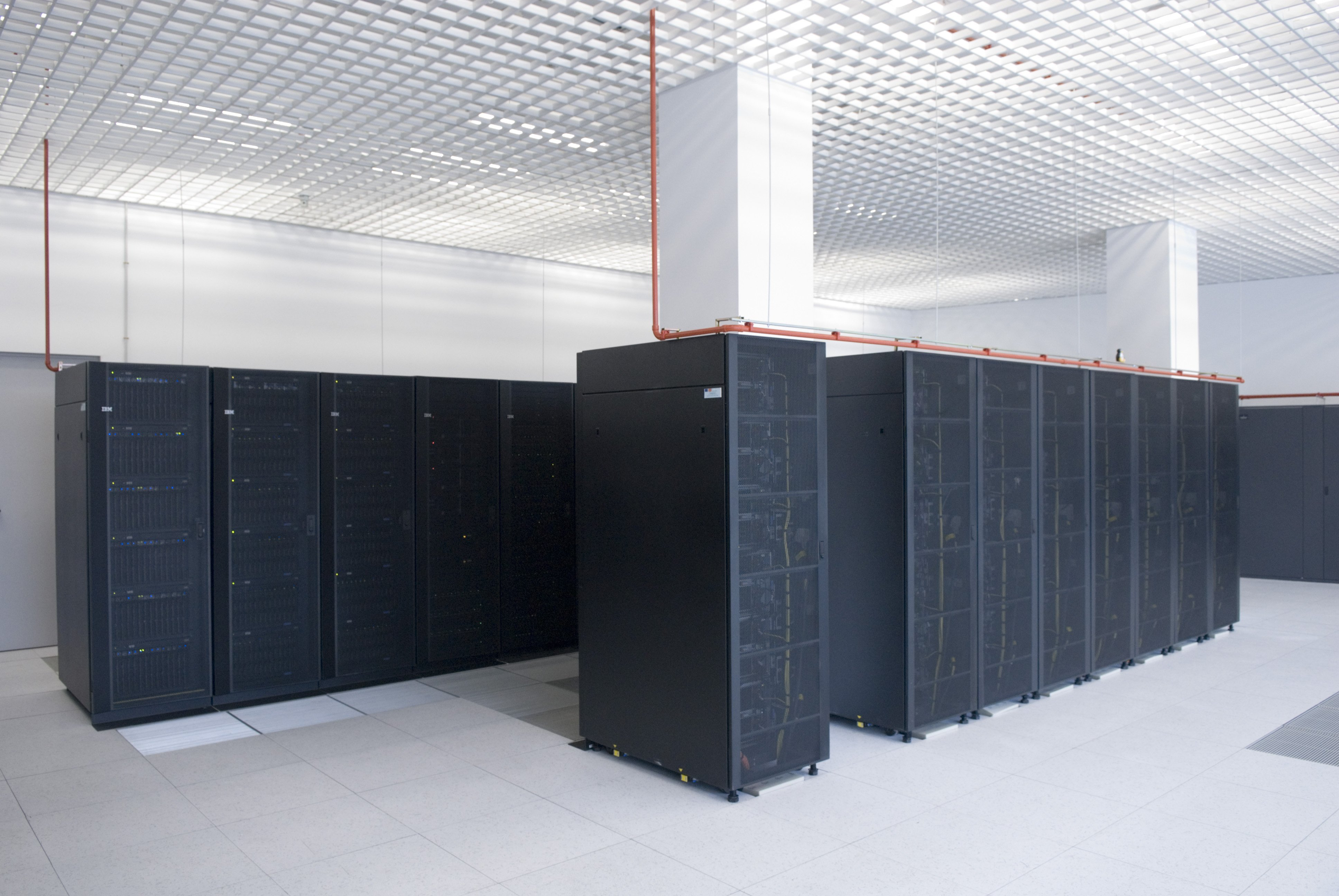
Magerit Supercomputer (CeSViMa)

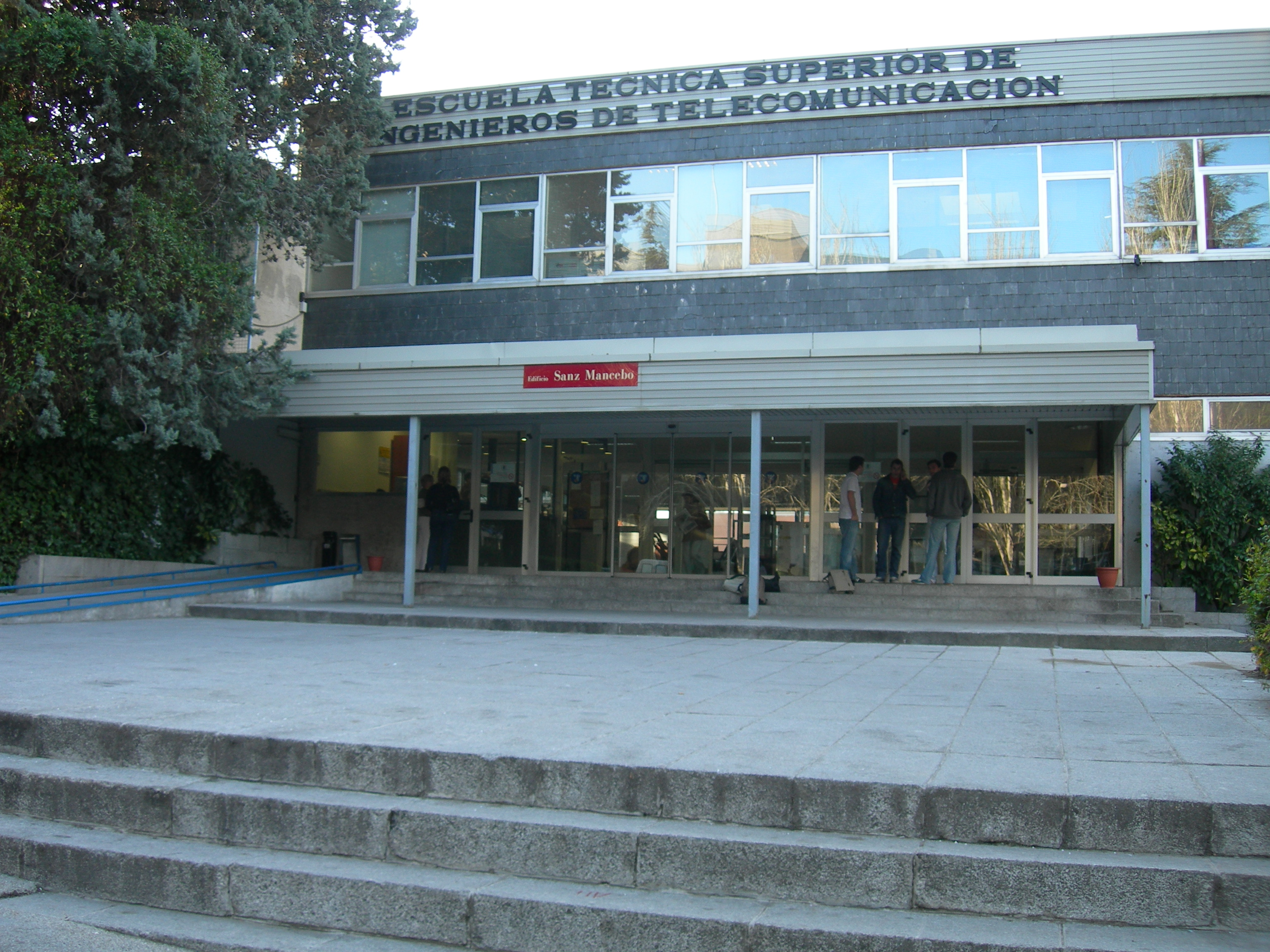
ETSIT entrance (Telecommunications Eng.)

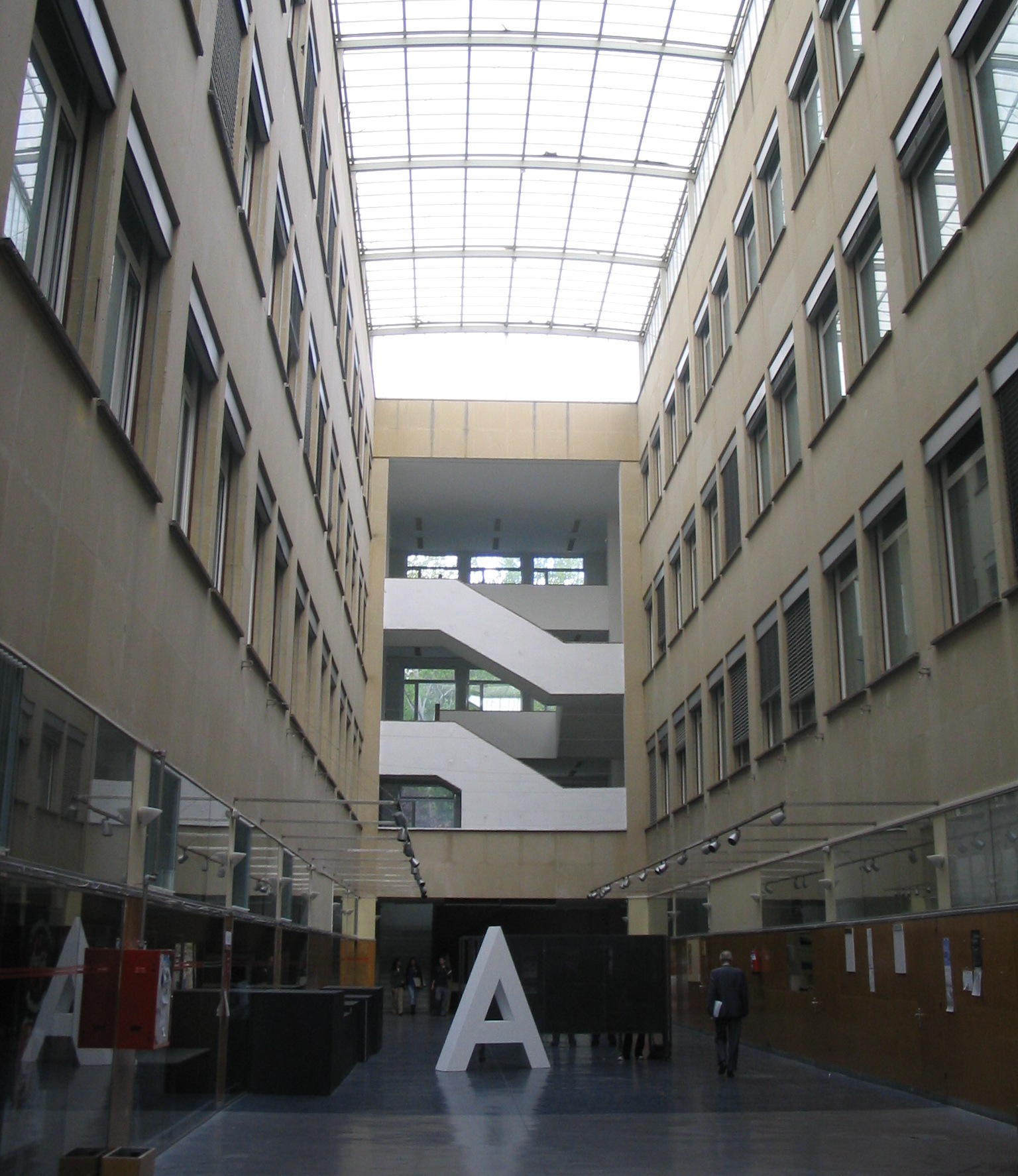
ETSAM insides (Architecture)

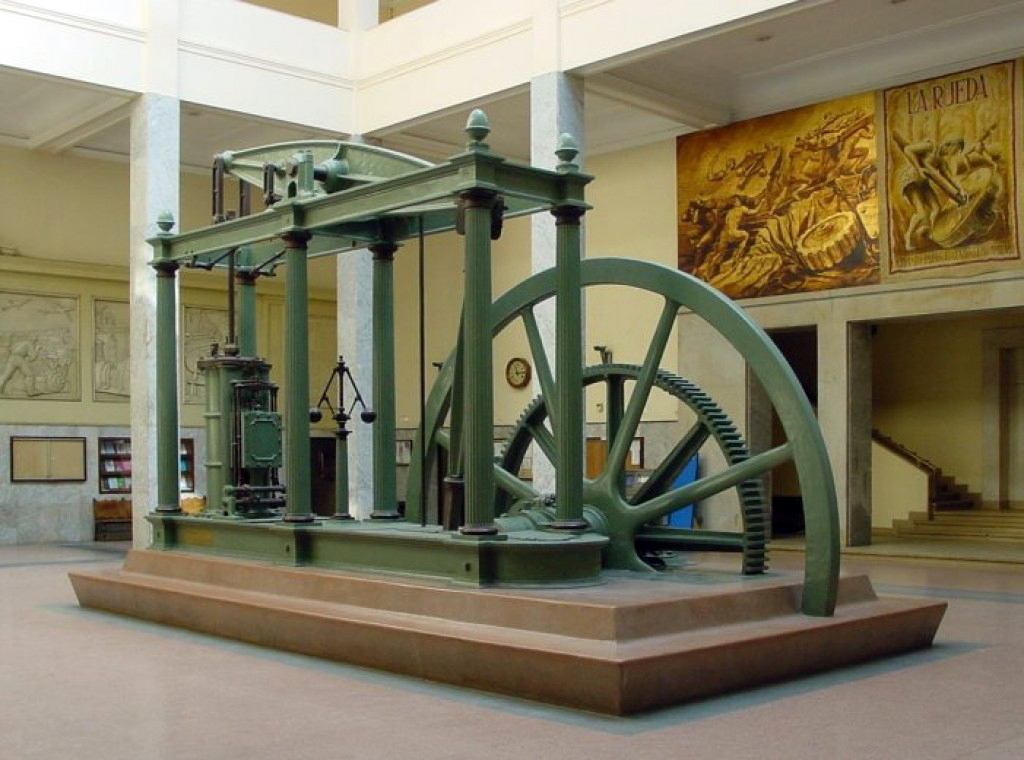
Watt's steam engine at ETSII (Industrial Eng.)

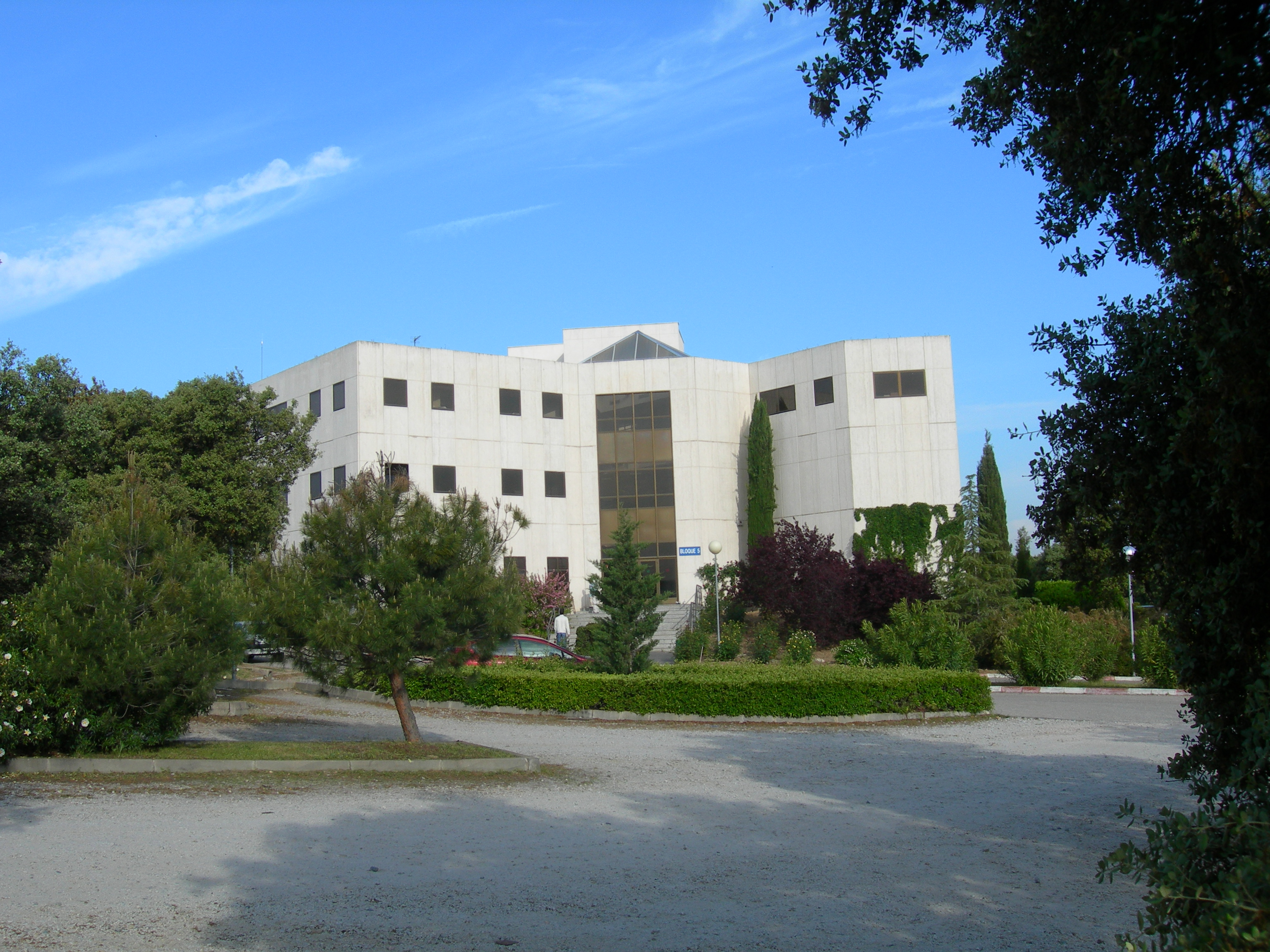
FI building (Computer Science Eng.)

== See also ==
- List of universities in Spain
- List of forestry universities and colleges
- List of test pilot schools
- Top Industrial Managers for Europe
