= Momentus space =

American aerospace company

Momentus Inc.
- Type: Public company
- Traded as: Nasdaq: MNTS
- Industry: Aerospace, In-orbit servicing, Space infrastructure
- Founded: 2017
- Founder: Mikhail Kokorich
- Headquarters: San Jose, California, U.S.
- Key people: John Rood (CEO)
- Products: Vigoride Orbital Service Vehicle
- Services: Satellite hosting, orbital transfer, autonomous rendezvous, in-space assembly
- Revenue: ▼$1.1 million (TTM, 2025)
- Number of employees: ~120 (2025)
- Website: momentus.space

Momentus Inc. (doing business as Momentus Space) is an American commercial space company headquartered in San Jose, California. The company designs and manufactures in-space infrastructure, providing services such as orbital transportation, hosted payloads, and in-orbit servicing for commercial and government clients.

The company is notable for its development of the Vigoride Orbital Service Vehicle (OSV), which utilizes proprietary Microwave Electrothermal Thrusters (MET) powered by water propellant. Originally focused on commercial satellite rideshare, Momentus transitioned under the leadership of former Under Secretary of Defense for Policy John Rood to focus on national security space and advanced orbital robotics, acting as a contractor for agencies including DARPA, NASA, and the United States Space Force.

== History ==
=== Founding and Early Operations (2017–2020) ===
Momentus was founded in 2017 by Mikhail Kokorich and Lev Khasis. The company gained early venture backing through Y Combinator and Prime Movers Lab based on its concept of a "space tug" that would transport small satellites from drop-off orbits provided by heavy-lift rockets to custom operational orbits using low-cost water plasma propulsion.

=== SPAC Merger and Regulatory Issues (2020–2022) ===
In October 2020, Momentus announced plans to become a public company via a SPAC merger with Stable Road Acquisition Corp. Prior to the merger's completion, the company faced significant regulatory intervention. The Committee on Foreign Investment in the United States (CFIUS) forced Kokorich, a Russian national, to step down due to national security concerns regarding foreign access to sensitive aerospace technology.

Concurrently, the U.S. Securities and Exchange Commission (SEC) charged Momentus and Stable Road with misleading investors regarding the success of a 2019 propulsion test. The company settled the charges for $7 million, overhauled its board of directors, and required the founders to divest their shares. Following compliance with a National Security Agreement (NSA), Momentus was cleared by the FAA to resume flight operations.

=== Defense Pivot and Stabilization (2023–Present) ===
In 2023, Momentus appointed John Rood as Chief Executive Officer. Under Rood's leadership, the company shifted its strategic focus toward complex government infrastructure projects, including autonomous rendezvous, proximity operations (RPO), and in-space assembly.

In January 2026, Momentus was selected as a qualified vendor for the Missile Defense Agency (MDA) SHIELD program, a multi-award contract vehicle with a $151 billion ceiling over ten years, marking the company's formal integration into major U.S. defense infrastructure planning.

== Facilities ==
Momentus is headquartered in San Jose, California. In early 2026, the company completed the transition to its new Automation and Manufacturing Facility. This facility houses the company's primary cleanrooms, MET thruster testing vacuum chambers, and a dedicated Mission Control Center for active orbital operations.

== Spacecraft and Technology ==
=== Vigoride Orbital Service Vehicle ===
The Vigoride is Momentus's primary spacecraft bus. Designed to launch as a payload on medium-to-heavy lift rockets (primarily the SpaceX Falcon 9 via the Transporter rideshare program), Vigoride operates in Low Earth orbit (LEO). Modern iterations of the Vigoride bus are capable of generating up to 3 kilowatts of peak solar power to support compute-heavy military sensors and robotic payloads.

=== Microwave Electrothermal Thruster (MET) ===
The Vigoride is propelled by a proprietary Microwave Electrothermal Thruster. The system uses solar arrays to power a microwave emitter, which turns liquid water propellant into superheated plasma. Water is utilized because it is non-toxic, easily stored without high-pressure cryogenic tanks, and presents a theoretical pathway for future in-situ resource utilization (ISRU) via asteroid or lunar ice mining.

== Flight History ==
List of Vigoride Missions
Mission	Launch Date	Launch Vehicle	Primary Payloads	Status
Vigoride-3	May 25, 2022	Falcon 9 (Transporter-5)	Multiple commercial CubeSats	Partial Success
Vigoride-5	January 3, 2023	Falcon 9 (Transporter-6)	Caltech SSPP	Success
Vigoride-7	March 30, 2026	Falcon 9 (Transporter-16)	DARPA NOM4D, NASA R5-S10	Operational
Vigoride-8	2027 (Planned)	Falcon 9	NASA Flight Opportunities	Planned

== Corporate governance ==
=== Board of directors ===
As of 2026, the Momentus board consists of members with deep backgrounds in U.S. national security and aerospace infrastructure:

- John Rood – Chairman and CEO (Former Under Secretary of Defense for Policy)
- Linda J. Reiners – Lead Independent Director (Former VP of Missile Defense at Lockheed Martin)
- Chris Hadfield – Director (Former Commander of the International Space Station)
- Brian Kabot – Director (Senior Advisor at Sterling Partners)
- Mitchel B. Kugler – Director (Former VP Corporate Strategy at Raytheon)
- Victorino Mercado – Security Director (Former Assistant Secretary of Defense for Strategy, Plans, and Capabilities)
- Kimberly A. Reed – Director (Former Chairman of the Export-Import Bank of the United States)

== See also ==
- In-orbit servicing
- Space tug
- Starfish Space
- Astroscale
