= Charlie Blackwell-Thompson =

American engineer and launch director

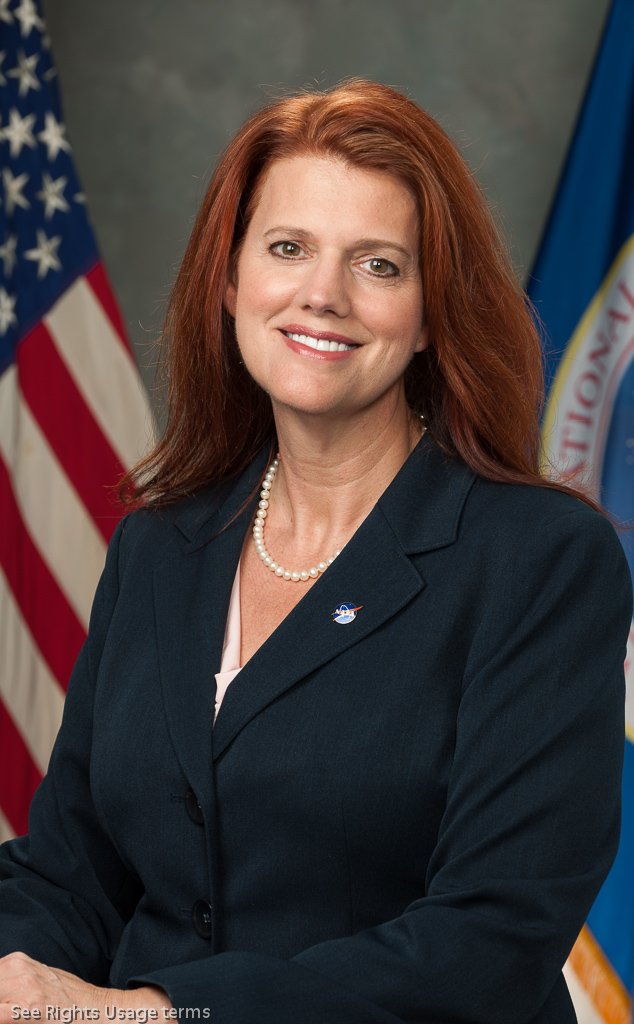
- NASA Portrait (2017)
- Born: Gaffney, South Carolina
- Education: Clemson University (BS)
- Employer: NASA
- Title: Launch Director for NASA's Exploration Ground Systems program

Charlie Blackwell-Thompson is an American engineer. Blackwell-Thompson is the launch director for NASA's Exploration Ground Systems Program, based at NASA's John F. Kennedy Space Center (KSC). She oversees the countdown and liftoff of NASA's Space Launch System (SLS) rocket and Orion spacecraft during Artemis missions, which includes its first flight test, Artemis I, as well as its first crewed mission around the Moon, Artemis II.

== Personal life and education ==
Blackwell-Thompson is a native of Gaffney, South Carolina, where she graduated from Gaffney High School.

As a child, Blackwell-Thompson watched the Saturn V launches and was inspired by the idea of exploration the astronauts were doing. Blackwell-Thompson earned her bachelor's degree of computer engineering from Clemson University in 1988. She credits her high school physics teacher, Doc Wilson, for encouraging her to look into engineering. Blackwell-Thompson visited a firing room in the Launch Control Center during her senior year at Clemson during her job interview; she wanted to work in that room.

Blackwell-Thompson resides in Merritt Island, Florida, with her husband and three children.

== Career ==
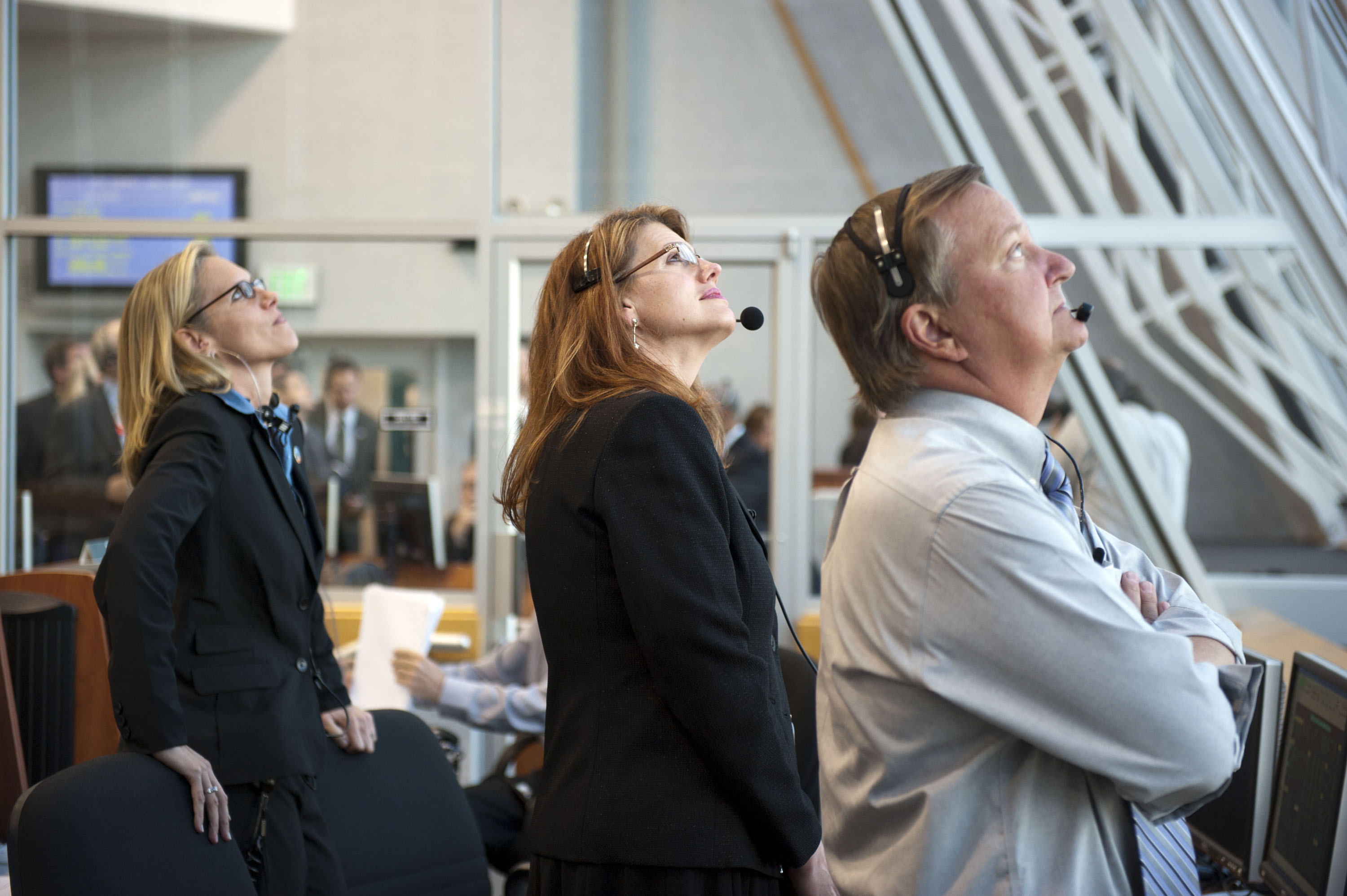
Blackwell-Thompson (center) watches the launch of Space Shuttle Discovery with Stephanie Stilson (left) and Mike Leinbach (right)

In 1988 she joined The Boeing Company as a payload flight software engineer at NASA's KSC. She also worked as the lead in the Electrical Integration Office and the ground operations integration lead engineer for the Orbital Space Plane.

Blackwell-Thompson began her NASA career in 2004 as a test director in the Launch and Landing Division. She served as the qualified tanking test director for multiple space shuttle missions. She served as the chief NASA test director from STS-130 until program completion. She also served as the assistant launch director for STS-133 and through numerous tanking tests. She served as the chief of Launch and Landing through the retirement of the Space Shuttle Program (SSP). Blackwell-Thompson worked on planning efforts for launch operations in the Constellation Program.

=== SLS/Orion/Exploration Ground Systems ===
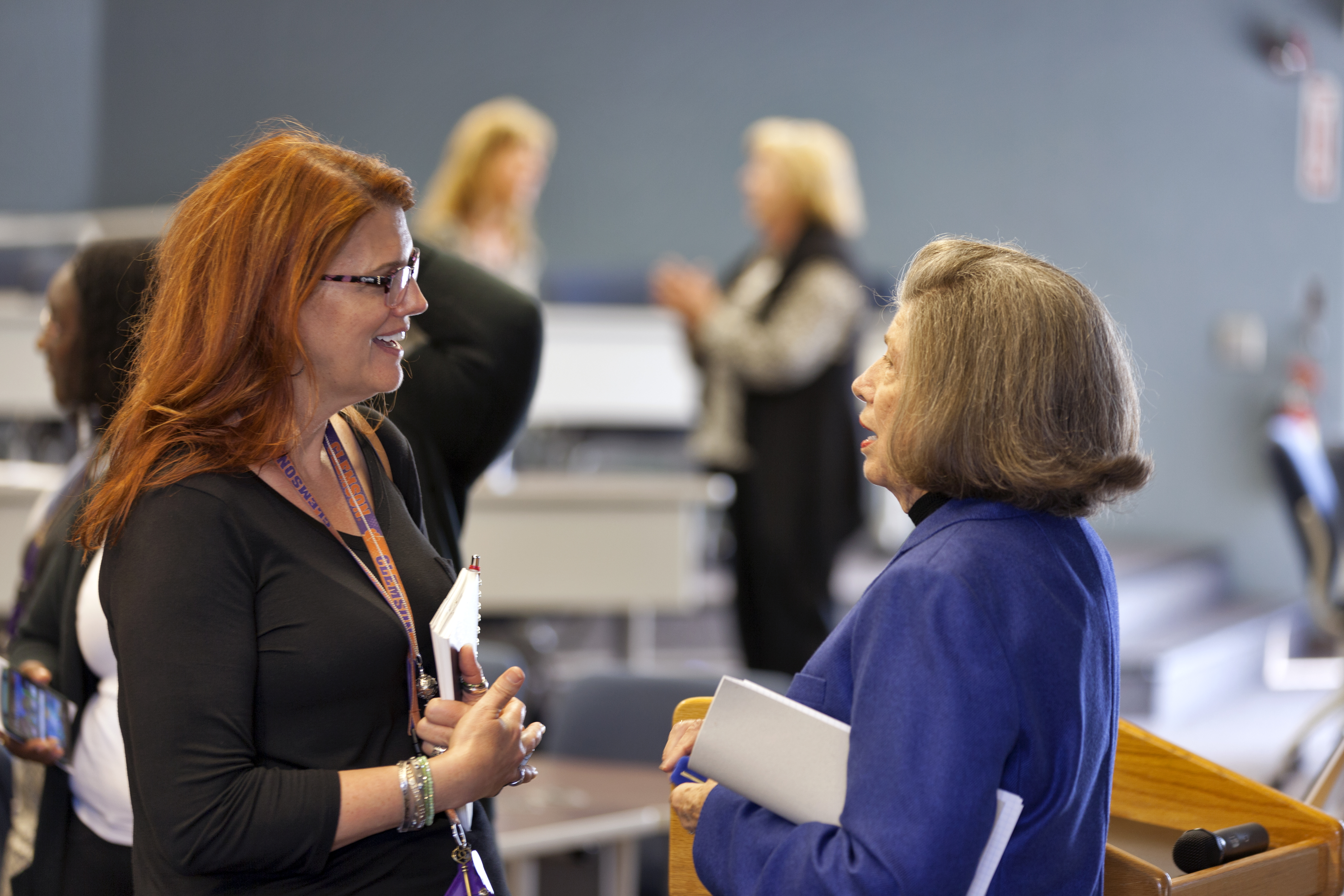
Apollo launch engineer JoAnn Morgan (right) speaks with Blackwell-Thompson (left)

Following the Space Shuttle's retirement, Blackwell-Thompson served as the Ground Systems Development Office's Test Management Branch chief. She led an operations team that developed the plans, procedures and processes for integrated testing, launch and recovery operations.

In 2016 she was named the Launch Director for SLS/Orion. She is the first woman to serve as a NASA launch director.

On launch day, Blackwell-Thompson oversees a launch team of 91 controllers, making the final determination for "go/no-go" (clear to proceed/not to proceed) for launch. The team includes veteran controllers from space shuttle processing and launches along with many newer engineers. She also leads a Support Launch Team about 60 people in a second firing room. She expects 30% of her team to be women engineers.

Blackwell-Thompson, in the Launch Control Center as the Space Launch System rocket for Artemis I rolls out, March 17, 2022

In 2019, Blackwell-Thompson led the launch team in performing training simulations inside Firing Room 1 of the Launch Control Center. The exercises certified the team was ready for launch and can work through any type of issue in real-time. On February 3, 2020, Blackwell-Thompson led the Artemis I launch team through a countdown simulation in Firing Room 1 of the Launch Control Center. In November 2020 she led a cryogenic propellant loading simulation.

In March 2021, a year into the COVID-19 pandemic, Blackwell-Thompson led the first exercise with the supporting NASA centers and the flight control team joining launch control to simulate launch together. She led another 12 additional simulations in 2021 prior to Artemis I's launch day.

On November 16, 2022, she directed the successful launch of Artemis I. On April 1, 2026, she directed the successful launch of Artemis II.

=== Patents ===
Blackwell-Thompson holds multiple patents related to launch vehicle interface standardization concepts and command and control methods and systems.
