= FraLine =

- Formation: 2001
- Location: Frankfurt, Hessen, DE
- Region served: Frankfurt
- Members: Schools
- Project Manager: Professor Dr Thomas Knaus
- Parent organization: University of Applied Science
- Affiliations: School Department of the City of Frankfurt
- Budget: non-profit
- Staff: 20
- Website: fraLine

fraLine is a non-profit (research) project of Research Center Frankfurt Technology Center Media - FTzM of Frankfurt University of Applied Sciences. Project and research activities focus on IT services management for schools and the use of digital media in educational settings. fraLine is also a joint project between the Frankfurt University of Applied Sciences and the city of Frankfurt am Main (represented by the "Stadtschulamt" = municipal school-maintaining body). fraLine and the city of Frankfurt cooperate in the fields of IT support and IT service management in educational contexts as well as technical implementation of digital media in class. fraLine also cooperates with the Hessian state education authority ("Staatliches Schulamt") in the field of media education and digital media training for teachers. fraLine was launched in 2001 by Professor Dr Thomas Knaus and employs mainly technical students of the Frankfurt University of Applied Sciences and Goethe University Frankfurt, but also IT professionals, engineers and media educators.

== Research and development projects ==
=== Projects ===
fraLine conducts research in the fields of IT service management according to ITIL recommendations as well as in the field of IT support and digital media use in educational contexts including educational software and media literacy. Research results and concepts are provided to the city of Frankfurt ("Stadtschulamt") for the improvement of information technology in schools and the establishment of a centrally managed school IT infrastructure in the municipal area. Therefore, fraLine also offers advisory services to the city of Frankfurt, to all municipal schools as well as other educational institutions on topics such as acquisition of computers or computer parts, hardware, IT security, remote service etc.

Research in technical areas is complemented by studies in media education. Results in the field of media education and current media projects are presented on the annual expert conference "fraMediale" which is hosted and organized by Research Center Frankfurt Technology Center Media - FTzM.

The FTzM developed the "fraDesk", a multi-user capable trouble ticket system for coordinating and documenting customer requests, incident reports or general processes based on division of labor. fraLine uses this software in its own everyday routine. The "fraDesk" is free software and was presented at the CeBIT 2008 in Hanover, Germany.

Other research projects conducted by fraLine employees include the development of standard resource administration and user management for schools, improvement of school support via remote maintenance and support, but also media educational topics such as content filtering, evaluation of educational software and media communication.

=== Knowledge base for teachers ===
fraLine publishes relevant information for schools as well as research results in the form of test reports and academic papers, a glossary, and a large set of FAQ. The FAQ database is a practical knowledge base Knowledge base and used as a point of reference for local teachers and others. It includes technical tutorials and information on the Frankfurt local school network, operating systems, software, hardware, peripheral equipment, the Internet, licenses and rights of utilization. Additionally, fraLine offers tutorials and introductory courses imparting theoretical and practical knowledge to school teachers and school IT representatives in Frankfurt.

== Support services for schools ==
The fraLine student team offers practical IT support to all 152 schools in Frankfurt by operating a telephone hotline, the Internet-based helpdesk "fraDesk" and through on-site service. Financed by public funds through the city of Frankfurt the service is free of charge for schools. It covers everyday troubleshooting relating to hardware and software, as well as software installation, actualisation and handling. In order to coordinate its support services, fraLine cooperates with so-called "IT representatives" in every school. They are appointed by their school principals and responsible for collecting IT-incidents and requests in their schools and communicating them to fraLine. Here, fraLine functions as first point of contact ("single-point-of-contact"). If problems cannot be solved by telephone, fraLine employees visit schools on-site or help them to refer their request to the competent authorities (e.g. school maintaining body ("Stadtschulamt"), or the Department of Information and Communicational Technology). It is sometimes criticized that IT-support carried out by students does not match the schools´ need for a "professional" support. On the other hand, only senior students who are identified as possessing the necessary qualifications are accepted at the project. In addition to the technical support, fraLine also offers training courses for teachers and school administration staff in the fields of IT-infrastructure and media use in educational contexts. As another way to support schools, fraLine launched the project "educational-technical assistance". As part of this project, fraLine employees accompany teachers during class offering them technical assistance with the digital media devices they plan to use in their lesson. The project aims at reducing technical insecurities of teachers and wants to promote a broader use of digital media in education.

== Partnerships, cooperations and awards ==
fraLine contributes to various multi-organisational and interdisciplinary initiatives in Frankfurt am Main, in the federal state of Hesse and in Germany responding to the growing demand for a sensible use of media in education. Thus, fraLine maintains close partnerships with its sister projects in Bremen and Hamburg. In 2007, fraLine was awarded with the "Germany – Land of Ideas" award. "Land of Ideas" is an initiative under the patronage of former German Federal President Horst Köhler. Public or private institutions that have developed innovations and ideas are nominated as so-called "landmarks in the land of ideas" for one year.
