= Thomas Knaus =

German educational scientist

Thomas Knaus (born 1974 in Frankfurt/Main) is a German educational scientist. He is a full-professor of Media Education at the Heidelberg University of Education and Honorary Professor for Educational Technology at the Faculty of Computer Science & Engineering at the Frankfurt University of Applied Sciences (Frankfurt UAS). He also work as an academic director of the FTzM in Frankfurt am Main. He served as a professor of pedagogy at the University of Erlangen-Nuremberg, as a professor of Educational Science specializing in Media Education and head of Department of Media Pedagogy, as well as a visiting professor at the University of Otago (Dunedin, New Zealand), at the University of Sydney (Australia) and at the University of Vienna (Austria). Before his academic career Knaus worked as a teacher and a media educator in extracurricular youth work in Frankfurt am Main and Bad Homburg.

== Research and projects ==
The primary focus of his research and work lies in the field of media education (media literacy; digital literacy; media literacy education in schools; methods and approaches in media research) and educational technology (digital change in educational institutions; AI in education (AIED), computer science and society, text and image in digital communication).

Knaus is the initiator and project manager of the cooperation projects fraLine (1999–2014) and fraMediale (since 2009). From 2011 to 2015 he was managing director of the Research Center Frankfurt Technology Center Media - FTzM, whose scientific director he is to this day. He is the initiator of the fraMediale Fair an the fraMediale Prize, publisher of the fraMediale book series in the kopaed publishing house and project manager of the open access publication project "Forschungswerkstatt Medienpädagogik" ("Research Workshop Media Education")

== Membership in scientific organizations ==
Knaus is a member of the steering group of the initiative "No Education without Media!" (Keine Bildung ohne Medien – KBoM!) and as well member of the board of the Association for Media Education and Communication Culture (GMK); he ist member of the German Informatics Society (GI), the German Educational Research Association (GERA | DGfE), and the Professional Group School (GMK) as well as a spokesperson for the Qualitative Research Section (GMK). He is co-author of the interdisziplinary working group "Dagstuhl/Frankfurt triangle for Education in the digitally networked World" and one of the supporters of the "Digital Education Charter" of the German Informatics Society.

== Selected publications ==
- Knaus, Thomas (2009): Kommunigrafie – Eine empirische Studie zur Bedeutung von Text und Bild in der digitalen Kommunikation, Munich: kopaed.
- Knaus, Thomas; Merz, Olga (2010–2020): Digitaler Wandel in Bildungseinrichtungen (Vol. 1–7), Munich: kopaed.
- Knaus, Thomas; Döring, Nicola; Ludewig, Yvonne (2013): Die Wirksamkeit von Medienbildungsinitiativen: Erfolge, Probleme und Lösungsansätze, In: MedienPädagogik (Suisse).
- Knaus, Thomas (2017): The Potential of Digital Media – Theoretical Observations on the Educational and Teaching Potential of Tablet Computers, New Zealand Journal of Teachers’ Work (ISSN 1176-6662), Vol. 14, Issue 1, pp. 40–49.
- Knaus, Thomas (2017/2018/2019): Media Pedagogy Research Workshop. Projects – Theories – Methods [Vol. 1|2|3], Munich: kopaed.
- Knaus, Thomas; Meister, Dorothee M.; Narr, Kristin (2018): Futurelab Medienpädagogik. Professionalisierung – Qualitätsentwicklung – Standards, Munich: kopaed.
- Brinda, Torsten; Brüggen, Niels; Diethelm, Ira; Knaus, Thomas; Kommer, Sven; Kopf, Christine; Missomelius, Petra; Leschke, Rainer; Tilemann, Friederike; Weich, Andreas (2019/2025): Frankfurt Triangle for Education in the Digital World - An Interdisciplinary Model [Frankfurt-Dreieck zur Bildung in der digital vernetzten Welt – Ein interdisziplinäres Modell]
- Knaus, Thomas (2020): Technology criticism and data literacy. The case for an augmented understanding of media literacy, In: Journal of Media Literacy Education, 12(3), 6-16. https://digitalcommons.uri.edu/jmle/vol12/iss3/
- Knaus, Thomas (2020): Don’t resign, design! – Towards a Pedagogy of the Digital, In: Australian Educational Computing (ACCE: AEC), 35/1, p. 1–20. http://journal.acce.edu.au/index.php/AEC/article/view/217
- Knaus, Thomas; Schmidt, Jennifer (2020): Medienpädagogisches Making – ein Begründungsversuch, In: MedienImpulse – Beiträge zur Medienpädagogik (University Vienna), ISSN 2307-3187, 58/4, p. 1–50. https://journals.univie.ac.at/index.php/mp/article/view/4322.
- Knaus, Thomas (2022): Making in media education: An activity-oriented approach to digital literacy, In: Journal of Media Literacy Education, 14(3), 53-65. https://digitalcommons.uri.edu/jmle/vol14/iss3/5/
- Knaus, Thomas; Junge, Thorsten; Merz, Olga (2022): Lehren aus der Lehre in Zeiten von Corona – Mediendidaktische Impulse für Schulen und Hochschulen, Munich: kopaed.
- Knaus, Thomas (2023): Emotions in Media Education: How media based emotions enrich classroom teaching and learning, In: Social Science & Humanities OPEN, 8 (1), pp. 1–6. https://doi.org/10.1016/j.ssaho.2023.100504
- Knaus, T., Merz, O., & Junge, T. (2023). 50 Jahre Medienkompetenz und kein bisschen weiter? Von der Kommunikativen Kompetenz zu DigComp (Editorial). Ludwigsburger Beiträge Zur Medienpädagogik, 23, 1–20.
- Knaus, T.; Merz, O.; Junge, T. (2024). Ist das Kunst… oder kann das die KI? Zum Verhältnis von menschlicher und künstlicher Kreativität. Ludwigsburger Beiträge Zur Medienpädagogik, 24, 1–24.
- Knaus, Thomas (2024): Educational Impulses for Redesigning (Online) Teaching in the Post-Pandemic World – A Discussion and Evaluation of Lessons Learned, Weizenbaum Journal of the Digital Society – WJDS, 4 (4), Special Issue: Education in the Digital World, S. 1–36. https://doi.org/10.34669/wi.wjds/4.4.2
- Knaus, Thomas (2025): Why AI matters for education—an exploration in seven arguments. ZfB (Springer Nature), pp. 1–21.
