= Exploration Ground Systems =

NASA program for launch vehicle support

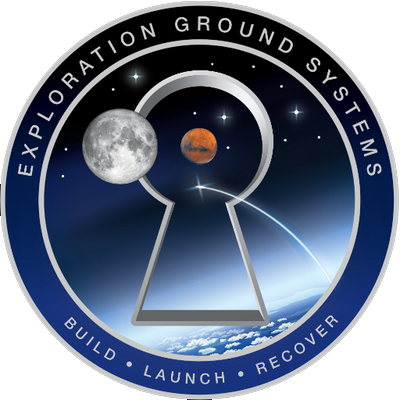
- Exploration Ground Systems logo

Program overview
- Country: United States
- Organization: NASA
- Status: Active

The Exploration Ground Systems (EGS) program was established to develop, modernize, and operate the ground infrastructure at NASA's Kennedy Space Center (KSC) in Florida required to process, assemble, transport, and launch rockets and spacecraft. The program supports NASA’s human spaceflight initiatives, including the Space Launch System (SLS) and the Orion spacecraft used in the Artemis program.

EGS is responsible for maintaining and adapting legacy Apollo- and Space Shuttle–era facilities, while also developing new systems to support evolving launch vehicle configurations. These efforts have included modifications to support SLS Block 1 missions, as well as planning for more advanced variants, although some upgrades have been revised or cancelled as program requirements have changed.

The program operates and maintains several major facilities and systems at KSC, including the Vehicle Assembly Building, where rockets are vertically integrated; the Launch Control Center, which houses the firing rooms used for launch operations; and the Crawler-Transporter fleet (CT-1 and CT-2), which transports mobile launchers and rockets to the launch pad. EGS also manages mobile launch platforms, including Mobile Launcher-1 (ML-1), while construction of Mobile Launcher-2 (ML-2) was halted following changes to SLS program requirements. Launch operations are conducted from Launch Complex 39B, which has been modernized to support Artemis missions.

== History ==
EGS was originally entitled the Ground Systems Development and Operations (GSDO) Program. It has its roots in the Constellation program (2005-2010), but only took control of assets and commenced operations under SLS (from 2010). For example, after the final launch of the Space Shuttle, GSDO took responsibility for LC-39A. However, there were no plans to use this pad, and basic maintenance was costing millions per year. In 2013, NASA signed a long-term lease of LC-39A to SpaceX. Blue Origin filed a protest to the Government Accountability Office that the pad should not be made exclusive, and should be operated by a tenant that would sublease to multiple different users and rockets to take advantage of. However, the GAO rejected this petition and allowed the lease to SpaceX, as there was no stated preference by NASA for or against a multiuser approach.

EGS was intended in general to "support several different kinds of spacecraft and rockets that are in development ... unlike previous work focusing on a single kind of launch vehicle, such as the Saturn V or Space Shuttle ... EGS's mission is to transform the center from a historically government-only launch complex to a spaceport that can handle several different kinds of spacecraft and rockets—both government and commercial.". The other LC-39 pad, LC-39B, specifically was intended to support multiple users. However, as time went on, the alternate launch vehicles that were to use LC-39B were all eventually removed from the plan or canceled entirely, such as Liberty and OmegA. OmegA was the final removal, with its cancellation and planned demolition of its launch tower in September 2020. This leaves EGS solely focused on supporting the Space Launch System and Orion spacecraft, meaning LC-39B will enjoy at most one launch per year under current launch manifests. In the end, LC-39A is leased exclusively to SpaceX, and LC-39B will be used exclusively by SLS for the foreseeable future.

Charlie Blackwell-Thompson serves as launch director for NASA's Exploration Ground Systems Program. She will oversee the countdown and liftoff of NASA's Space Launch System rocket and Orion spacecraft. Named to the position in January 2016, Blackwell-Thompson is NASA's first female launch director.

== Launch platforms ==
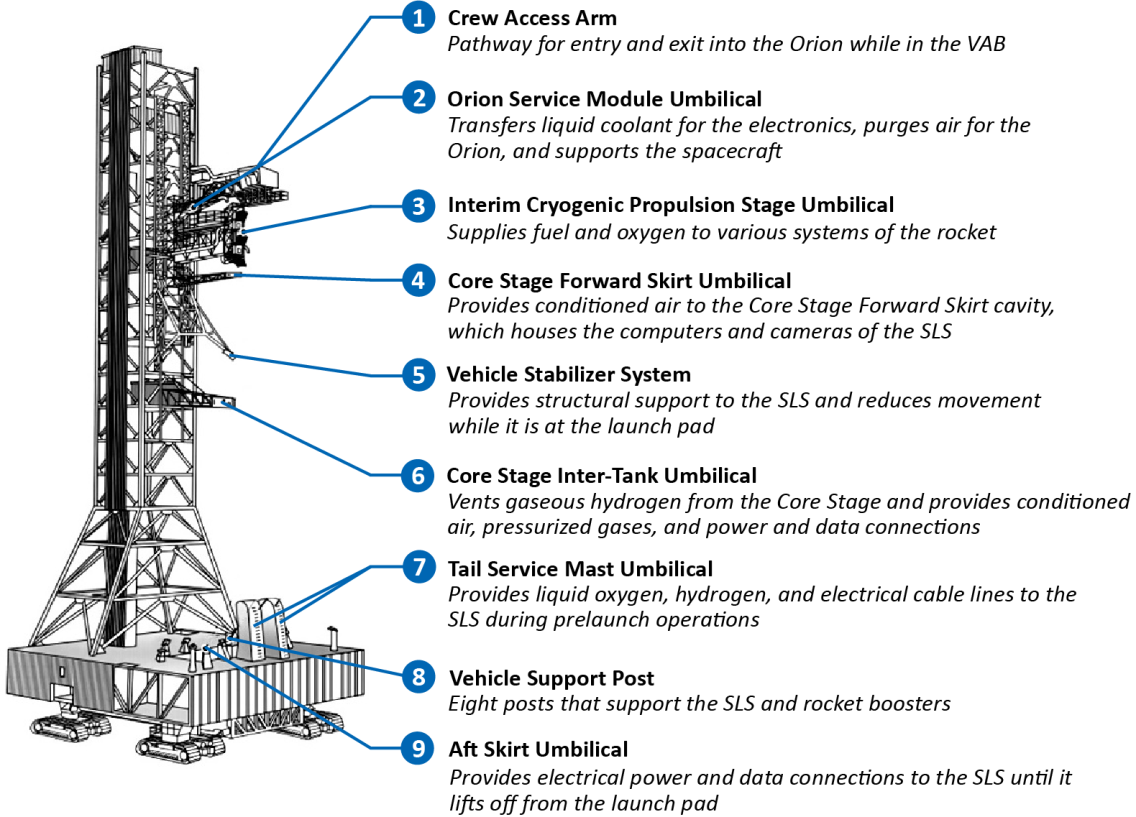
ML-1 structure, umbilicals, and accessories

One of the primary activities of EGS has been to prepare all infrastructure needed to launch SLS. SLS will use a mobile launcher platform, which is a launch structure that moves out with the rocket to the launch pad (LC-39B), carried atop a crawler transporter.

=== ML-1 for SLS Block 1 ===
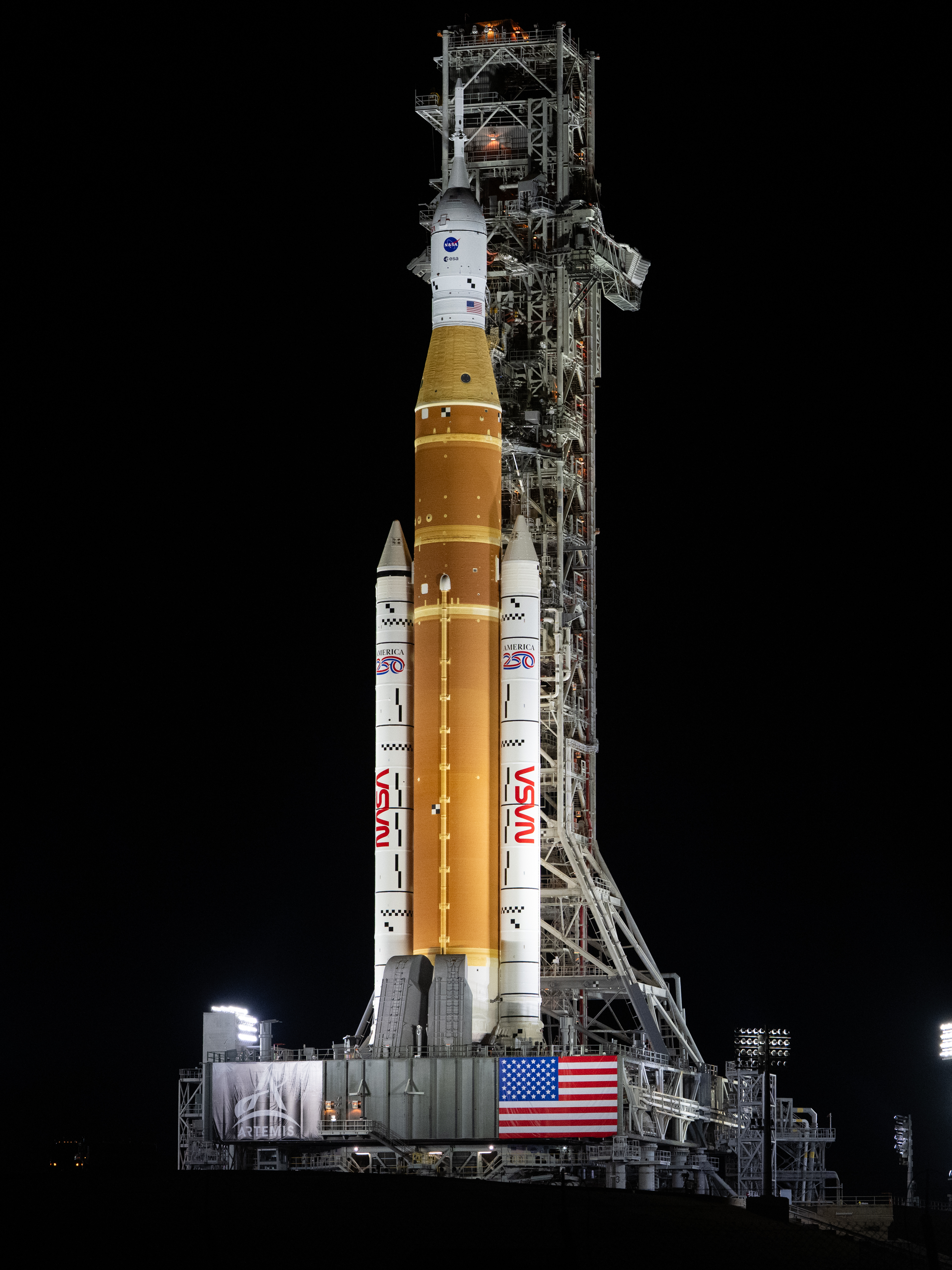
The SLS rocket for Artemis II atop ML-1 at Launch Complex 39B in January 2026

Under the Constellation program, a new platform was constructed, called Mobile Launcher-1 (ML-1), for the Ares I. This initial construction was completed in August 2010, at a cost of $234 million. After the cancellation of Constellation and the beginning of SLS, NASA decided to modify ML-1 for SLS. In August 2011, it was estimated that modifying ML-1 would cost $54M, modifying the old Space Shuttle launch platform would cost $93M, and building a brand new platform would cost $122M. However, in March 2020, a report from the NASA Inspector General came out, stating that ML-1 is running 3 years behind schedule and had cost $927M in total ($234M for the initial construction for Ares, and $693M for adapting it for SLS). The program manager of EGS stated in January 2020 that: "The EGS team has finished mobile launcher testing at the launch pad and will finish testing at the VAB in January. At that point, all of the launch infrastructure will be tested and ready for operations." ML-1 is only tall enough to be used for Block 1 of the SLS, so the current manifest calls for it to be used for three missions: Artemis 1 through 3, with the first to be launched in November 2022. Following the launch of Artemis 1 on November 16, 2022, ML-1 sustained minor damage to some components with two elevator doors having been blown out.

=== ML-2 for SLS Block 1B/2 (cancelled) ===
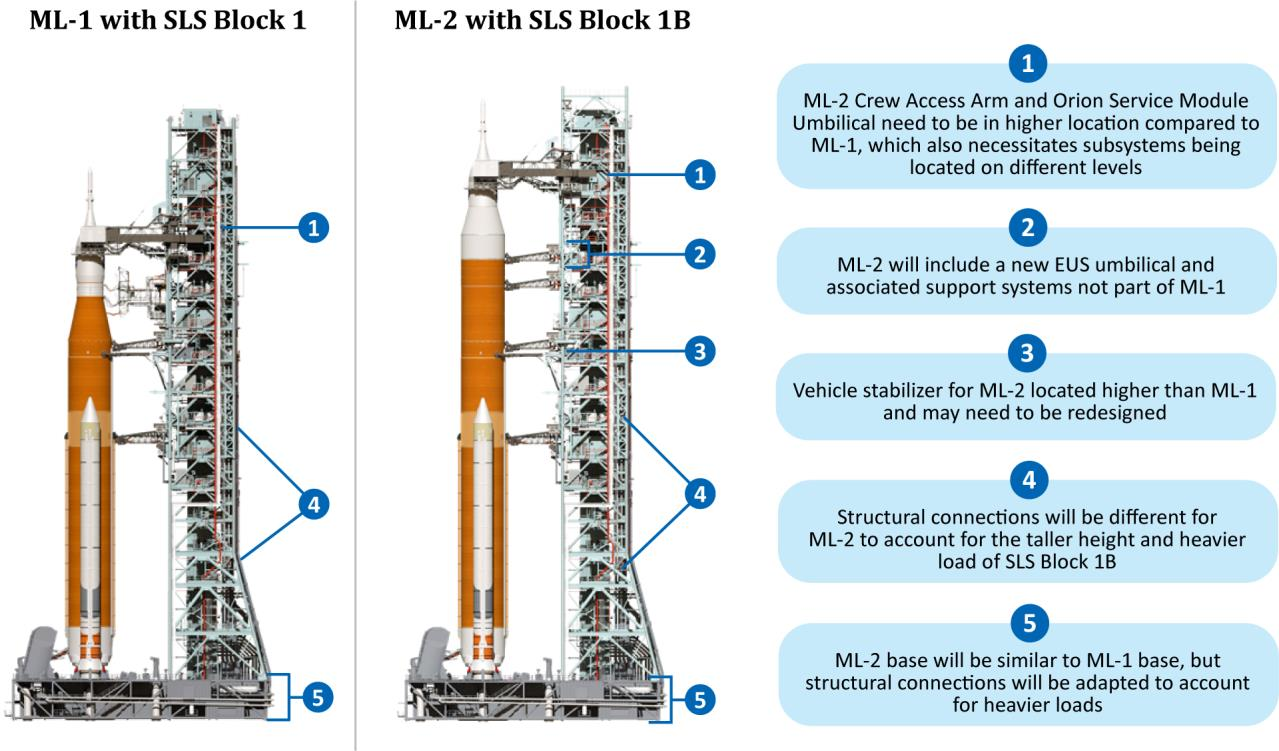
Comparison between ML-1 and planned ML-2

In October 2017, NASA determined that modifying Mobile Launcher-1 (ML-1) to support the larger SLS Block 1B and Block 2 configurations would be impractical, as the required upgrades would introduce an estimated 33-month gap between launches. Instead, the agency elected to construct a second mobile launcher (ML-2) specifically designed for future SLS variants. Congress appropriated $350 million for the project in 2018, and in 2019 NASA awarded a $383 million, 44-month contract to Bechtel, with completion initially scheduled for March 2023. Construction of ML-2 began in July 2020.

ML-2 was intended to support SLS Block 1B and Block 2 variant, both of which featured a taller configuration than Block 1 due to the Exploration Upper Stage (EUS). This required a higher crew access arm and redesigned umbilical connections to accommodate the different second stage. NASA anticipated fewer development challenges compared to ML-1, citing the incorporation of lessons learned. For example, following recommendations in a June 2019 Government Accountability Office report, NASA adopted integrated 3D modeling tools to improve design coordination, manage requirement changes, and enhance overall design maturity prior to construction.

The total cost of ML-2 was originally estimated at under $500 million. However, the project experienced significant cost growth and schedule delays. By December 2023, NASA revised its estimate to approximately $1.5 billion—including $1.3 billion for the Bechtel contract—and delayed the expected delivery date to November 2026. In June 2024, NASA revised its estimate to approximately $1.8 billion, with a delivery date of September 2027, while maintaining expectations that Bechtel adhere to the December 2023 cost and schedule targets.

A 2024 report by the NASA Office of Inspector General (IG) found that total costs could increase further, estimating that the project could reach approximately $2.7 billion by completion—more than three times the original projection. The report also concluded that ML-2 would likely not be ready to support a launch until at least 2029, after post-delivery preparations, exceeding the planned timeline for Artemis IV, the first mission scheduled to use SLS Block 1B. The IG attributed much of the cost growth and delays to contractor performance, noting that Bechtel had incurred significant overruns and underestimated the project’s scope and complexity, resulting in increased labor, equipment, and administrative costs. Ongoing technical challenges included steel fabrication and delivery issues and potential structural modifications that could increase the launcher’s weight and further drive up costs.

By early 2026, more than $1 billion had been spent, and the launcher was estimated to be approximately 90 percent complete. In February 2026, NASA cancelled the SLS Block 1B and Block 2 variants, eliminating the primary need for ML-2 and rendering it surplus to the Artemis program. Amid continued delays and cost increases, NASA announced in March 2026 that it no longer planned to use ML-2. On March 29, 2026, the agency confirmed that a stop-work order had been issued to Bechtel, halting construction. Components common to ML-1 are to be removed from ML-2 for use as spares.

== Milestones ==
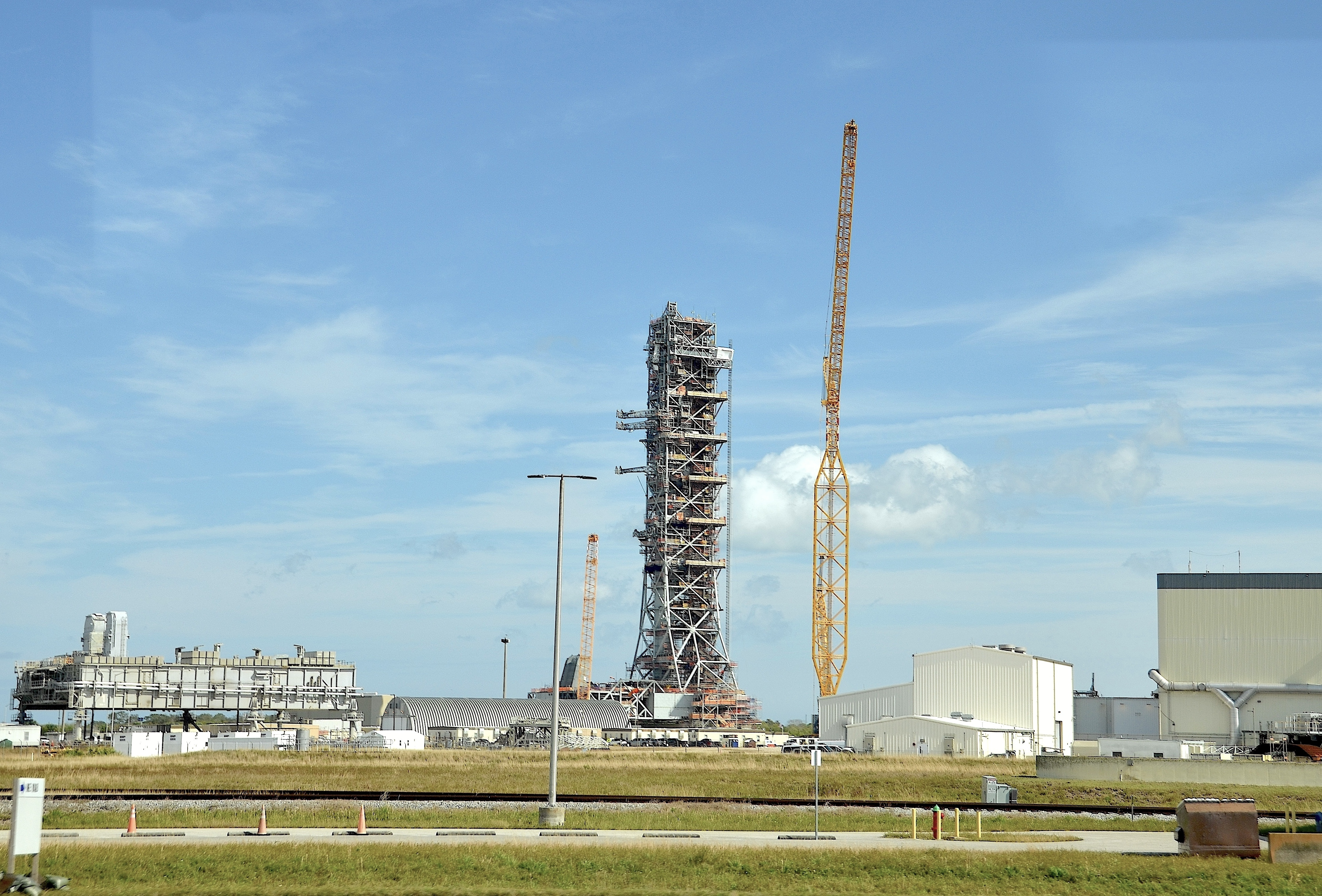
ML-2 under construction in January 2026

August 31, 2018 – The Mobile Launcher Platform (MLP) arrives at Launch Pad 39B. The ML underwent a fit check, followed by several days of systems testing.

September 8, 2018 – The MLP, atop Crawler-transporter 2, moves into the VAB for the first time.

October 17, 2018 – The first high speed retract test was completed on the Orion Service Module Umbilical (OSMU) on the MLP. The test verified umbilical arm alignment, rotation speed, and latch back systems. The OSMU will transfer power, data, and coolant for the electronics, and purge air for the environmental controls to the Orion service module and Launch Abort System.

October 30 – November 6, 2018 – Underway Recovery Test-7 (URT-7) was conducted in the Pacific Ocean. URT-7 is one in a series of tests that the Exploration Ground Systems Recovery Team, along with the U.S. Navy, are conducting to verify and validate procedures and hardware that will be used to recover the Orion spacecraft after it lands in the Pacific Ocean following deep space exploration missions.

November 19, 2018 – The Crew/Service Module Mock-up and Orion Transportation Pallet (OTP) were successfully moved to the Servicing Stand, as part of the Handling and Access (H&A) subsystem Verification and Validation testing at the Multi-Payload Processing Facility (MPPF). This testing allowed the Exploration Ground Systems (EGS) team to verify access to several servicing panels on the Orion vehicle, which will be needed to prepare Orion for Artemis 1.

December 14, 2018 – Successful countdown demonstration completed, intended to validate the launch team's capability to perform an Artemis 1 countdown and respond to challenges put into the system for practice.

April 15, 2019 – Exploration Ground Systems' launch team completed their first formal training simulation that will certify the team for the inaugural launch of the Space Launch System (SLS) and Orion spacecraft. The team, led by Launch Director Charlie Blackwell-Thompson, performed a countdown simulation of loading the SLS with liquid oxygen and hydrogen — complete with surprise issues the team had to work real-time.

July 25, 2019 – A flow test of the Ignition Overpressure Protection and Sound Suppression water deluge system was conducted on the mobile launcher at Launch Pad 39B. Modifications were made to the pad after a previous wet flow test, increasing the performance of the system.

May 6, 2020 – Launch Pad 39B at NASA's Kennedy Space Center in Florida is the site of NASA's return to the Moon and is now ready for Artemis 1—an uncrewed mission around the Moon and back. Exploration Ground Systems (EGS) has completed modifications and upgrades to the launch pad for the Space Launch System (SLS) rocket and Orion spacecraft to help accomplish NASA's lunar exploration goals.

April 27, 2021 – The last component of Artemis 1, the Space Launch System core stage, arrives at Kennedy Space Center, where EGS will spend the next ~10 months putting the whole vehicle together and running tests.

October 20, 2021 – The Artemis I Space Launch System vehicle assembly is complete. The Orion spacecraft that will fly to the Moon on NASA's Artemis 1 mission was lifted atop its Space Launch System (SLS) rocket on October 20, completing major assembly of the full vehicle stack in High Bay 3 of the Vehicle Assembly Building at Kennedy Space Center.

August 29, 2022 – The first launch attempt of Artemis 1, the Space Launch System and Orion spacecraft, is conducted at Kennedy Space Center, during a two-hour window that opened at 8:33 a.m. EDT (1233 GMT).

November 16, 2022, 1:47 a.m. – The successful launch of Artemis 1, the Space Launch System and Orion spacecraft, takes place at Kennedy Space Center. This first flight test of the world’s most powerful rocket sent an uncrewed Orion spacecraft to lunar orbit and back in preparation for sending humans to live and work on the Moon.

May 9, 2024 - Substantial progress on ML-2, which will be used for SLS Block 1B.

== See also ==
- Artemis program
- List of Artemis missions
