= Gerhard Schulmeyer =

German American businessman (born 1938)

Gerhard Hans Schulmeyer (born 1938) is a German American businessman. From 1994 until 1998, he was president and chief executive officer of Siemens Nixdorf in Germany, and between 1999 and December 2001, he was president and CEO of Siemens Corporation in the United States.

Since January 2002 he has been Professor of Practice at the MIT Sloan School of Management. He serves on the board of directors of Alcan Inc., Zurich Financial Services, and Korn/Ferry International.

Schulmeyer graduated from the Frankfurt University of Applied Sciences with a B.Sc. in electronic engineering and from the University of Frankfurt am Main with a B.Sc. in international business. He also holds a Master's degree in Management (M.B.A.) from the Sloan Fellows program of the MIT Sloan School of Management.
