= Sloan Fellows =

World's first senior and mid-career master's degree in management

The Sloan Fellows program is a middle and senior-career master's degree program in general management and leadership offered at the Massachusetts Institute of Technology, Stanford University, and London Business School (LBS).

Initially supported by a grant from Alfred P. Sloan, formerly CEO of General Motors, the program was established in 1930 at the now MIT Sloan School of Management. It was expanded to the Stanford Graduate School of Business (GSB) in 1957, and London Business School in 1968.

Considered to be one of the most prestigious management training programs in the world, it targets experienced and established leaders. Notable alumni include Kofi Annan, former United Nations Secretary-General and Nobel Peace Prize Laureate; John Browne, Baron Browne of Madingley, former chairman and CEO of BP and member of the British House of Lords; and Carly Fiorina, former CEO of Hewlett-Packard.

== History ==
The Sloan Fellows Program was created at the MIT Sloan School of Management in 1930, by Alfred P. Sloan, Chairman of General Motors from 1937 to 1956. Sloan envisioned the program as a means of developing the "ideal manager". The Sloan Fellows Program is the world's first general management and leadership education program for mid-career experienced managers.

In the following decades, the program was expanded to include masters degree programmes at the Stanford Graduate School of Business in 1957, and London Business School in 1968.

In 2013, Stanford changed the name of its Sloan programme from the Stanford Sloan Master's to the Master of Science in Management for Experienced Leaders (Stanford MSx).

== Academics ==
The program is delivered full-time over the course of 12–14 months, depending on electives. LBS and MIT Sloan offer an optional research thesis.

In addition to the standard management curriculum, the Sloan program contains a personal development component designed to develop the leadership and strategic thinking capabilities of Fellows.

The LBS program emphasises strategy, leadership and personal development.

== Admission ==
Admission to the Sloan Fellow programs is highly selective. Fellows comprise a mix of company and self-sponsored candidates. At all three schools, a significant degree of experience is required for admission.

At MIT, the admissions process involves resume screening followed by a 30-minute phone orientation. Prospective applicants are also invited to visit the program in Cambridge, Massachusetts for class visits, to engage with current students and meet the program officers.

After the initial screening, applicants submit a formal application, which includes undergraduate transcripts, GMAT or GRE score report, letters of recommendation, and personal essays. The received applications are screened by the admissions committee, and selected applicants are invited for a formal admissions interview, usually held on campus, or via video conference for international students. Following the interview, admissions decisions are made and applicants are notified. This process is repeated three times for three rounds of application deadlines.

== Comparison against traditional MBA ==
	Typical U.S.-based MBA program	Sloan Fellows program
Duration	Full-time, 2-year	Full-time, 1-year
Average work experience	4-year	13-year, 8-year minimum
Average age (80%)	25 - 30	30 - 40
International students	~40%	~60%
Class size	between 400 and 1000	between 50 and 110
Degree	MBA	Master of Science in Management (GSB, LBS) MBA (MIT)

== Differences between programs ==
	MIT Sloan School of Management	Stanford Graduate School of Business	London Business School
Year Founded	1930	1957	1968
Minimum experience	10 years	8 years	15 years
Average experience	14 years	12 years	18 years
Class size	~110	~80	~60
Passports	~35	~30	~25
Tuition	$136,135	$132,900	£99,950
Degree	MBA or MS in Management or Management of Technology	MS in Management (MSM)	MSc in Leadership and Strategy

== Alumni ==
=== MIT ===
- F. Duane Ackerman ('78), former chairman and CEO of BellSouth
- Thad Allen, former Commandant of the U.S. Coast Guard
- Kofi Annan ('72), former Secretary-General of the United Nations and winner of Nobel Peace Prize in 2001
- Megan J. Brennan ('03), 74th United States Postmaster General, CEO of United States Postal Service
- Patrick R. Donahoe ('93), 73rd United States Postmaster General, CEO of United States Postal Service
- John E. Potter ('95), 72nd United States Postmaster General, CEO of United States Postal Service
- Chan Chun Sing ('05), Minister in Prime Minister's Office and the Secretary-General of the National Trades Union Congress, Singapore
- Colby Chandler, former chairman and CEO of Kodak
- Philip M. Condit ('75), former chairman and CEO of Boeing
- Carly Fiorina, former CEO of Hewlett-Packard
- John Legere, ('91) CEO of T-Mobile US
- Donald V. Fites ('71), former chairman and CEO of Caterpillar Inc
- William Clay Ford, Jr. ('84), Chairman of Ford Motor Company
- James C. Foster ('85), Chairman and CEO of Charles River Laboratories
- Gan Siow Huang ('10), first Singaporean female general
- Bruce S. Gordon ('88), former president and CEO of NAACP
- Daniel Hesse, President and CEO of Sprint Nextel
- Robert Horton ('71), British businessman and former chairman and CEO of BP
- Robert Lawrence Kuhn ('80), China expert, corporate strategist, and public intellectual
- Nabiel Makarim ('85), former Minister of Environment of Indonesia
- Alan Mulally ('82), former president and CEO of Ford Motor Company
- Abdullatif bin Ahmed Al Othman ('98), Governor of Saudi Arabia's General Investment Authority (SAGIA)
- David Pekoske, 7th Administrator of the Transportation Security Administration and former Vice Commandant of the U.S. Coast Guard
- William A. Porter, co-founder of E*TRADE
- Gerhard Schulmeyer, former president and CEO of Siemens
- Keiji Tachikawa ('78), President of the Japan Aerospace Exploration Agency
- John W. Thompson ('83), Chairman of Symantec
- Ron Williams ('84), CEO and Chairman of Aetna

=== Stanford ===
- William Amelio ('89), President and CEO, Lenovo Group (China)
- Scott Brady ('00), founder and CEO, Fiber Tower and Slice (US)
- Lord John Browne of Madingley ('81), Chairman and CEO of BP, Member of the British House of Lords (UK)
- Sir Howard Davies ('80), Director, London School of Economics, and Deputy Governor, Bank of England (UK)
- Paul Deneve ('10), CEO, Yves Saint Laurent (France)
- Thomas Falk ('89), Chairman, president and CEO, Kimberly-Clark (US)
- Chris Gibson-Smith ('85), Chairman, London Stock Exchange (UK)
- Alan Giles ('88), CEO, HMV (UK)
- Brigadier General Lee Hsien Yang ('80), CEO, Singtel (Singapore)
- Hon. Regina Ip ('87), Secretary for Security, Government of Hong Kong
- Robert Joss ('66), CEO, Westpac Bank (Australia), and Dean, Stanford Graduate School of Business (US)
- Dan Macklin ('11), Co-founder, SoFi (US)
- Sir Deryck Maughan ('78), Managing Director and Chairman, KKR Asia, former CEO of Citigroup International (US)
- Sir Callum McCarthy ('82), Chairman, Financial Services Authority (UK)
- Hank McKinnell ('68), Chairman and CEO, Pfizer (US)
- Gary Mekikian, Co-founder and CEO, M&M Media Inc, (US)
- JoAnn H. Morgan ('77), Senior Executive, NASA (US)
- Daniel Novegil ('84), CEO, Ternium (Argentina)
- John Robert Porter ('81), Chairman, Telos Group (Belgium)
- Mark Pigott ('95), Chairman and CEO, Paccar (US)
- Frank Shrontz (1970), Chairman, Boeing (US)
- Karl Slym, CEO, Tata Motors (UK)
- Min Zhu, Co-founder and President and Chief Technical Officer, WebEx (US)
- Patti Poppe (‘05), CEO, PG&E

=== LBS ===
- Mary Curnock-Cook (2002), Chief Executive Universities & Colleges Admissions Service
- Tomáš Drucker (2023), Minister of Education and Minister of Health, Slovakia
- Jitesh Gadhia (2000), Senior Advisor, Blackstone Group
- Gillian Keegan (2010) Secretary of State for Education, United Kingdom
- Leong Mun Wai (1992), Non-Constituency Member of Parliament, Singapore
