= Colby Chandler (CEO) =

American businessman (died 2021)

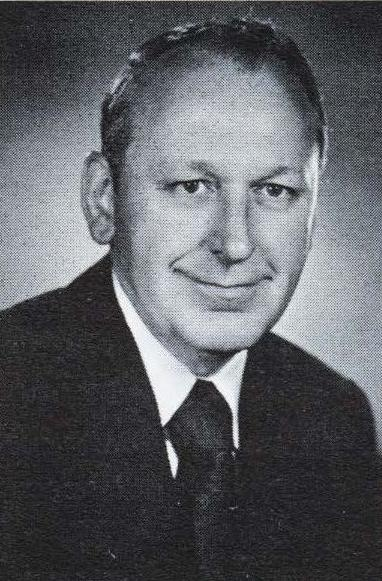
- Chandler circa 1974
- Born: 1925 or 1926
- Died: March 4, 2021
- Education: University of Maine; MIT Sloan School of Management (MBA)
- Employer: Kodak

Colby Hackett Chandler (1925/6 – March 4, 2021) was the chairman and chief executive officer of the Eastman Kodak Company.

He was a graduate of the University of Maine and received his master's degree in management (M.B.A.) from the Sloan Fellows program of the MIT Sloan School of Management.

Chandler was also a member of the board of trustees of the Rochester Institute of Technology (RIT). He joined the board in 1974, and served as chairman of the board from 1992 to 1994.

Business positions
Preceded by Walter A. Fallon	CEO of Eastman Kodak; May 1983 – June 1990	Succeeded by Kay R. Whitmore
