= JoAnn H. Morgan =

American aerospace engineer

JoAnn Hardin Morgan
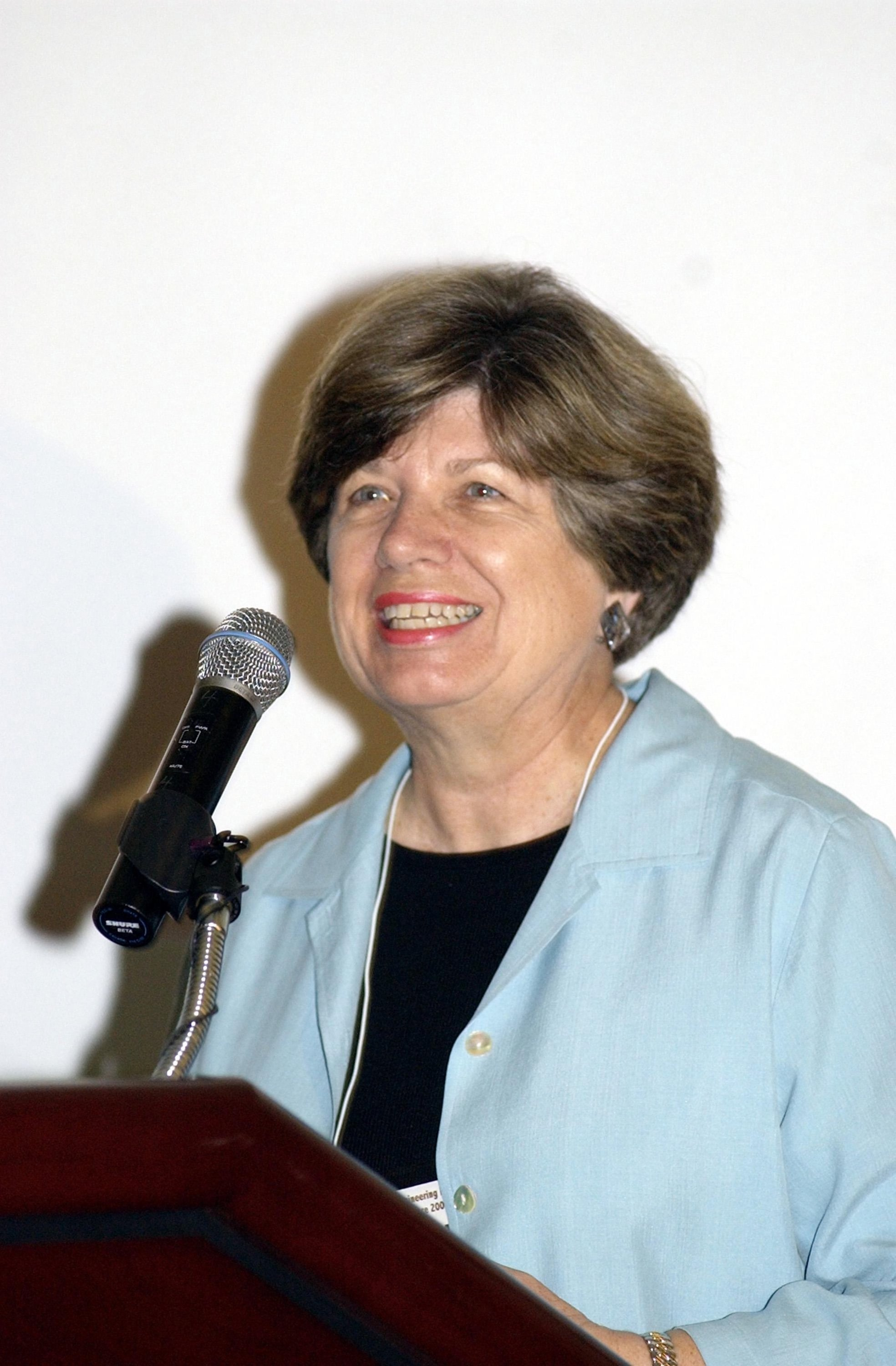
- Former Director of External Relations and Business Development at NASA Kennedy Space Center.
- Born: December 4, 1940 (age 85); Huntsville, Alabama
- Citizenship: United States
- Scientific career
- Fields: Aerospace engineer
- Workplaces: National Aeronautics and Space Administration (NASA)

JoAnn Hardin Morgan (born December 4, 1940) is an American aerospace engineer who was the first female engineer at the National Aeronautics and Space Administration (NASA) John F. Kennedy Space Center and the first woman to serve as a senior executive at Kennedy Space Center. For her work at NASA, Morgan was honored by U.S. President Bill Clinton as a Meritorious Executive in 1995 and 1998. Prior to her retirement in 2003, she held various leadership positions over 40 years in the human space flight programs at NASA. Morgan served as the director of the External Relations and Business Development during her final years at the space center.

== Early life and education ==
JoAnn Hardin, the eldest child of four children of Don and Laverne Hardin, was born in Huntsville, Alabama on December 4, 1940, near where her father was stationed as a U.S. Army pilot at Redstone Arsenal during World War Two. While she was in high school, her family relocated to Titusville, Florida where her father worked at Cape Canaveral as an ordnance administrator in the US Army's rocket program. There she met her future husband, Larry Morgan. Immediately after graduating from high school in June 1958, she joined the Army Ballistic Missile Agency at Cape Canaveral as a civilian engineering aide. In the Fall of 1958, Hardin enrolled at the University of Florida in Gainesville where she studied mathematics. During her summer breaks, she continued to work at Cape Canaveral under mentors such as German-American engineer Wernher von Braun. In her work as an engineering aide, Hardin had hands-on experience designing rocket launch computer systems for the initial NASA flight programs. After Hardin earned a Bachelor of Arts in mathematics at the Jacksonville State University in Alabama in 1963, she went to work for NASA at the Kennedy Space Center as an aerospace engineer.

== Kennedy Space Center ==
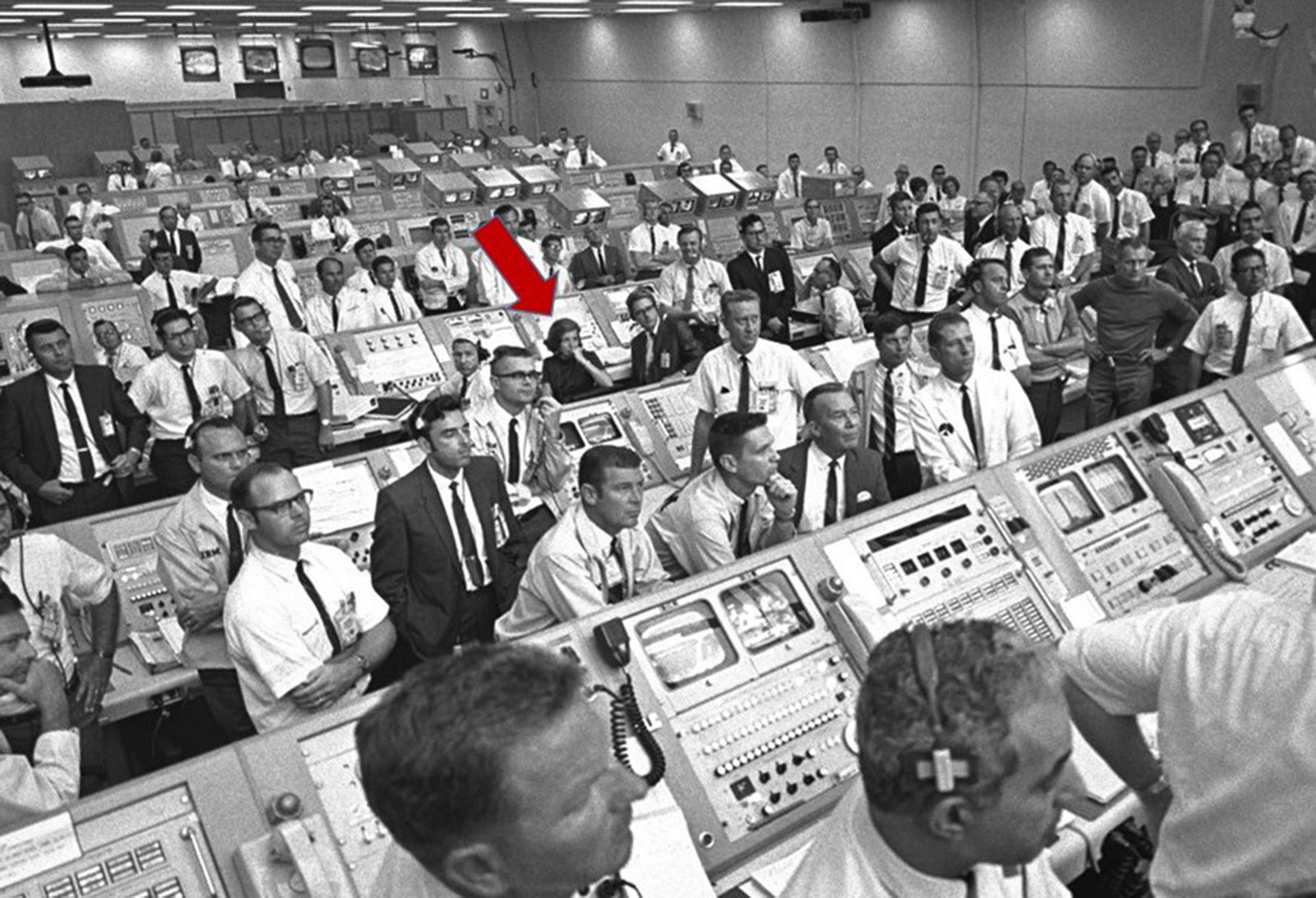
Joann Morgan was the only female engineer in the firing room at the launch of Apollo 11

In 1963, Morgan began full-time employment at Kennedy Space Center. She was the only female engineer, and she recalls that she "would remain the only woman there for a long time." Morgan was the only female engineer in the firing room during the launch of Apollo 11 on 16 July 1969.

Morgan humorously notes that "for the first 15 years, I worked in a building where there wasn't a ladies' rest room," and "it was a big day in my book when there was one."

=== Management career ===
Morgan was selected to receive a Sloan Fellowship to prepare her for a management position at the space center. She enrolled at Stanford University and earned a Masters of Science in 1977. Two years later she was promoted to the Chief of the Computer Services Division. Morgan served as the director of the External Relations and Business Development during her final years at the space center except for a brief stint in 2002 when she was appointed as acting deputy director of KSC for several months. Morgan retired in August 2003 with forty-five years of service to NASA.

== Later life and honors ==
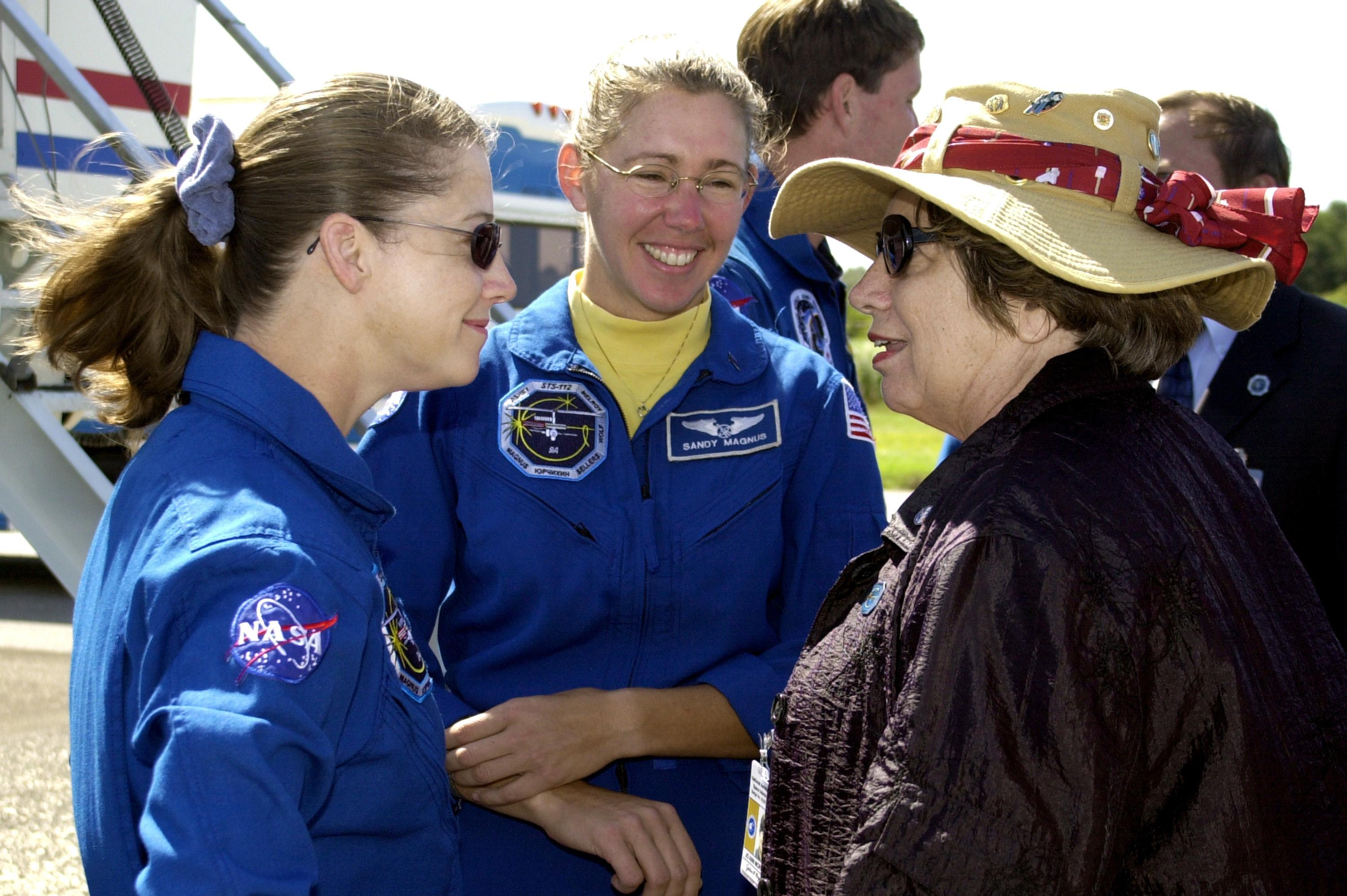
JoAnn H. Morgan (then Director of External Relations and Business Development at KSC) with STS-112 Pilot Pamela Melroy (left) and Mission Specialist Sandra Magnus (center) after the landing of Space Shuttle Atlantis

Morgan was honored by U.S. President Bill Clinton as a Meritorious Executive in 1995 and 1998. In 1995, she was inducted into the Florida Women's Hall of Fame. According to Orlando Business Journal, "during her career in the U.S. human space flight programs, Morgan has received many honors and awards, including an achievement award for her work during the activation of Apollo Launch Complex 39, four exceptional service medals, and two outstanding leadership medals." She received an Outstanding Leadership Medal in 1991 and 2001, the Society of Women Engineer's National "Upward Mobility Award," and the American Society of Mechanical Engineers' "J. Tal Webb Award" in 1994, the "Distinguished Service Award" by the Space Coast Chapter of Federally Employed Women in 1996, the "Achievement Award for Management Leadership" by the 34th Annual Space Congress in 1998, the "Debus Award" from the National Space Club in 1998, and the "1998 Presidential Distinguished Rank Award". Morgan is a member of AIAA, the National Space Club, and Tau Beta Pi. Morgan was appointed to be a Trustee of the Florida state universities for two terms, in 2001 and 2003.
