= Michael D. Leinbach =

American aerospace and civil engineer

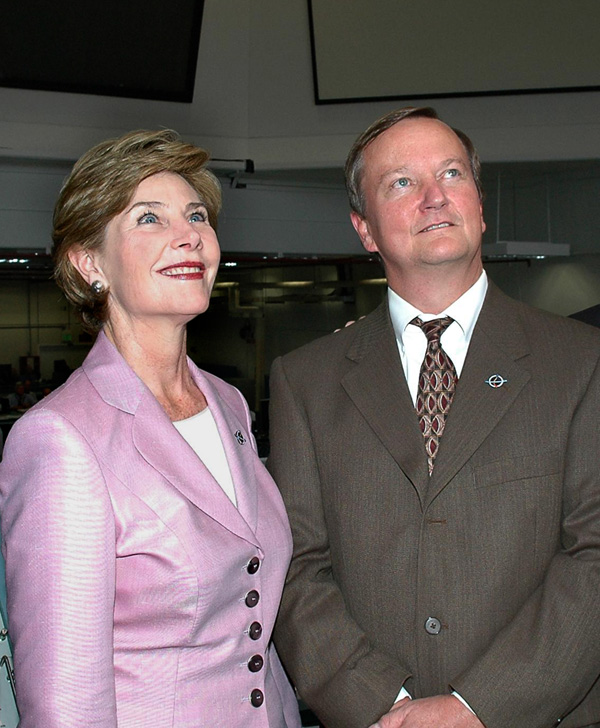
- Mike Leinbach and First Lady Laura Bush watch the successful launch of Discovery's "Return to Flight" mission STS-114.
- Born: Reading, Pennsylvania
- Education: B.S. Architecture, M.E. Civil Engineering
- Alma mater: University of Virginia
- Employer: NASA
- Title: Shuttle Launch Director
- Spouse: Charlotte Leinbach

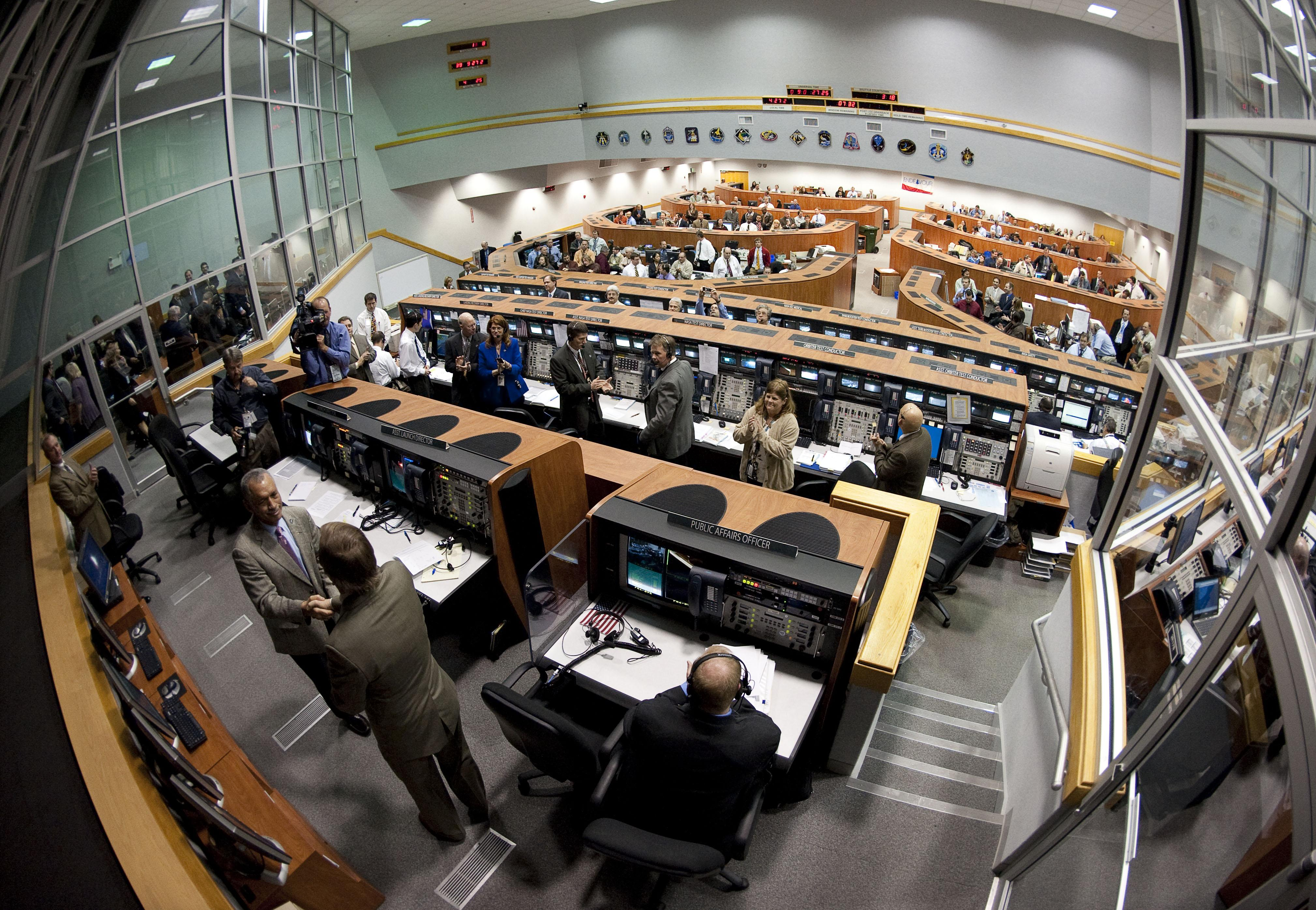
Bolden, left, congratulates Leinbach and the launch team in Firing Room Four of the Launch Control Centre for a successful launch of STS-130.

Michael D. Leinbach (born c. 1953) is an aerospace engineer who was the former Shuttle Launch Director at NASA's John F. Kennedy Space Center (KSC), Florida. He was responsible for activities in the overall shuttle launch countdown, including planning, policy, and execution.

== Early life ==
Leinbach was born in Reading, Pennsylvania, and graduated from Yorktown High School, Arlington, Virginia in 1971. He received a Bachelor of Science in Architecture in 1976, and a Master of Engineering in Civil Engineering (emphasis in structural dynamics) in 1981 from the University of Virginia.

== NASA career ==
In 1984, Leinbach joined NASA as a structural engineer. Initially, Leinbach was a lead design engineer for various launch pad systems, including weather protection and the Emergency Egress Slide Wire system. In 1988, Leinbach became a NASA Test Director (NTD), responsible for directing daily operations at Kennedy Space Center (KSC) Launch Complex. In 1991, he was named Shuttle Test Director, and conducted the terminal countdown and launch of seventeen shuttle missions, in addition to being responsible for all planning activities associated with pre-launch.

From 1998 to May 2000, Leinbach was the deputy director of Space Station Hardware Integration, responsible for all International Space Station (ISS) processing at KSC, and at contractor locations. During this time, he oversaw the development of a program to verify functionality and operability of the first phase of the ISS Program.

In May 2000, Leinbach was assigned to serve as Assistant Launch Director, and was promoted to Launch Director in August 2000.

In 2003, following Space Shuttle Columbia's breakup upon re-entry, Leinbach was the leader of the initial debris recovery team in Texas, and Louisiana. He was named to lead the Columbia Reconstruction Team, whose goal was to determine the cause of the accident based only on the debris collected and reassembled at KSC. Following the investigation, Leinbach suggested loaning the debris to various academic institutions for study, to help develop safer spacecraft for the future.

Leinbach led the NASA Shuttle Launch Team for all shuttle missions since 2005 except STS-122, polling all areas prior to launch, and giving the final "go" for launch. Leinbach was NASA's final shuttle launch Director, giving the final shuttle launch GO call to Atlantis (STS-135) in 2011. He retired from NASA four months later, ending his decades-long tenure at the agency on 30 November 2011. The following year, he began overseeing human space operations for United Launch Alliance (ULA), which builds and flies Atlas 5 and Delta 4 rockets. He remains dedicated to promoting long-term human space flight in commercial, political, and government arenas.

In 2015, Leinbach began work with author Jonathan Ward on a project called Bringing Columbia Home. The project includes the website, a blog by the same name written by both men, a Facebook community, and their book, which was ultimately published in January 2018.

== Awards ==
Leinbach has received a number of group achievement and performance awards, including NASA's Exceptional Service Medal in 1993, "For leadership in planning and conducting shuttle launch countdowns" and NASA's Medal for Outstanding Leadership in 2003 "For significant contributions to the Space Shuttle Program." In November 2004, Leinbach was awarded the Presidential Rank Award, an award given by the office of the President of the United States for "Exceptional long-term accomplishments."

Asteroid 47786 Michaelleinbach (2000EQ20), discovered by the Catalina Sky Survey, is named in his honor.
