= Frankfurt University of Applied Sciences =

State University of Applied Sciences in Frankfurt am Main

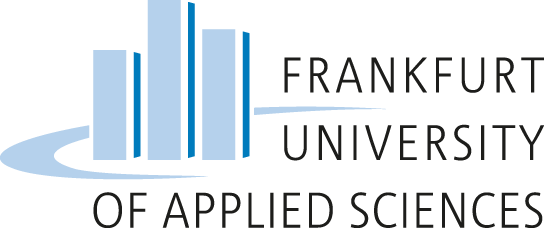
- Frankfurt University of Applied Sciences
- Other names: Frankfurt University
- Former names: Fachhochschule Frankfurt am Main
- Motto: "Wissen durch Praxis stärkt"
- Type: Public
- Established: 1 August 1971
- Academic affiliations: EUC / EPS; Florence Network
- President: Kai-Oliver Schocke
- Academic staff: 250 professors + 1,195 academic staff
- Students: 15626(Winter Semester 2019/20)
- Location: Frankfurt am Main, Hessen, Germany; 50°07′49″N 8°41′33″E
- Campus: Urban
- Colors: Blue and white
- Website: www.frankfurt-university.de
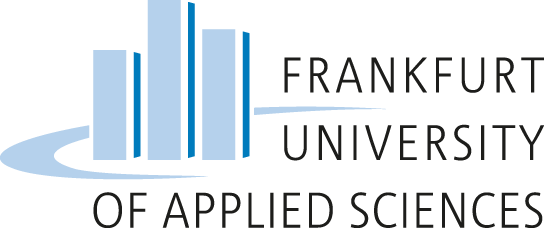
- Frankfurt University of Applied Sciences

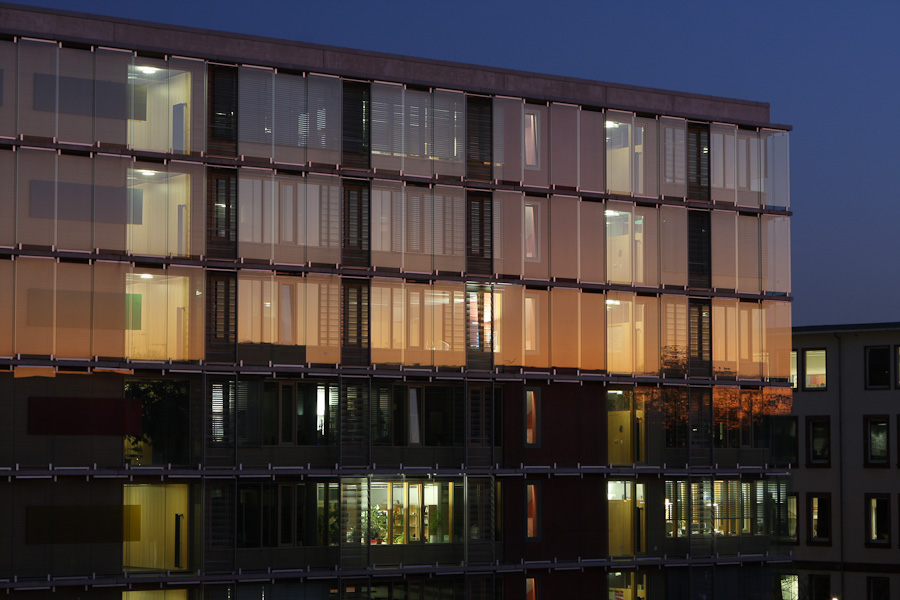
The new main building at dusk

The Frankfurt University of Applied Sciences (previously known as the Fachhochschule Frankfurt am Main) is a public University of Applied Sciences in Frankfurt am Main, Germany.

The Frankfurt University of Applied Sciences provides about 38 study programmes in architecture and civil engineering, business and business law, informatics and engineering, social work and health. It has an international student body, with about 12,000 students coming from more than 100 countries. About 250 professors and over 1000 other employees work at the Frankfurt University of Applied Sciences. It has four faculties: Architecture and civil engineering; Informatics and engineering; Business and law; and Social work and health.

Most courses are taught in German; however, Master courses in English are provided in High Integrity Systems, Information Technology, and Urban development.

A well-known alumnus of the university is Gerhard Schulmeyer. Frankfurt University of Applied Sciences is part of the IT-Cluster Rhine-Main-Neckar, the "Silicon Valley of Europe".

== History ==
The earliest predecessor of the Frankfurt University of Applied Sciences, the "Königliche Baugewerkschule" was founded in 1908, and the "Royal College of Mechanical Engineering" was founded in 1910. The Fachhochschule Frankfurt am Main was created on 1 August 1971 by integrating various predecessor institutions, including the Higher School of Social Work, the State Higher Economic School (HWS), and engineering schools. The Fachhochschule Frankfurt am Main was renamed to Frankfurt University of Applied Sciences on 1 July 2014.

By July 2001, the university consisted of thirteen departments. Four departments, Architecture, Civil Engineering, Geodesy, and Surveying, were part of the original Royal Baugewerkschule, founded in 1908 for civil engineering. Four more departments, Electrical Engineering, Precision Engineering, Mechanical Engineering, and Process Technology were part of the State united engineering schools, founded in 1920. The department of Social pedagogy was founded in 1954 as part of the urban Jugendleiterinnenseminar, and the Department of Social Work goes back to the State-recognized women's school for Volkspflege founded in 1944. The Department of Economics was founded in 1966 and originated with the state higher Wirtschaftsfachschule. The Data Processing and Social and Cultural Studies departments had been first created as part of the FH in 1971 and were originally service departments created for the students of engineering disciplines. The final department, Healthcare, was added in 1993.

From 1995 to 1998, these departments were spread over two locations. Social pedagogy, Social work, Nursing, and Business were situated at Nordweststadt; the others were operated from Nibelungenplatz, at Kleiststrasse in the old building of the "State School" and in the old "engineering school".

In July 2001 it was decided to combine the then thirteen departments into four subject areas.

In September 2005 The Presidents of the University of Applied Sciences of Frankfurt and the Wiesbaden University of Applied Sciences agreed to a strategic partnership of the two Universities of Applied Sciences of Frankfurt and Wiesbaden. This was due to the changes in the German higher education system (Bachelor / Master) and thereby increasing competition between colleges, universities, and vocational colleges. On 14 September 2007 a steering group was set up by the President by issuing a paper for the merger of the two Universities of Applied Sciences as Hochschule Rhein-Main – University of Applied Sciences. However, on 12 December 2007, the merger was rejected by the Senate of the University of Applied Sciences Frankfurt am Main, although it had already been approved by the Senate of the Wiesbaden University of Applied Sciences.

=== Presidents ===
1. 1971–1982 Johannes Uthoff
2. 1983–1986 Rolf Kessler
3. 1987–1994 Johannes Schneider
4. 1995–2002 Rolf Kessler
5. 2003–2008 Wolf Rieck
6. 2008–2014 Detlev Buchholz
7. 2014–2023 Frank Dievernich
8. 2023–present Kai-Oliver Schocke

== International orientation ==
The Frankfurt University of Applied Sciences is located in an urban area and its 10,000 students are drawn from about 100 nations. Students can attain double degrees with partner universities, and the university provides comprehensive exchange services for both students and teachers.

== Structural development ==
=== Campus building 1 ===
"Campus building 1" was completed with a total cost of approximately 53 million euros. It allowed structural improvements such as the creation of a computer science center, computer rooms and rooms for research projects, and spare rooms for use of buildings 2, 3, and 4. This includes 12,000 m^{2} (130,000 sq ft) of floor space, in a new building (building 1), and an expansion of the existing building 2. Larger areas rented again in the BCN – due to the growth of the university.

=== Campus building 2 ===
With the project "campus building 2" further spatial overload of the university was solved. For this, Kleiststraße was turned over to be converted to use for public transport and integrated into the campus. Appropriate resolutions were adopted by the competent bodies of the City of Frankfurt am Main in 2002.

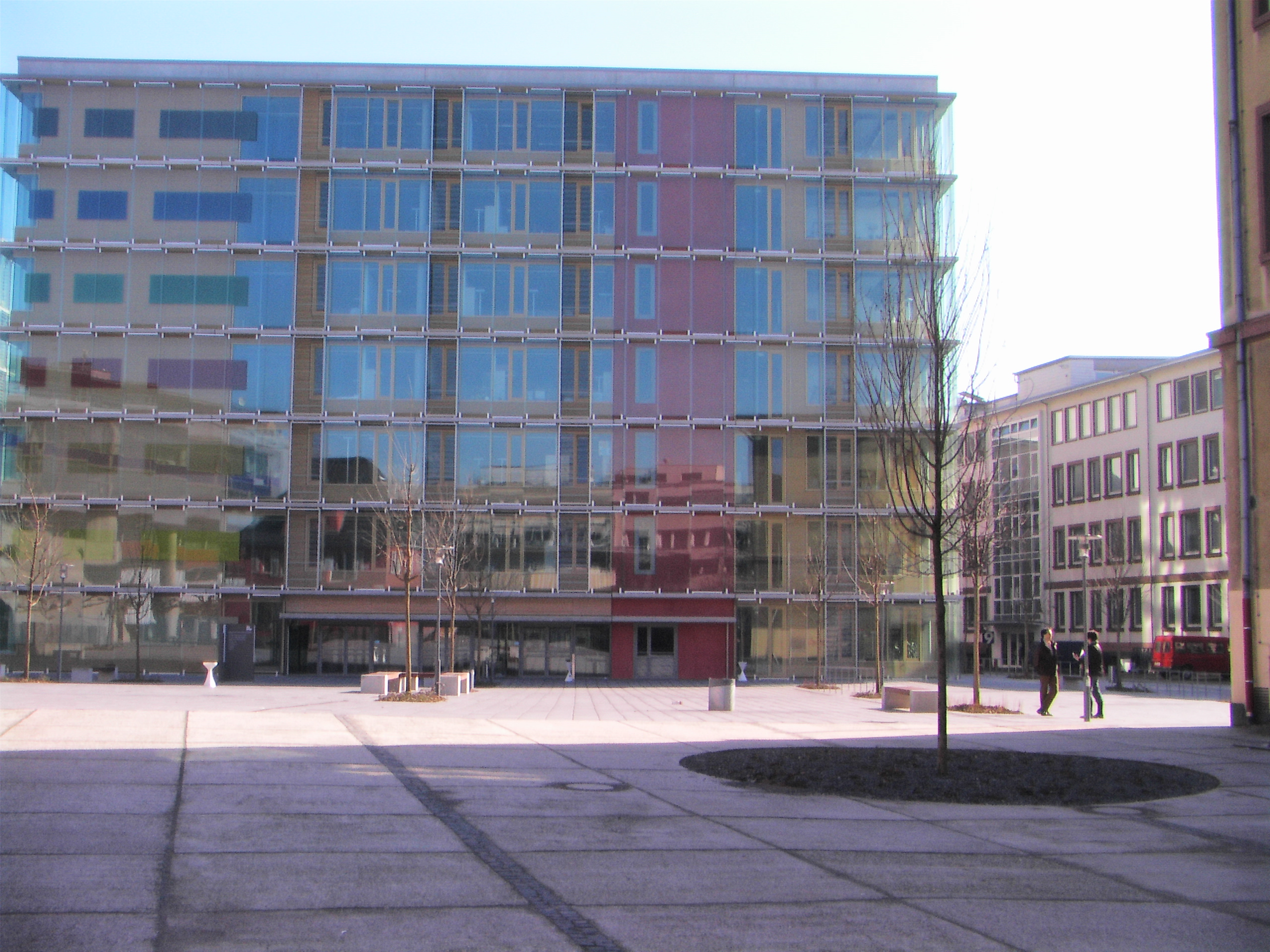
Building-1

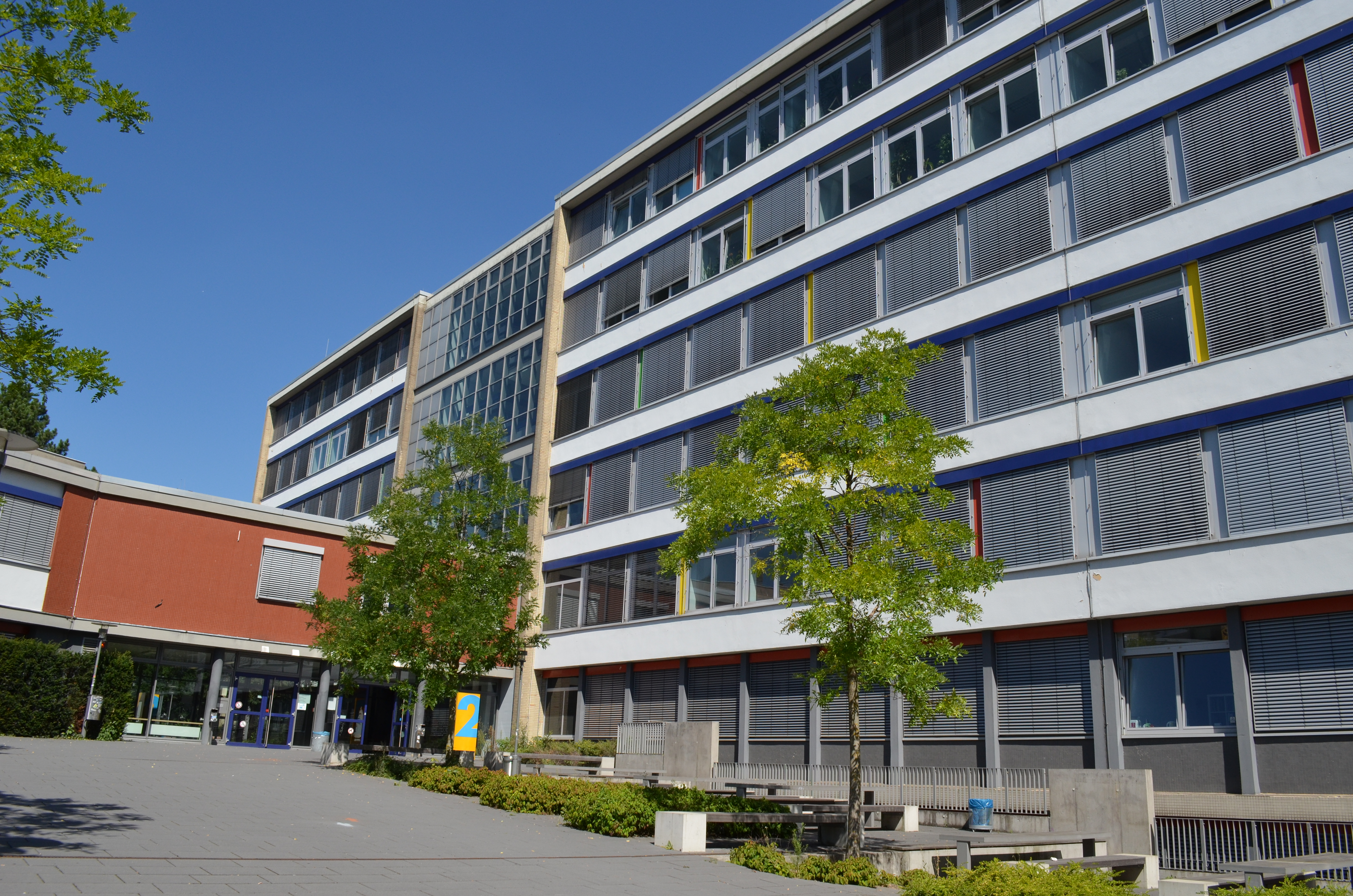
Building-2

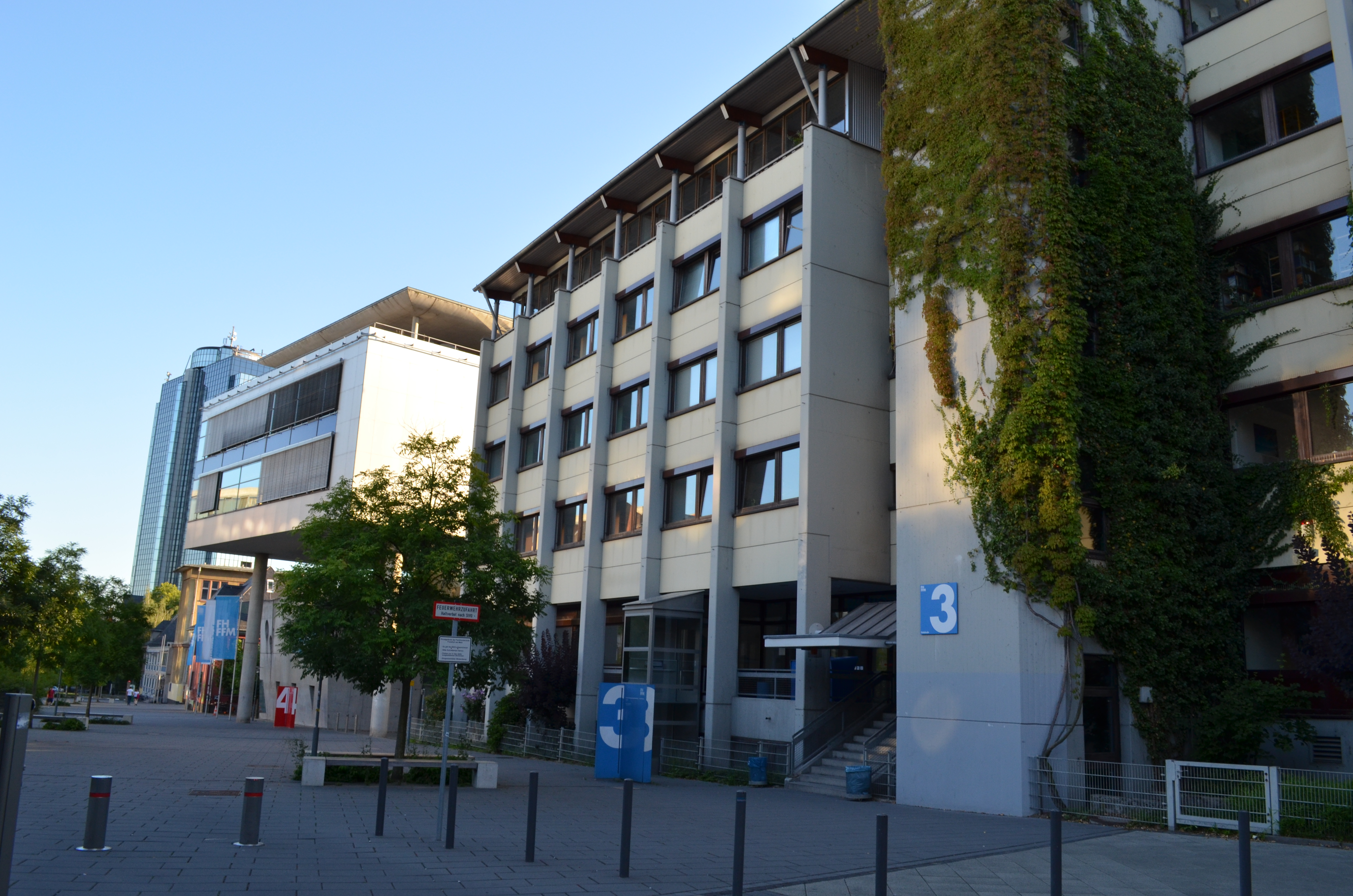
Building 3

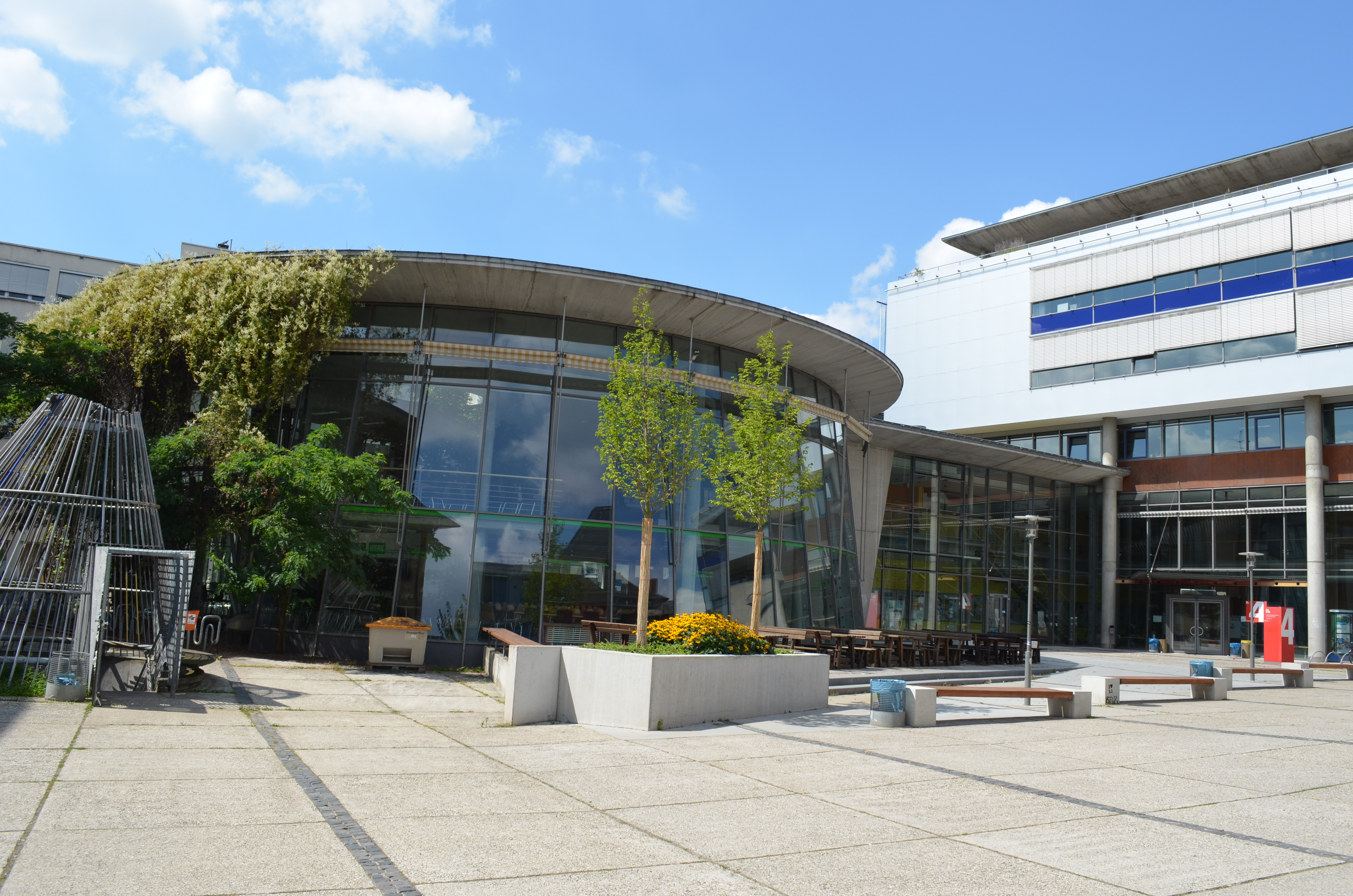
Building 4

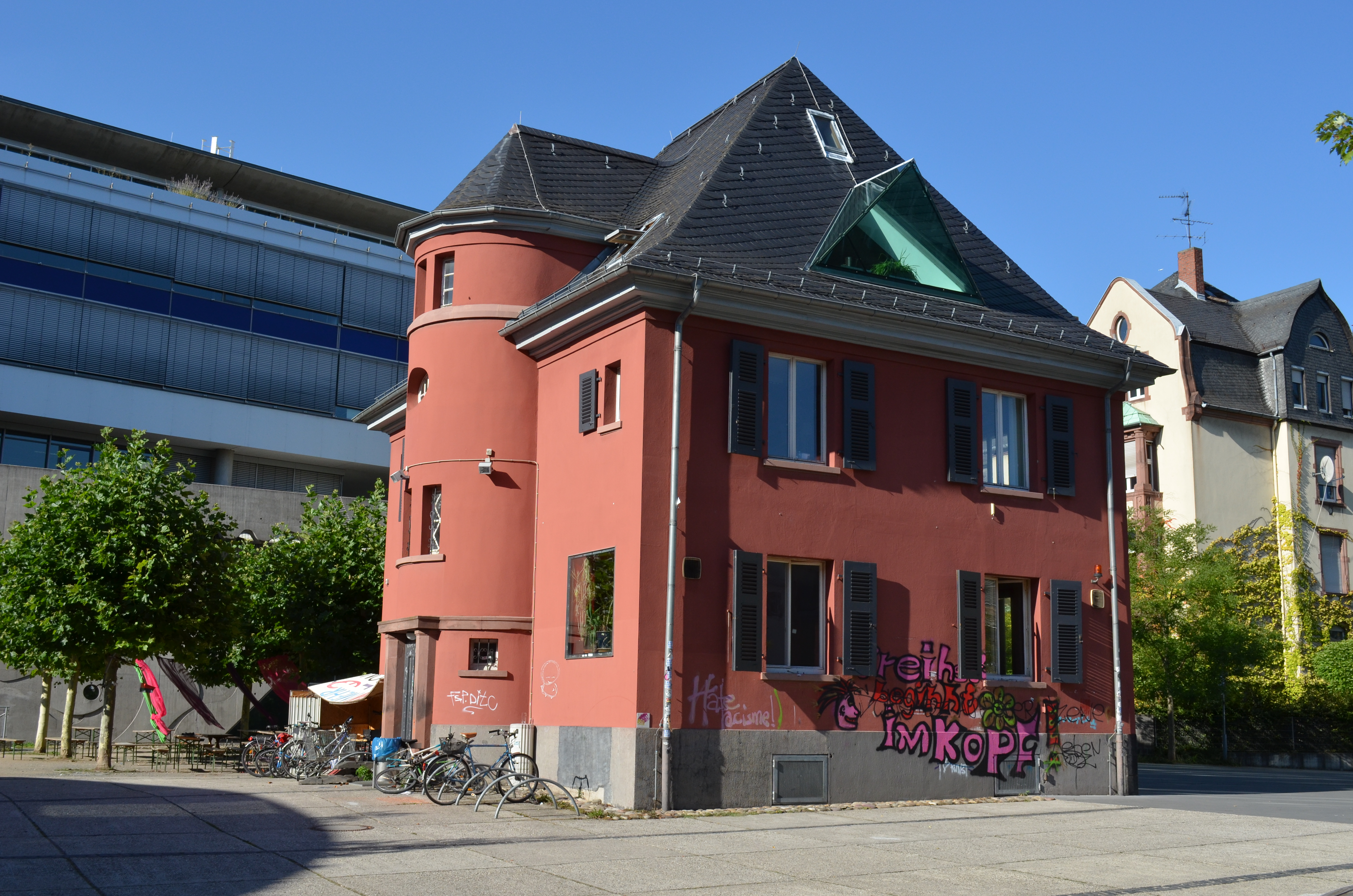
Building 5

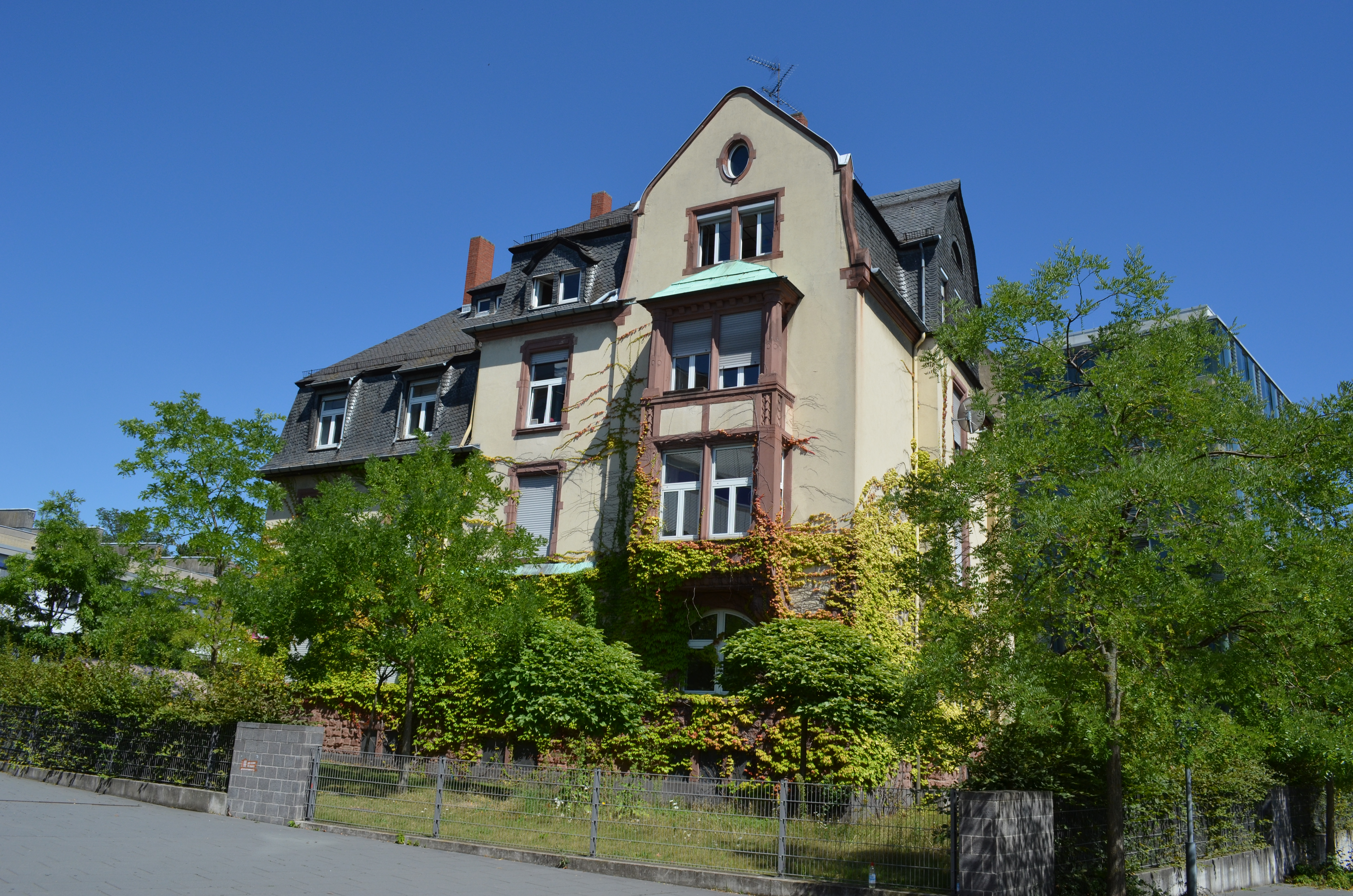
Building 6

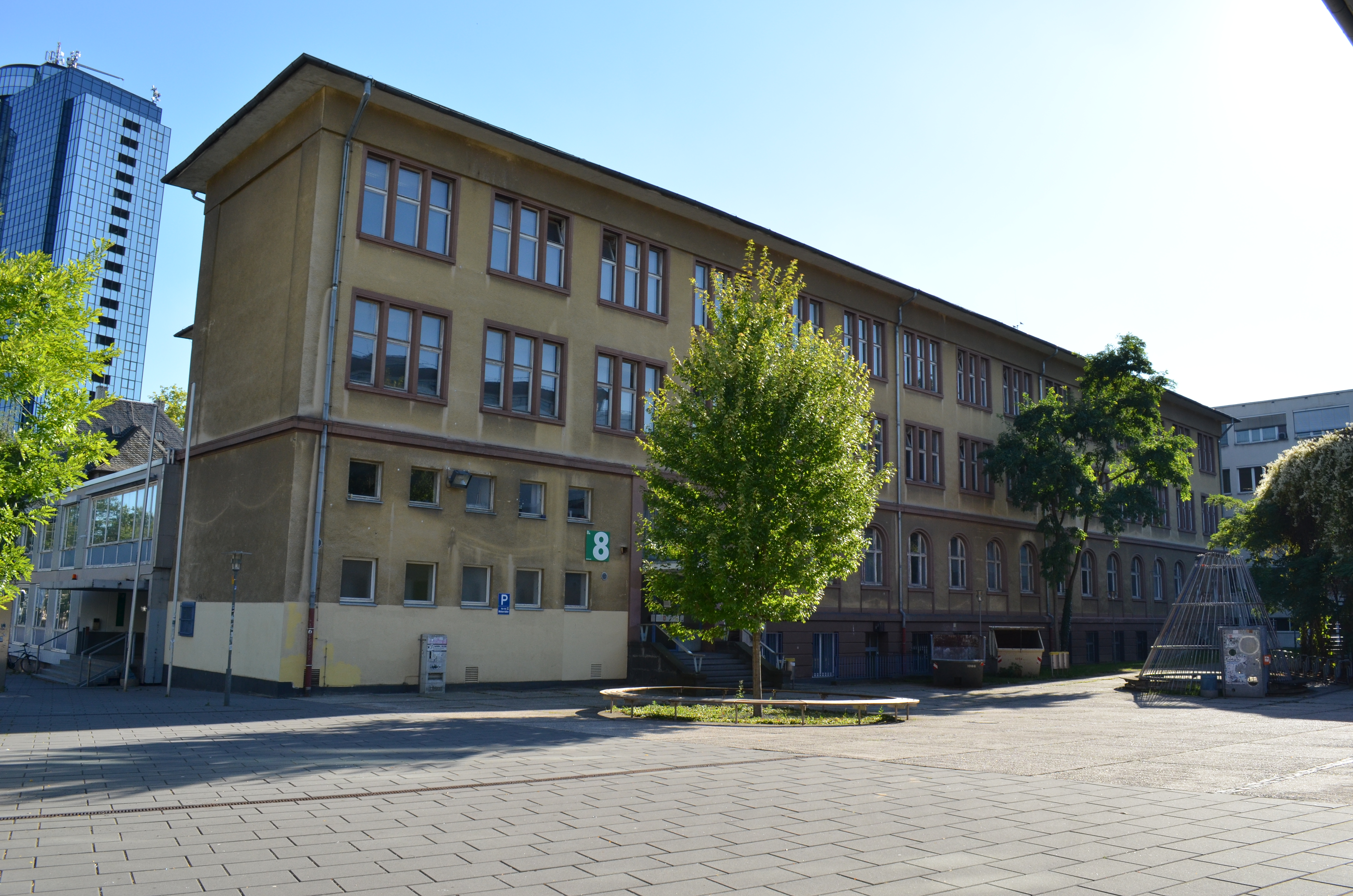
Building 8

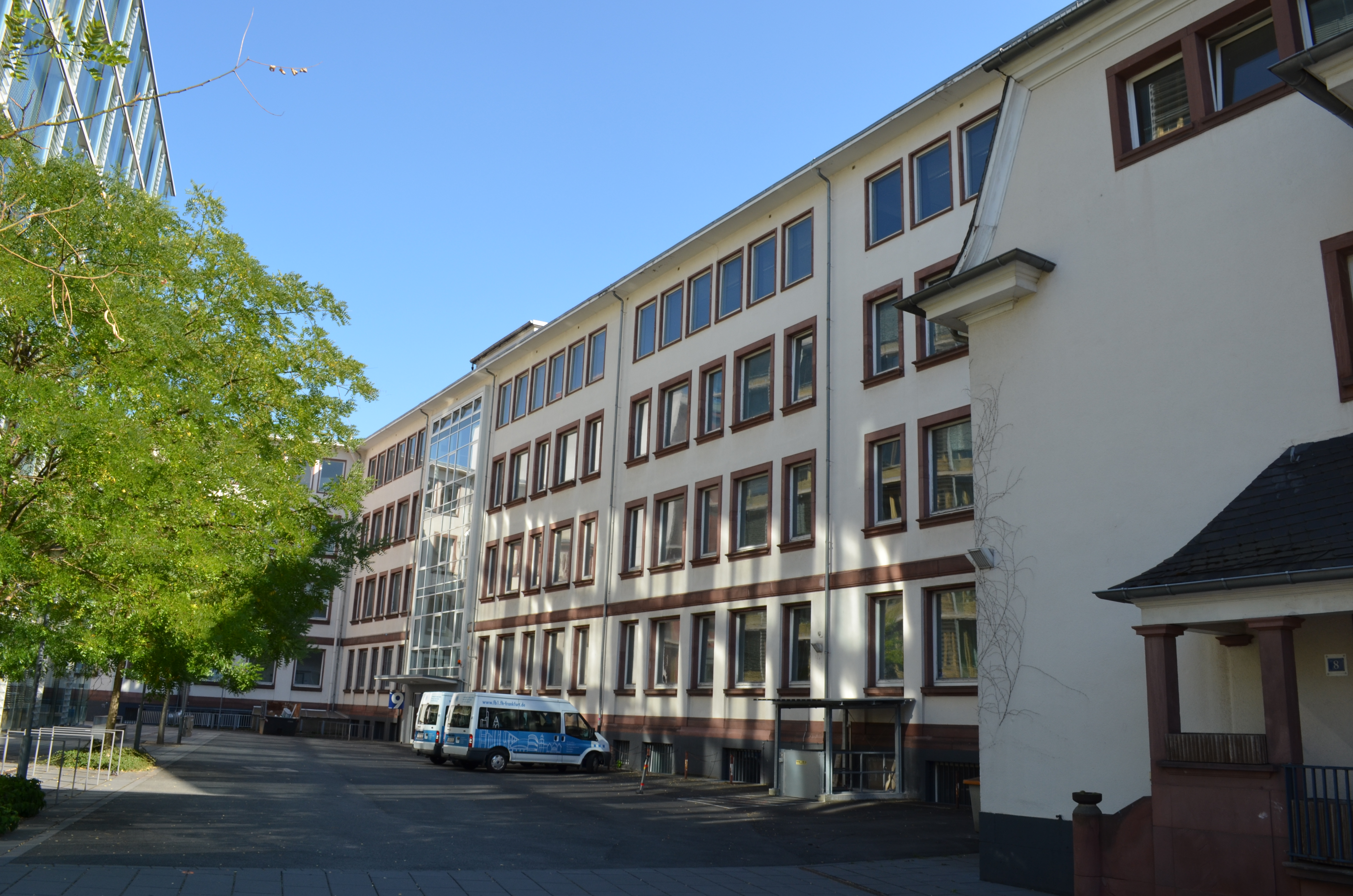
Building 9

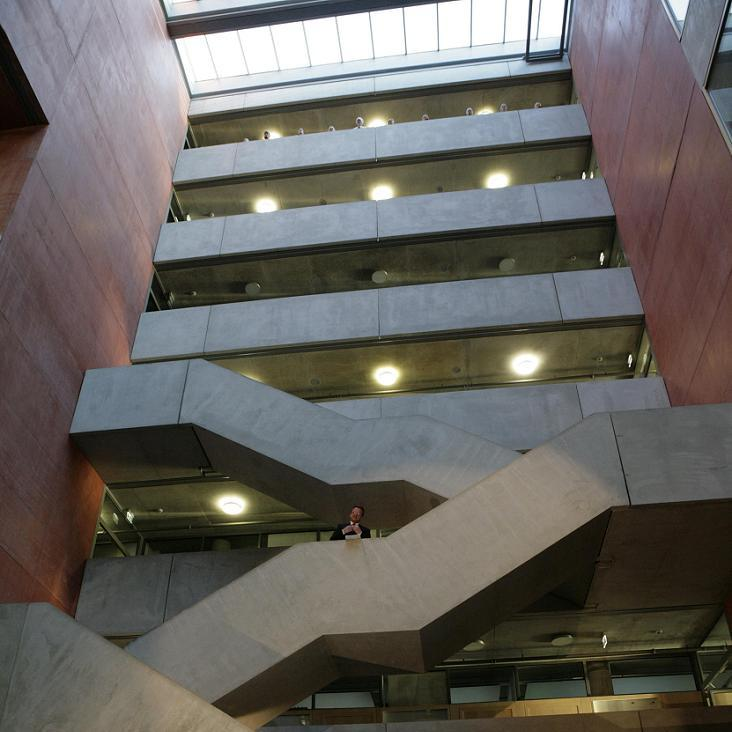
Inside Building-1

== Divisions ==
The departments of the Frankfurt University of Applied Sciences include:

1. Architecture – Civil Engineering – Geomatics
2. Computer science and engineering
3. Economic and law
4. Social Work and Health

== Facilities and affiliated institutions ==
=== Student organizations ===
- Fachsprachenzentrum
- Selbstlernzentrum
- Café Profitratte
- Café Kurzschlusz
- Café-1
- Kostbar
- Board of European Students of Technology Frankfurt

=== Scientific and research institutions ===
- Institut für Materialwissenschaften (IfM)
- Institut für Stadt- und Regionalentwicklung (ISR)
- Institut für Suchtforschung (ISFF)
- Institut für interdisziplinäre Technik (IiT)
- Frankfurter Technologiezentrum Medien (FTzM)
- Institut für Migrationsstudien und interkulturelle Kommunikation (IMiK)
- Institut für professionelle Anwendungen in der Informatik (IPIAG)
- Hessisches Zentrum für Qualitätssicherung und Qualitätsmanagement (HZQ)
- Institut für Entrepreneurship (IFE)
- Zentrum für Gesundheitswirtschaft und -recht (ZGWR)
- Zentrum für Logistik, Mobilität und Nachhaltigkeit (ZLMN)

=== University Interscholastic research centers ===
- Hessisches Institut für Pflegeforschung (HeSSIP)
- Gender- und Frauenforschungszentrum der Hessischen Hochschulen (gFFZ)
- Center for Biomedical Engineering (CBME)
