= List of abbreviations in photography =

During most of the 20th century photography depended mainly upon the photochemical technology of silver halide emulsions on glass plates or roll film. Early in the 21st century this technology was displaced by the electronic technology of digital cameras. The development of digital image sensors, microprocessors, memory cards, miniaturised devices and image editing software enabled these cameras to offer their users a much wider range of operating options than was possible with the older silver halide technology. This has led to a proliferation of new abbreviations, acronyms and initialisms. The commonest of these are listed below. Some are used in related fields of optics and electronics but many are specific to digital photography.

== Acronyms and initialisms that are not brand-specific ==
Photography abbreviations not specific to brands
Abbr	Description
A; Av	Aperture priority or Aperture value. Automatic exposure mode where the photographer sets the lens f-stop and the AE firmware sets the shutter speed.
AA	Anti-aliasing filter. A built-in filter over the image sensor used before a signal sampler to restrict the bandwidth of a signal.
AE	Automatic exposure. Hardware and software ("firmware"), built into the camera, measures luminance of the subject and automatically sets shutter speed, lens aperture or sensitivity; this also allows the camera to set the aperture for manual lenses fixed with an AE chip.
AE-L; AEL	Automatic exposure lock. Technology for holding an exposure setting from one scene to another.
AF	Autofocus. The lens is focused automatically by means of the camera's hardware and firmware, to obtain optimum sharpness of an image.
AF-L; AFL	Autofocus lock. Locks a particular focus setting, preventing refocusing if the scene changes.
AoV	Angle of view. Describes the angular extent of a given scene that is imaged by a camera.
APEX	Additive system of photographic exposure. A system to aid calculation of correct exposures, developed in the 1960s. Some aspects are included in Exif.
APS-C	Advanced Photo System type-C, a film format defined as 25.1 × 16.7 mm. Different manufacturers use this term for image sensors measuring between about 20.7 × 13.8 mm to 28.7 × 19.1 mm. This format has an approximate ratio of 3∶2.
ASA	The American Standards Association (now called the American National Standards Institute, ANSI) defined the ASA system for rating the speed sensitivity of photographic emulsions; now superseded by the ISO system.
AWB	Automatic white balance. A setting that uses the camera's hardware and firmware to estimate the colour temperature of the scene.
B	Bulb setting. A setting on camera shutters. It is a momentary-action mode that holds shutters open for as long as the photographer depresses the shutter-release button.
B&W; B/W	Black and white. Images combine black and white to produce a range of achromatic brightnesses of grey
C1	Capture One, a software application for processing images from digital cameras. Developed by Phase One.
CA	Chromatic aberration. Failure of a lens to focus all colours at the same point. The aberrations can be along the optical axis (Longitudinal CA, or LoCA) or off-axis (Lateral or Transverse CA, TCA).
CCD	Charge-coupled device. A semiconductor technology, used to create photosensor arrays for some digital cameras.
CDAF	Contrast-detection autofocus. One of the mechanisms of automatic lens focusing.
CL	Camera left. Similar CR is camera right, slang
CIF	Catch in focus. A technique for allowing a camera to be pre-focussed to a defined spot, and the exposure is only made when a subject is in focus at that spot. Also called trap focus.
CMOS	Complementary metal oxide semiconductor. A semiconductor technology, used to create photosensor arrays for some digital cameras.
CMYK	CMYK color model. A subtractive process for color printing that utilises cyan, magenta, yellow and black inks to create most printable colors. (Some colors can not be accurately reproduced using this system and require the use of "spot color" to be used. See also: Pantone Matching System.) Some other printable colors can be reproduced using Hexachrome color model which adds orange and green to the base CMYK color model. (CMYKOG) It is possible to omit black ink, in which case the process is termed CMY.
CP; CPL; CPoL	Circular polarizing filter.
CSC	Compact system camera. Mirrorless interchangeable-lens camera, smaller than a digital single-lens reflex camera.
DCF	Design rule for Camera File system. A digital camera file system standard; JEITA number CP-3461.
DIN	Deutsches Institut für Normung. A logarithmic system for expressing film speed in common use in Europe since 1934. Now combined with the ASA linear system, in the form of the ISO system.
DOF; DoF	Depth of field. A measure of the permissible distance within which an object remains in acceptable, though not perfect, focus. Calculations of DOF assume that an imperfectly focused "circle of confusion" smaller than 0.20 to 0.25 mm is indistinguishable from perfect focus in an image viewed from a normal distance. This is approximately equivalent to 0.03 mm in the case of an image on 35 mm film or FF format.
DPI	Dots per inch. A measure of the ability of a printer or scanner to handle fine detail.
DR	Dynamic range. Expresses the luminance range of a scene, a captured image or the maximum range of luminance that a camera can successfully capture at one setting. It is often used imprecisely, but can sometimes be quantified as a ratio. The term contrast ratio may be preferred for the luminance range in a scene.
DSC	Digital Still Camera. Prefix on image filenames produced by various digital cameras.
DSLR	Digital single-lens reflex camera; also dSLR.
ED	Extra low dispersion glass. Used in composite lenses to reduce chromatic aberration. One of a class of special glasses, including anomalous dispersion (AD), special low dispersion (SLD) and extraordinary low dispersion (ELD) glass, used in place of fluorite.
EFC; EFCS; EFSC	Electronic first curtain, electronic front curtain, electronic first curtain shutter, electronic first shutter curtain of a focal plane shutter.
EV	Exposure value. A system for indicating correct exposure in which the shutter speed and f-number are related arithmetically.
EVF	Electronic viewfinder. The through-the-lens view is displayed on a miniature solid-state screen, rather than on an optical screen or view.
EVIL	Electronic viewfinder interchangeable lens camera. See also MILC (mirrorless interchangeable-lens camera).
Exif	Exchangeable image file format. A standard format for tag data in digital camera files. Note: the Exif Specification states that 'Exif' is spelled title-cased, not with all-caps.
f; f/	f-number, f-stop. The numerical value of a lens aperture. The ratio of the focal length of the lens divided by its effective aperture diameter. 'f' or 'f' represents 'focal length' in lens formulas and calculations.
FF	Full frame, where the image sensor is approximately the same size as a 35 mm film: 36 × 24 mm.
FP	Focal plane. A shutter that opens and closes near to the film or image sensor, usually as a fast-moving slit, as contrasted with a bladed/leaf shutter located near a nodal point of a lens.
FPA	Focal plane array. A matrix of sensors positioned in the focal plane of a lens or other focusing device.
FPS	Frames per second. Used in reference to maximum continuous shooting rate or video.
GAS	Gear acquisition syndrome. Describing the tendency among enthusiasts, prosumers, and professionals to accumulate photographic gear. See also LBA ('lens-buying addiction').
GIF	Graphics Interchange Format. A computer file format for coloured images, restricted to 256 colours and useful for small file-size.
GN	Guide number. A value indicating the power of an electronic flash apparatus, and used to estimate exposure. GN = distance × f-number. One needs to specify the film or sensor ISO speed, and it is conventional to quote for ISO 100/21°. The distance can be in feet or in metres, the units to be specified.
GND; Grad ND	Graduated neutral density. A type of neutral density filter in which brightness is reduced more on one side of the filter than on the other, allowing the photographer to reduce the contrast between, for example, bright sky and dark land.
HDR	High dynamic range. Techniques that allow a digital image to show a wider contrast range than current image sensors can record in one file. Some cameras have firmware to do the processing.
IBIS	In-body image stabilization. A stabilization mechanism built into a camera body rather than into a lens
ICM	Intentional camera movement. The camera or the focus or zoom of its lens is adjusted by the photographer during an exposure in order to achieve special or artistic effects.
IPS	In-Person Sales The practice of meeting with your clients in-person to show and sell your photographs, rather than simply providing them with access to an online gallery.
IQ	Image quality. An informal abbreviation used in discussion forums. Usually subjective, though some studies have analysed mathematically quantifiable components of image quality.
IR	Infrared. The electromagnetic radiation with wavelengths longer than about 700 nm and not visible to the human eye.
IS	Image stabilization. Technology to minimize image blurring by camera movement during exposure. See also AS, OS, OIS, OSS, SR, SS, SSI, SSS, VR as brand-specific terms.
ISO	A system for quantifying the sensitivity ("speed") of a photographic emulsion, or a solid-state digital-camera's image sensor, to visible light. Normally followed by a numerical value, e.g.: ISO 100 or ISO 64/19°. Developed from the ASA and the DIN systems by the International Organization for Standardization.
JPEG	A format designed by the Joint Photographic Experts Group, that allows files of coloured images to be compressed to a smaller digital file than if the full range of colours were to be saved. Also .JPG as a computer file extension.
LBA	Lens buying addiction. Usually used in a jocular sense on camera forums, about a wish to add to an already extensive collection of interchangeable lenses.
LCA	An ambiguous abbreviation that should be avoided. Some writers use it to mean lateral (transverse) chromatic aberration, TCA, while others use it to mean longitudinal (axial) chromatic aberration, LoCA.
LCD	Liquid crystal display. A technology often used in the monitor screens of digital cameras, etc.
LED	Light-emitting diode. Semiconductor technology to convert electrical energy into light efficiently. Quasi-white and a range of colours, as well as infrared are possible.
LoCA	Longitudinal (axial) chromatic aberration.
LR	Lightroom, a software application for processing images from digital cameras. Developed by Adobe.
MC	Multi-coating or multi-coated. Anti-reflection coating of lenses to reduce transmission losses.
MC	May also stand for meter coupling or meter-coupled lenses. Whilst being a generic term, this meaning is mostly used to describe a generation of Minolta SR-mount lenses implementing this feature.
MFD	Minimum Focusing Distance. Minimum distance from which a lens can shoot a subject.
MF	Manual focus. The photographer adjusts the lens to obtain the image sharpness required, as opposed to AF.
MF	Medium Format. A size of film or image sensor somewhat larger than the 35mm film standard of 36 × 24 mm.
MILC	Mirrorless interchangeable-lens camera. Similar to a digital single-lens reflex camera, but having an electronic or rangefinder type of viewfinder in place of the mirror and pentaprism, to allow a more compact design.
MP	Megapixel. A million pixels; the term is used not only for the number of pixels in an image but also to express the number of image sensor elements of digital cameras or the number of display elements of digital displays
MTF	Modulation transfer function. A technical measure of the ability of a lens to create a finely detailed image. Several types of specialized apparatus are available to get the basic data on a lens and to analyse it. The calculated performance may be presented in various ways.
ND	Neutral density. A neutral-grey pre-lens filter to reduce overall brightness without altering colour balance.
NR	Noise reduction. Digital noise reduction through firmware processing or editing the digitized image.
OCF	Off-camera flash.
OOF; OoF	Out of focus, Out of Frame.
OVF	Optical viewfinder. The picture is framed on the focusing screen of a through-the-lens optical viewfinder, as found on [D]SLR cameras, or in a look-through-viewfinder, as found on rangefinder cameras.
PASM	Program, aperture priority, shutter priority, and manual modes on the mode dial in many cameras
PC	Prontor-Compur. A 3.5 mm coaxial camera jack named PC terminal, to synchronize external non-dedicated flashes (f.e. studio flashes), found on many more advanced camera models.
PC	Perspective Control, describing a lens that has the ability to shift laterally to control linear perspective in an image, or to tilt in order to adjust the plane/region of focus out of parallel with the camera's image plane.
PC	Personal computer, in conjunction with digital photography.
PDAF	Phase-detection autofocus. One of the mechanisms of automatic lens focusing.
PF	Purple fringing. A form of chromatic aberration in which a purple-violet haze degrades high contrast edges or over-saturated highlights. Some models of lens are widely criticised for this fault, though there are suggestions that it might also be due to properties of digital sensors.
PNG	Portable Network Graphics. A computer file format for compressed coloured images useful for small file-size.
P&S	Point-and-shoot camera. Slang for a small or compact camera that is easy to use because the essential functions are automated. Popular, but with limitations compared with more advanced cameras such as DSLR cameras with larger image sensors.
PPI	Pixels per inch. Pixel density, the number of pixels or picture elements contained in one linear inch in a digitally stored image.
PS; PSE	Photoshop, Photoshop Elements. Commercial computer applications developed by Adobe for editing digital images.
RF	Rangefinder camera, Camera using a range-finding focusing mechanism
RGB	RGB color space. An additive colour space that uses the primary colours of red, green and blue to create any colour. There are several variants: sRGB, ISO RGB and some proprietary standards. Used mainly in colour displays: computer monitors, digital cameras, etc.
RP	Resolving power. Usual meaning is the reciprocal of the distance between two just-distinguishable subject details.
S; Tv	Shutter priority or time value. Automatic exposure mode where the photographer sets a shutter speed, and the AE firmware automatically sets the appropriate lens aperture.
SC	Soft Capture. Capture of light emitting objects as the primary subject with light quality that is not primary but equally soft or washed as the background.
SLR	Single-lens reflex camera. A camera where the same lens is used to view the scene and to focus its image onto a film emulsion or solid-state photosensor. Usually combined with the facility to fit one of a range of lenses, and often more versatile than viewfinder/rangefinder cameras.
SOOC	Straight out of camera. Images as shot out of camera; implied is no post processing, slang
STU	Shoot through umbrella. White translucent photographic umbrella; a flash is shot inside the umbrella and the light is diffused onto the intended target; provides a soft, large light source.
Sv	Sensitivity value. Sensitivity priority automatic exposure mode, where the photographer sets the ISO sensitivity and the AE firmware sets the aperture or shutter speed.
TC	Teleconverter. A lens accessory that fits between the lens and camera body and extends the focal length of the lens, often by 1.4x or 2x, at the cost of reduced light, decreased image quality, and slower autofocus.
TCA	Transverse (lateral) chromatic aberration or lateral colour. Colour fringes that worsen the further the image point is from the optical axis.
TIFF	Tag Image File Format. A high fidelity computer file format for handling digital images that does not sacrifice colour and form detail in the way that 'lossy' compression formats such as GIF, JPEG and PNG do.
TLR	Twin-lens reflex. A camera with two lenses, one for taking pictures and one for viewing the scene. The two lenses are typically linked to ensure that they remain focused at the same distance.
TTL	Through the lens. Through the lens metering measures the luminance after it has passed through the camera lens, thus providing readings or settings that allow for aperture and focus changes, filters, etc.
UV	Ultraviolet. The electromagnetic radiation with wavelengths shorter than about 400 nm and not visible to the human eye.
WB	White balance.

== Initialisms that are used mainly by specific brands ==
Abbreviations use mainly by specific camera brands
Abbr	Brand	Description
A	Nikon	Automatic flash. The flash unit automatically meters the scene
AA	Nikon	Automatic aperture flash. The flash unit automatically meters the scene, but takes into account the camera's aperture and ISO values
ADI	Konica Minolta	Advanced distance integration. A technology to take distance information into account in combination with TTL flash metering
ADI	Minolta	Advanced distance integration. A technology to take distance information into account in combination with TTL flash metering
ADI	Sony	Advanced distance integration. A technology to take distance information into account in combination with TTL flash metering
AS	Konica Minolta	AntiShake. See IS in general usage.
AS	Minolta	AntiShake. See IS in general usage.
BL	Nikon	Balanced fill flash.
BBAR	Tamron	Broad-band anti-reflection. Anti-reflection multi-coating of lenses to reduce transmission losses.
DC	Nikon	Defocus control. Lens with bokeh (defocus) control.
DC	Konica Minolta	Digitally corrected. A lens designation to indicate lenses which feature improved lens-coating but cover the APS-C image circle only.
DC	Sigma	Digitally corrected. A lens designation to indicate lenses which feature improved lens-coating but cover the APS-C image circle only.
DC	Sony	Digitally corrected. A lens designation to indicate lenses which feature improved lens-coating but cover the APS-C image circle only.
DNG	—N/a	Digital Negative, an open raw image format promoted by Adobe and used by some camera manufacturers (f.e. Leica, Samsung, Ricoh and Pentax) and also camera-phone manufacturers (among them Nokia and Microsoft). Developed from the TIFF/EP digital image file format.
DX	Nikon	DX. A designation for APS-C sized image sensors.
EMD	Canon	Electromagnetic diaphragm. A more accurate and faster method of actuating a lens diaphragm.
EOS	Canon	Electro-Optical System. See Canon EOS.
FX	Nikon	FX. A designation for full-frame sized image sensors. See FF for general usage.
G	Minolta	Gold. A lens designation suffix applied to top grade Minolta AF and Sony Alpha lenses.
G	Sony	Gold. A lens designation suffix applied to top grade Minolta AF and Sony Alpha lenses.
HSM	Sigma	Hypersonic motor. A lens autofocus motor.
IS	Canon	Image stabilizer. See general usage.
L	Canon	Luxury. A lens designation suffix applied to top grade Canon lenses, usually incorporating aspheric and low dispersion elements.
OIS	Panasonic	Optical image stabilization. See IS in general usage.
OS	Sigma	Optical stabilizer. See IS in general usage.
OSS	Sony	Optical SteadyShot. See IS in general usage.
PZD	Tamron	Piezo drive. Autofocus mechanism that employs a piezo-electric motor.
RPT	Nikon	Repeat flash
SAM	Sony	Smooth autofocus motor. Autofocus mechanism that employs a piezo-electric motor or micro-motor.
SDM	Pentax	Silent drive motor. An autofocus mechanism.
SLT	Sony	Single-lens translucent. A variation of DSLR, but with fixed semi-transparent mirror.
SMC	Pentax	Super multi coated. Anti-reflection coating of lenses to reduce transmission losses.
SR	Pentax	Shake reduction. See IS in general usage.
SS	Sony	SteadyShot. See IS in general usage.
SSI	Sony	SteadyShot INSIDE. See IS in general usage.
SSS	Sony	Super SteadyShot. See IS in general usage.
SSM	Konica Minolta	Supersonic-wave motor. An autofocus mechanism in lenses
SSM	Minolta	Supersonic-wave motor. An autofocus mechanism in lenses
SSM	Sony	Supersonic-wave motor. An autofocus mechanism in lenses
STF	Minolta	Smooth trans focus. A special purpose lens for pleasant Bokeh utilizing an apodization filter, or an autobracketing function to achieve the same effect
STF	Sony	Smooth trans focus. A special purpose lens for pleasant Bokeh utilizing an apodization filter, or an autobracketing function to achieve the same effect
SWM	Nikon	Silent wave motor. A lens autofocus mechanism
T*	Carl Zeiss	T* Transparenz. Anti-reflection coating of lenses to reduce transmission losses.
T*	Sony	T* Transparenz. Anti-reflection coating of lenses to reduce transmission losses.
USD	Tamron	Ultrasonic silent drive. A lens autofocus mechanism
UMC	Samyang	Ultra multi coated. A lens ultra-multi-coating to reduce flare further
USM	Canon	Ultrasonic motor. A lens autofocus motor
VR	Nikon	Vibration reduction. see IS in general usage
WR	Pentax	Weather-resistant. Cameras and lenses with water resistant seals.

== General references ==
- Blair, John G. The Glossary of Digital Photography. Rocky Nook, 2007, ISBN 1-933952-04-0.
- Peres, Michael R. The Focal Encyclopedia of Photography, Fourth Edition. Focal, 2007, ISBN 0-240-80740-5.
- Taylor, Phil. Digital Photographic Imaging Glossary. Trafford, 2006, ISBN 1-55369-253-5.
- Glossary, issued by Nikon, explaining the Nikkor lens codes. Retrieved 2011-01-01.
