= Exposure compensation =

Photographic technique

Exposure compensation is a technique for adjusting the exposure indicated by a photographic exposure meter, in consideration of factors that may cause the indicated exposure to result in a less-than-optimal image. Factors considered may include unusual lighting distribution, variations within a camera system, filters, non-standard processing, or intended underexposure or overexposure. Cinematographers may also apply exposure compensation for changes in shutter angle or film speed (as exposure index), among other factors.

Many digital cameras have a menu setting, and often a physical dial, with which the photographer can increase or decrease the exposure. Each whole number on the scale represents one stop; decreasing the exposure by one stop halves the amount of light reaching the sensor, and the marks between the numbers usually represent 1/3 stop. The available range varies between models: for example, the Canon EOS R6 Mark II offers ±3 EV in 1/3- or 1/2-stop increments, while the Nikon Z 50 offers ±5 EV in steps of 1/3 or 1/2 EV.

== Exposure compensation on still cameras ==
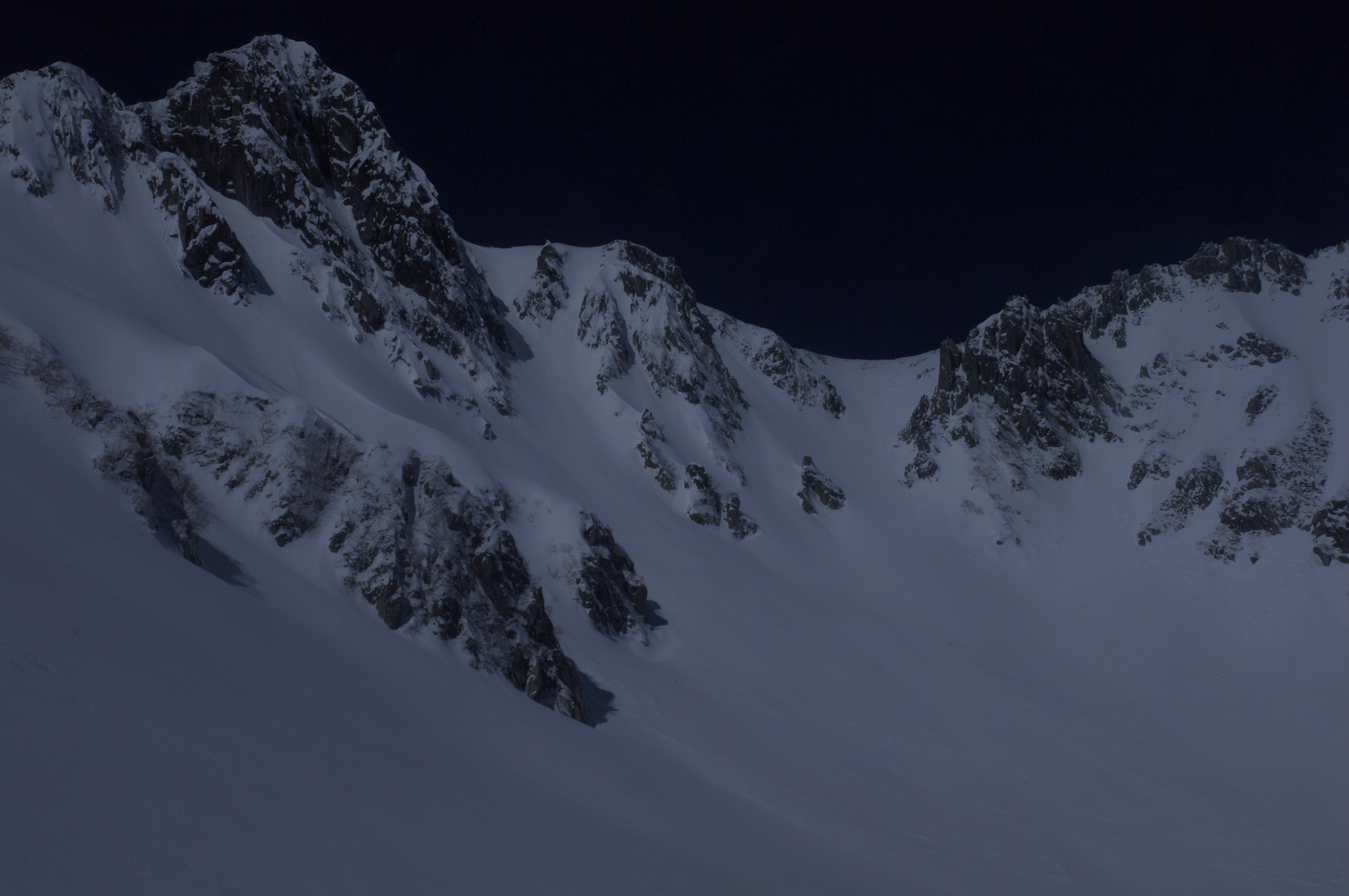
Snowy Mountains without exposure compensation

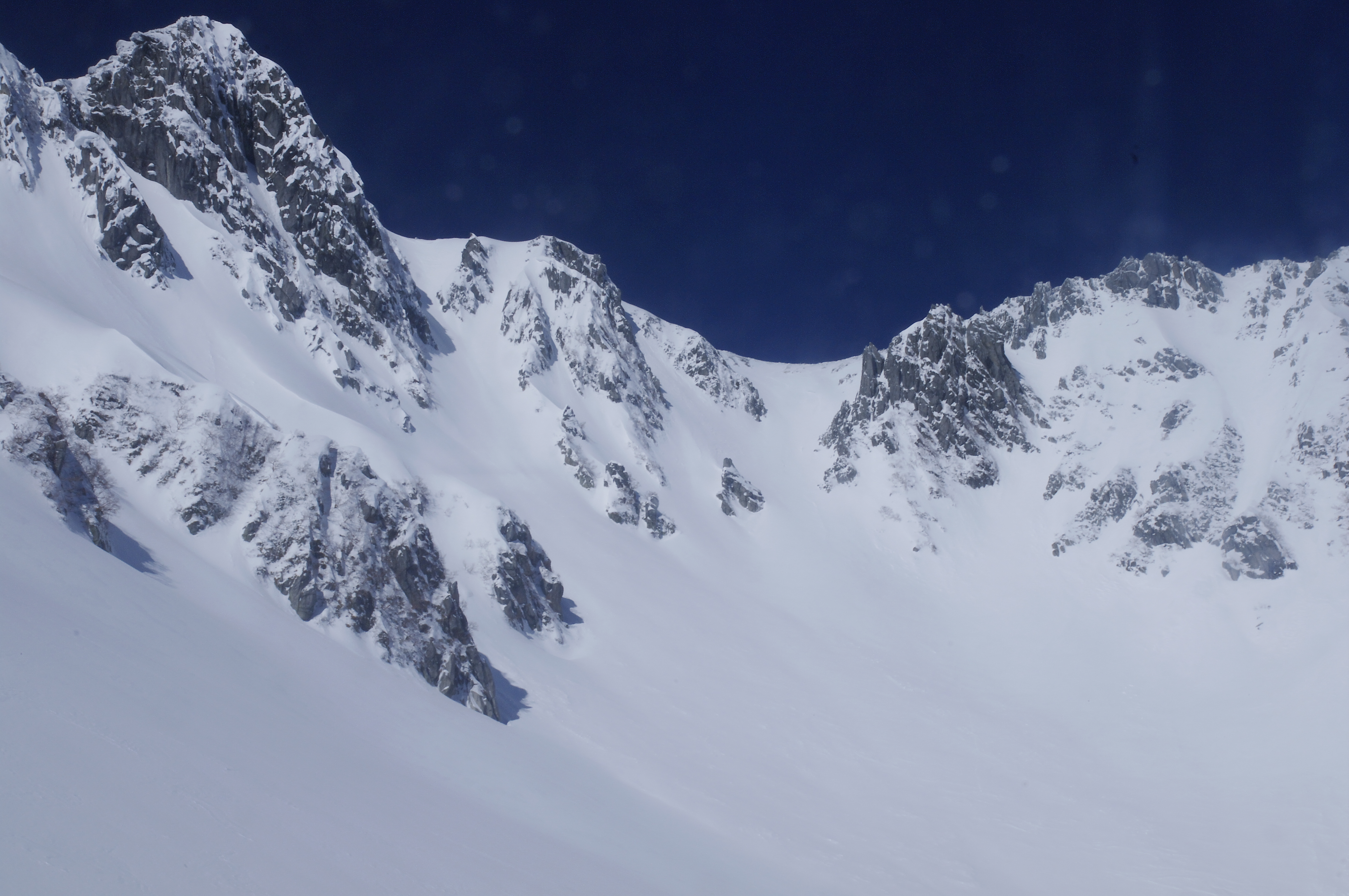
Same place with +2EV exposure compensation

In photography, some cameras include exposure compensation as a feature to allow the user to adjust the automatically calculated exposure. Compensation can be either positive (additional exposure) or negative (reduced exposure), and is frequently available in third- or half-step, less commonly in full steps or even quarter-step (Note: By default, the Minolta 7000 and 9000 (1985) support exposure-compensation in half-step increments over a range of ±4.0 EV, however, in conjunction with the Minolta Program Back Super 70 / 90 (PBS-70/PBS-90) or the 100-Exposure Back EB-90 quarter-steps are supported over an effective range of ±6.0 EV. In order to cope with the finer granularity, aperture and shutter speed settings are displayed in a proprietary suffixed notation, that is, a full f-stop of 2.8 is displayed as 2.8_{0}, the next quarter-steps would be 2.8_{1}, 2.8_{2}, 2.8_{3}, before it would continue with 4.0_{0}, etc.) increments, (Note: Photographers commonly refer to exposure changes in terms of "stops", but properly, an aperture stop is a device that regulates the amount of light, while a step is a division of a scale. The standard exposure scale consists of power-of-two steps; a one-step exposure increase doubles the exposure, while a one-step decrease halves the exposure; these steps are what are commonly referred to as stops.) usually up to two or three steps in either direction; a few film and some digital cameras allow a greater range of up to four, five (Note: The Nikon F5 (1996) and F6 (2004) support an exposure-compensation range of ±5.0 EV, as do all of the Nikon mirrorless Z-system cameras.) (Note: With Firmware 2.0, the Sony Alpha DSLR-A850 and DSLR-A900 support an extended exposure-compensation range of ±5.0 EV. (Sony press release as of 2 December 2010)) or even six steps in both directions. Camera exposure compensation is commonly stated in terms of EV units; 1 EV is equal to one exposure step (or stop), corresponding to a doubling of exposure.

Exposure can be adjusted by changing either the lens aperture or the exposure time; which one is changed usually depends on the camera's exposure mode. If the mode is aperture priority, exposure compensation changes the exposure time; if the mode is shutter priority, the aperture is changed. If a flash is being used, some cameras will adjust flash output as well.

== Adjustment for lighting distribution ==
The earliest reflected-light exposure meters were wide-angle, averaging types, measuring the average scene luminance. Exposure meter calibration was chosen to result in the "best" exposures for typical outdoor scenes; when measuring a single scene element (such as the side of a building in open shade), the indicated exposure is in the approximate middle of the film or electronic sensor's exposure range. When measuring a scene with atypical distribution of light and dark elements, or a single element that is lighter or darker than a middle tone, the indicated exposure may not be optimal. For example, a scene with predominantly light tones (e.g., a white horse) often will be underexposed, while a scene with predominantly dark tones (e.g., a black horse) often will be overexposed. That both scenes require the same exposure, regardless of the meter indication, becomes obvious from a scene that includes both a white horse and a black horse. A photographer usually can recognize the difference between a white horse and a black horse; a meter usually cannot. When metering a white horse, a photographer can apply exposure compensation so that the white horse is rendered as white.

Many modern cameras incorporate metering systems that measure scene contrast as well as average luminance, and employ sophisticated algorithms to infer the appropriate exposure from these data. In scenes with very unusual lighting, however, these metering systems sometimes cannot match the judgment of a skilled photographer, so exposure compensation still may be needed.

== Exposure compensation using the Zone System ==
An early application of exposure compensation was the Zone System developed by Ansel Adams and Fred Archer. Although the Zone System has sometimes been regarded as complex, the basic concept is quite simple: render dark objects as dark and light objects as light, according to the photographer's visualization. Developed for black-and-white film, the Zone System divided luminance (Note: Zones refer to exposure; Adams (1981) distinguishes among exposure zones, negative density values, and print values. The negative density value is controlled by exposure and the negative development; the print value is controlled by the negative density value, and the paper exposure and development.) into 11 zones, with Zone 0 representing pure black and Zone X (10) representing pure white. The meter indication would place whatever was metered on Zone V (5), a medium gray. The tonal range of color negative film is slightly less than that of black-and-white film, and the tonal range of color reversal film and digital sensors even less; accordingly, there are fewer zones between pure black and pure white. The meter indication, however, remains Zone V.

The relationship between exposure compensation and exposure zones is straightforward: an exposure compensation of one EV is equal to a change of one zone; thus exposure compensation of −1 EV is equivalent to placement on Zone IV, and exposure compensation of +2 EV is equivalent to placement on Zone VII.

The Zone System is a very specialized form of exposure compensation, and is used most effectively when metering individual scene elements, such as a sunlit rock or the bark of a tree in shade. Many cameras incorporate narrow-angle spot meters to facilitate such measurements. Because of the limited tonal range, an exposure compensation range of ±2 EV is often sufficient for using the Zone System with color film and digital sensors.

== See also ==
- Exposure value
- Exposure index
- Light meter
- Zone System
- Exposure bracketing
- Auto Exposure Bracketing (AEB)
