= Fred R. Archer =

American photographer (1889–1963)

Fred Robert Archer
- 1946 self-portrait of Fred R. Archer
- Born: December 3, 1889; Georgia, United States
- Died: April 27, 1963 (aged 73); Los Angeles, California, United States
- Occupations: Photographer, educator
- Organizations: Art Center School; Fred Archer School of Photography
- Known for: Co-developing the Zone System with Ansel Adams; Hollywood portrait photography Photography education
- Notable work: Fred Archer on Portraiture (1948)
- Awards: Stuyvesant Peabody Memorial Award (1959)

Fred Robert Archer (December 3, 1889 – April 27, 1963) was an American photographer who collaborated with Ansel Adams to create the Zone System. He was a portrait photographer, specializing early in his career in portraits of Hollywood movie stars. He was associated with the artistic trend in photography known as pictorialism. He later became a photography teacher, and ran his own photography school for many years.

Along with Edward Weston, whose portrait he took, Archer was known as one of the "two big names in art photography in those days out on the west coast". He socialized with and exchanged ideas with many other artists and intellectuals in Los Angeles for decades. He was "without a doubt, the individual with the longest history of participation in the Southern California Salon movement."

== Early life ==
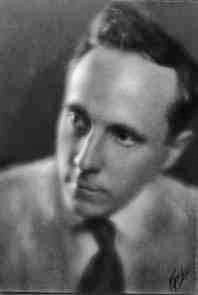
Edward Weston, taken by Fred Archer in approximately 1915

He was born on December 3, 1889, in Georgia, and his family moved to Los Angeles, California. Archer was experimenting with photography as early as 1915, when he made a portrait of Edward Weston. Archer served in a military aerial photography unit in France in World War I, and returned to the United States in May, 1919. He began studying commercial art, and photography was at that time a hobby of his. In less than a year, Archer gained critical attention in two east coast photography journals, American Photography and Photo-era Magazine, which reported that he had exhibited five "somber" photos of the World War I battlefields of France at the Seventh Pittsburgh Salon.

In the early 1920s, he was hired as assistant head of the Art Title Department for Universal Pictures and was promoted to head the department the following year. He soon moved on to motion picture photography.

== Hollywood portrait photographer ==
He worked for Warner Brothers as a portrait photographer until 1929, and later worked for Paramount Pictures. He also became a pioneer of advertising photography on the west coast.

In 1928, he wrote an influential article along with fellow photographer Elmer Fryer called "Still photography in motion picture work". Fryer succeeded Archer as head of photography at Warner Brothers in 1929.

Their article described the importance of still photography in advertising, marketing, production reference work and trick photography. According to Archer and Fryer, "A good 'still' will attract and hold attention where many poor ones will receive but a passing glance. Photography has striven for years to gain acceptance among the arts and the struggle has been long and hard. It is only within the last few years that photography has been raised from pure mechanics and given its well deserved place with the other arts." Their slogan was "the still sells the movies" which was a Hollywood truism for many years.

== Teacher and photography school ==
In 1935, Archer helped found the photography department and served as professor of photography at the Art Center School. Archer was considered "for many years a popular teacher and lecturer" who then went on to serve as director of education at his own Fred Archer School of Photography in Los Angeles, which he founded after World War II.

== Zone System ==
Archer collaborated with Ansel Adams to codify the Zone System, which is a photographic technique for determining optimal film exposure and development. The technique is based on the late 19th century sensitometry studies of Hurter and Driffield, and provides photographers with a systematic method of precisely defining the relationship between the way they visualize the photographic subject and the final results. Although it originated with black-and-white sheet film, the Zone System is also applicable to roll film, both black-and-white and color, negative and reversal, and to digital photography. Archer and Adams formulated the system while teaching together at the Art Center School in Los Angeles.

Ansel Adams went out of his way to give Archer equal credit for the Zone System: "I take this opportunity to restate that the Zone System is not an invention of mine; it is a codification of the principles of sensitometry, worked out by Fred Archer and myself at the Art Center School in Los Angeles, around 1939-40."

== Fred Archer on Portraiture ==
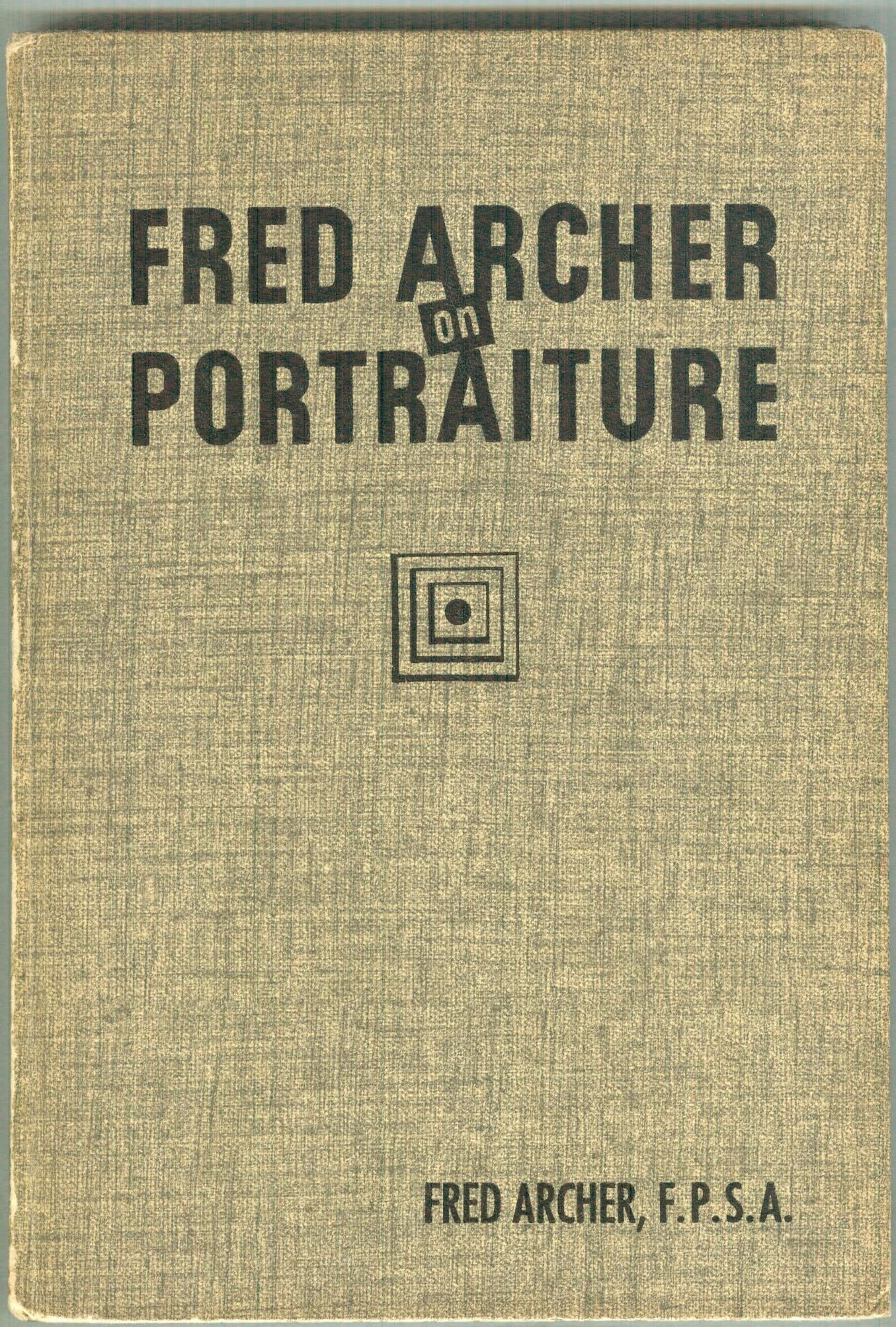
Cover of Fred Archer on Portraiture

Archer's only book, Fred Archer on Portraiture, was published in 1948. The book was a "popular text" that "remained in print for a number of years", and was reviewed in several national photography magazines.

== Legacy ==
In 1959, Archer won the annual Stuyvesant Peabody Memorial Award, given to a member of the Photographic Society of America "who has contributed significantly to Pictorial Photography".

Archer's photos were featured in a 1980-1981 show "Southern California Photography, 1900-1965: An Historical Survey" at the Los Angeles County Museum of Art, alongside the work of Edward Weston, Man Ray, Robert Frank, Diane Arbus, and Imogen Cunningham. The show was part of the bicentennial celebration of Los Angeles.

The Los Angeles County Museum of Art has seven photos by Archer in its permanent collection, including a self-portrait, described as a "surrealistic image of his face merging with the front of a large format camera and an obedient fly resting on his trigger finger".
