= Digital camera modes =

User selectable camera configurations

Generic mode dial for digital cameras showing some of the most common modes. (Actual mode dials can vary; for example point-and-shoot cameras seldom have manual modes.) Manual modes: Manual (M), Program (P), Shutter priority (S), Aperture priority (A). Automatic modes: Auto, Action, Portrait, Night Portrait, Landscape, Macro.

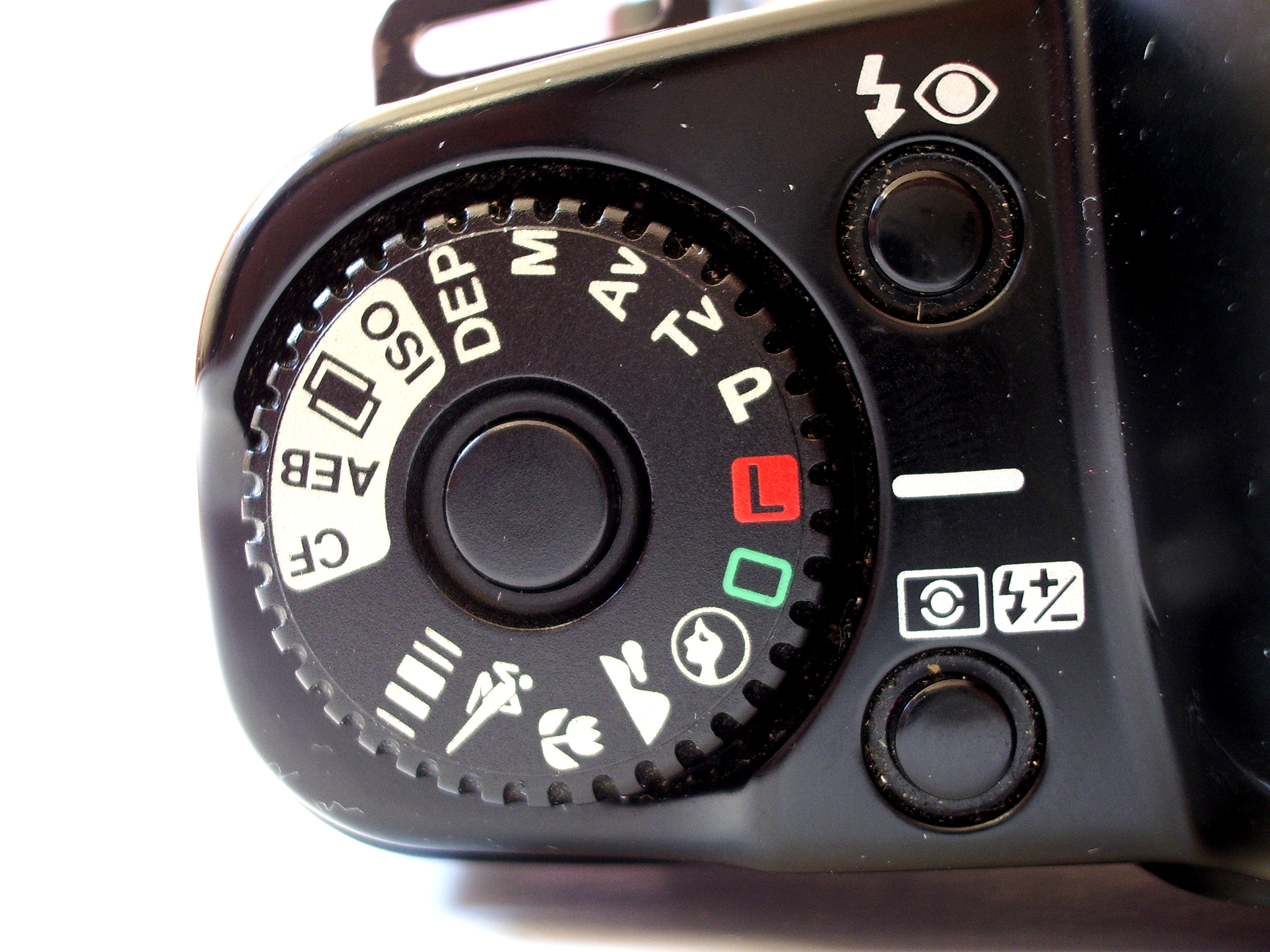
A dial with more modes

Most digital cameras support the ability to choose among a number of configurations, or modes for use in various situations. Professional DSLR or mirrorless cameras provide several manual modes; consumer point-and-shoot cameras emphasize automatic modes; amateur prosumer cameras often have a wide variety of both manual and automatic modes.

== Manual-enabled modes ==
Manual-enabled modes give the photographer control over the various parameters of exposure. There are three exposure parameters – aperture, time (shutter speed), and sensitivity (ISO), and in different modes, these are each set automatically or manually; this gives 2^{3} = 8 possible modes. For a given exposure, this is an underdetermined system, as there are three inputs but only one output. Accordingly, there are many combinations that result in the same exposure – for example, decreasing the aperture by one stop but increasing the exposure time or sensitivity to compensate, and there are various possible algorithms to automatically choose between these.

Most often, ISO is considered separately, being either set manually or set to Auto ISO, and then only aperture and shutter speed need be determined – either determines the other.

The four main modes, sometimes abbreviated "PASM", are:

- P: Program mode has the camera calculate both shutter speed and aperture (given a manually or automatically selected ISO). Higher-end cameras offer partial manual control to shift away from the automatically calculated values (increasing aperture and decreasing shutter time or conversely). The difference between Program mode and Full Auto mode is that in program mode, only the exposure is automatic, while other camera settings (e.g. shooting mode, exposure compensation, flash) can be set manually; in Full Auto mode, everything is automatic.
- A or Av: Aperture priority or Aperture value enables manual control of the aperture, and shutter speed is calculated by the camera for proper exposure (given an ISO sensitivity).
- S or Tv: Shutter priority or Time value enables manual control of the shutter speed, and aperture is calculated by the camera for proper exposure (given an ISO sensitivity).
- M: Manual mode both shutter speed and aperture are independently set manually (with ISO sensitivity also set manually), where proper image exposure requires accurate manual adjustment.

Together with setting ISO manually or automatically, this (PASM) yields the 4×2 = 8 possible combinations of manual/auto.

Exposure is further controlled in each of the above modes with an independent setting for:

- Ev: Exposure value enables an increase/decrease in image exposure compensation to make the resulting image brighter/darker, typically selectable in steps of whole or partial exposure "stops" (discrete widening/tightening of the aperture). Many cameras offer "exposure bracketing" where sequential images will be exposed at the different compensations selected, so as to increase the probability of a perfectly exposed image.

Less commonly seen modes include:

- Sv: Sensitivity priority or ISO priority controls the Sensitivity value (ISO speed), with both shutter and aperture calculated by camera, similar to Program mode. This mode is found on some Pentax cameras; on many cameras (such as Canon and Nikon) this is not a separate mode, but instead is accomplished by using Program mode and manually selecting an ISO.
- TAv: Some Pentax cameras such as Pentax K-50 has this mode for rapidly changing lights by using the widest aperture and the lowest ISO of continuously changing ISO between 1,000 and 3,200. The range of continuously changing ISO is dependent on the camera manufacture. Other manufacturers may provide this functionality through an automatic selection of ISO speed in manual mode.
- DEP: DEP (DEPth of field) mode, on some Canon cameras, set the aperture to yield the desired depth of field: one point at the nearest object that one wants to be in focus, half-presses the shutter, then points at the farthest object that one wants to be in focus, half-presses the shutter, at which point the camera sets both focus and aperture so that both objects are in focus. One then reframes the scene and fully depresses the shutter to take the photo. Unlike other modes, this also sets focus and requires two separate metering/focus stages.
- A-DEP: Canon also offers A-DEP (Automatic DEPth of field) mode on some cameras, which sets the depth of field and focus in a single shot. However, this requires lining up both the nearest and further objects on autofocus points at the same time, which may be difficult.

In cases where there is camera discretion (e.g., Auto ISO), different cameras allow different configurations of how decisions are made. For example, as of 2008, Nikon cameras allow one to set the maximum and minimum ISO sensitivities, and slowest shutter speed that will be used in automatic modes, while Canon cameras will select within the fixed range of ISO 400–ISO 800 in Auto ISO mode. In Nikon cameras, the Auto ISO mode first adjusts the shutter speed, keeping ISO at its minimum desired value, then, when shutter speed reaches the user-defined limit, the ISO is increased, up to the maximum value.

All of the above functions are independent of lens focus and stabilizing methods.

== Automatic modes ==
In automatic modes the camera determines all aspects of exposure, choosing exposure parameters according to the application within the constraints of correct exposure, including exposure, aperture, focusing, light metering, white balance, and equivalent sensitivity. For example, in portrait mode, the camera would use a wider aperture to render the background out of focus and would seek out and focus on a human face rather than other image content. In the same light conditions, a smaller aperture would be used for a landscape, and recognition of faces would not be enabled for focusing.

Some cameras have tens of modes. Many cameras do not document exactly what their many modes do (other that in general, based on the name); for full mastery of the camera, one must experiment with them.

In general:

- Action or sports modes increase ISO and use a faster shutter speed to capture the action.
- Landscape modes use a small aperture to gain depth of field. Flash may be deactivated.
- Text mode increases in-camera sharpening to allow photographing text.
- Portrait mode widens the aperture to throw the background out of focus (see Bokeh). The camera may recognize and focus on a human face.
- Night portrait modes use an exposure long enough to capture background detail, with fill-in flash to illuminate a nearby subject.
- Fireworks modes, for use on a tripod, use an extended exposure (around four seconds) which results in showing several fireworks as well as their paths.
- Water modes, depending on what the mode is designed to do, will either widen the aperture and increase the shutter speed for an action shot or shrink the aperture and slow down the shutter speed to show the motion of the water.
- Snow modes compensate for the misinformation the white snow gives the light meter and increases exposure in order to properly photograph subjects.
- Natural light or night snapshot modes attempt to raise the ISO and use a very wide aperture in order to take a photograph using the limited natural light, rather than a flash. In Fujifilm cameras, a variation of this mode takes two pictures: one with flash and other without it.
- High-sensitivity modes use the highest ISO available, albeit at lower resolutions in order to cope with noise.
- Macro or close-up modes tend to direct the camera's focus to be nearer the camera. They may shrink the aperture and restrict the camera to wide-angle in an attempt to broaden the depth-of-field (to include closer objects) – this last mode of operation is often known as Super Macro.
- Video/Movie mode allows a still camera to take videos.
- 'Scene' or Smart Shutter (SCN) mode (on Canons and Nikons) which uses face detection to take a picture either when a subject smiles, winks, or when a new subject enters the scene.
- Sunset modes enhance warm colors, such as those that can be found on sunsets.
- Dusk/Dawn mode, found on some Nikon compacts and MILCs, enhance the blue colors of twilights and dawns, as well as raise the ISO to compensate for the low levels of the light present then.
- Beach modes enhance blue colors such as those of the sea and sky as well as prevent underexposure because of strong sunlight.
- Starry sky mode, on Panasonic compact and bridge cameras, gives a long shutter speed (up to 60 seconds) to capture star trails as well as other subjects that require very long exposures.
- Foliage mode, present on Canon cameras, enhances green colors of vegetation.
- Pet portrait, found on some cameras, such as the Nikon Z50II, allows for easier photos of active pets

== Secondary modes ==
Aside from the main modes which control exposure, there are usually other, secondary settings common to digital cameras.

=== Drive mode ===
"Single" mode will take a single picture each time the shutter button is depressed. "Continuous" or "burst" mode will take multiple photographs in quick succession as long as the shutter button is held down, and is typically used to capture fast-moving subjects such as in sports photography.

Other drive modes commonly available include self-timer, which takes a picture several seconds after the shutter button is pressed; automatic exposure bracketing, used to take multiple photos each with different exposure settings; and remote shutter mode for use with a remote control accessory to trigger the camera at a distance. Some cameras also have an intervalometer mode for time-lapse photography, possibly with the option to automatically create a video from the pictures taken.

=== Autofocus ===
Autofocus (AF) can either activate until a lock is found (single, AF-S) or be continuously active (continuous, AF-C, servo). Single-mode is especially favored for stationary subjects, when focus, once found, should stay fixed, while the continuous mode is used for moving subjects. Some AF systems also include anticipation of the position of moving subjects – Canon calls this AI servo (for artificial intelligence) – or can automatically switch between single and continuous depending on whether the subject is moving – Canon calls this "AI focus".

A separate but often related distinction is between focus priority and release priority – whether the camera will take a picture when the subject is out of focus or not. In focus priority, the camera will only take a picture when the subject is in focus (as detected by the AF system), while in release priority, the camera will take a picture whenever the shutter is pressed. Release priority is particularly used of fast-moving subjects, which may not be perfectly in focus, or by experienced photographers, who wish to override the camera's judgment of whether the scene is in focus.

These are usually combined: for stationary subjects, AF is set to single (lock when found) and release is set to focus priority, while for moving subjects, AF is set to continuous and release is set to release priority. Manual focus is generally in release priority – AF is neither detected nor set.

Note that these "priority" modes should not be confused with the same word in exposure modes.

Focus priority can also be used for the trap focus trick: to take a picture only when a subject hits a focus point, by using AF to detect focus but not set it.

==== Back button focus ====
In most digital cameras, by default autofocus is only activated (AF-on) when the shutter button is pressed halfway down, which helps to preserve battery life. However, some photographers find that having AF-on and the shutter release on the same button makes it harder to establish the correct focus point, or hold it once the desired point is established. By using a separate shutter and focus button, focus can be locked at the same time as shooting without changing exposure, allowing the photographer to focus on the subject through the viewfinder.

One technique to make this easier to control is called back button focus: separating focus from the shutter control button by reassigning the AF-on function to a button on the back of the camera body. Some models of a camera may have a dedicated AF-ON button, and menu options to disable the focus via shutter button half-press. When photographing at golden hour and fighting off sun flare, the back button focus can become an essential tool to use.

Back button focus gives the benefit of being able to work with the three main possible focusing modes: manual focus, single focus, and continuous focus. It is a technique favored by many wildlife photographers due to the unpredictability of animal subjects.

=== Flash ===
Flash modes allow the user to choose between common settings such as: Fill flash, to always use flash; Auto flash, which will use flash in low-lit areas; Red-eye reduction, which may flash once before the actual photo in order to shrink the subject's pupils and reduce red-eye; or, Flash off, which will never use flash.

Flash can have its own exposure compensation–how brightly it flashes–which allows one to independently adjust the exposure of the foreground (lit by flash) and background (out of flash range).

=== Other modes ===
- Although also sometimes used as a scenery mode, macro modes are often not used with the scene mode and rather only change the focus area and nothing else.
- Some cameras provide options for fine-tuning settings such as sharpness and saturation, which may be referred to as "Styles" or "Films".
- Some cameras offer color-altering settings to do things such as make the photograph black-and-white or sepia, swap specific colors, or isolate colors.

== See also ==
- Mode dial
- Photography
