= Zone System =

Photographic technique

The Zone System is a photographic technique for determining optimal film exposure and development, formulated by Ansel Adams and Fred Archer. Adams described the Zone System as "not an invention of mine; it is a codification of the principles of sensitometry, worked out by Fred Archer and myself at the Art Center School in Los Angeles, around 1939–40".

The technique is based on the late 19th-century sensitometry studies of Hurter and Driffield. The Zone System provides photographers with a systematic method of precisely defining the relationship between the way they visualize the photographic subject and the final results. Although it originated with black-and-white sheet film, the Zone System is also applicable to roll film, both black-and-white and color, negative and reversal, and to digital photography.

== Principles ==
=== Visualization ===
An expressive image involves the arrangement and rendering of various scene elements according to the photographer's desire. Achieving the desired image involves image management (placement of the camera, choice of lens, and possibly the use of camera movements) and control of image values. The Zone System is concerned with the control of image values, ensuring that light and dark values are rendered as desired. Anticipation of the final result before making the exposure is known as visualization.

=== Exposure metering ===
Any scene of photographic interest contains elements of different luminance; consequently, the "exposure" actually is many different exposures. The exposure time is the same for all elements, but the image illuminance varies with the luminance of each subject element.

Exposure is often determined using a reflected-light exposure meter. The earliest meters measured overall average luminance; meter calibration was established to give satisfactory exposures for typical outdoor scenes. However, if the part of a scene that is metered includes large areas of unusually high or low reflectance, or unusually large areas of highlight or shadow, the "effective" average reflectance may differ substantially from that of a "typical" scene, and the rendering may not be as desired.

An averaging meter cannot distinguish between a subject of uniform luminance and one that consists of light and dark elements. When exposure is determined from average luminance measurements, the exposure of any given scene element depends on the relationship of its reflectance to the effective average reflectance. For example, a dark object of 4% reflectance would be given a different exposure in a scene of 20% effective average reflectance than it would be given in a scene of 12% reflectance. In a sunlit outdoor scene, the exposure for the dark object would also depend on whether the object was in sunlight or shade. Depending on the scene and the photographer's objective, any of the previous exposures might be acceptable. However, in some situations, the photographer might wish to specifically control the rendering of the dark object; with overall average metering, this is difficult if not impossible. When it is important to control the rendering of specific scene elements, alternative metering techniques may be required.

It is possible to make a meter reading of an individual scene element, but the exposure indicated by the meter will render that element as a medium gray; in the case of a dark object, that result is usually not what is desired. Even when metering individual scene elements, some adjustment of the indicated exposure is often needed if the metered scene element is to be rendered as visualized.

=== Exposure zones ===
In the Zone System, measurements are made of individual scene elements, and exposure is adjusted based on the photographer's knowledge of what is being metered: a photographer knows the difference between freshly fallen snow and a black horse, while a meter does not. Much has been written on the Zone System, but the concept is simple—render light subjects as light, and dark subjects as dark, according to the photographer's visualization. The Zone System assigns numbers from 0 through 10 to different brightness values, with 0 representing black, 5 middle gray, and 10 pure white; these values are known as zones. To make zones easily distinguishable from other quantities, Adams and Archer used Roman rather than Arabic numerals. Strictly speaking, zones refer to exposure, with a Zone V exposure (the meter indication) resulting in a mid-tone rendering in the final image. Each zone differs from the preceding or following zone by a factor of two, so that a Zone I exposure is twice that of Zone 0, and so forth. A one-zone change is equal to one stop, corresponding to standard aperture and shutter controls on a camera. Evaluating a scene is particularly easy with a meter that indicates in exposure value (EV), because a change of one EV (e.g. one f-stop) is equal to a change of one zone.

Many small- and medium-format cameras include provision for exposure compensation; this feature works well with the Zone System, especially if the camera includes spot metering, but obtaining proper results requires careful metering of individual scene elements and making appropriate adjustments.

=== Zones, the physical world and the print ===
The relationship between the physical scene and the print is established by characteristics of the negative and the print. Exposure and development of the negative are usually determined so that a properly exposed negative will yield an acceptable print on a specific photographic paper.

Although zones directly relate to exposure, visualization relates to the final result. A black-and-white photographic print represents the visual world as a series of tones ranging from black to white. Imagine all of the tonal values that can appear in a print, represented as a continuous gradation from black to white:

Full tonal gradation

From this starting point, zones are formed by first dividing the tonal gradation into ten equal sections, all one stop apart, plus one more for blown-out paper white.

Eleven-step gradation

Note: The darker shades may not be distinguishable on some monitors.

Then for each section, one average tone represents all the tonal values in that section.

Eleven symbolic tones

Finally, the zones are defined by numbering each section with Roman numerals from 0 for the black section to X for the white one.

The zone scale
0	I	II	III	IV	V	VI	VII	VIII	IX	X

=== Zones as tone and texture ===
Adams distinguished among three different exposure scales for the negative:

- The full range from black to white, represented by Zone 0 through Zone X.
- The dynamic range comprising Zone I through Zone IX, which Adams considered to represent the darkest and lightest "useful" negative densities.
- The textural range comprising Zone II through Zone VIII. This range of zones conveys a sense of texture and the recognition of substance.

He noted that negatives can record detail through Zone XII and even higher, but that bringing this information within the exposure scale of the print is extremely difficult with normal processing.

Adams described the zone scale and its relationship to typical scene elements:

Description of Zone System zones
Zone	Tones	Description
0		Pure black: no detail
I		Near black, with slight tonality but no texture
II		Textured black; the darkest part of the image in which slight detail is recorded
III		Average dark materials and low values showing adequate texture
IV		Average dark foliage, dark stone, or landscape shadows
V		Middle gray: clear north sky; dark skin, average weathered wood
VI		Average light skin; light stone; shadows on snow in sunlit landscapes
VII		Very light skin; shadows in snow with acute side lighting
VIII		Lightest tone with texture; textured snow
IX		Slight tone without texture; glaring snow
X		Pure white: light sources and specular reflections; paper white; no detail
Note: The tones of the Zone System zones are set against 20%, 50%, and 80% backgrounds.

For cinematography, in general, parts of the scene falling in Zone III will have textured black, and objects on Zone VII will have textured white. In other words, if the text on a piece of white paper is to be readable, light and expose the white so that it falls on Zone VII. This is a rule of thumb. Some film stocks have steeper curves than others, and the cinematographer needs to know how each one handles all shades of black-to-white.

== Technique ==
=== Effective film speed ===
The International Standards Organization (ISO) standard for black-and-white negative film, ISO 6:1993, specifies development criteria that may differ from those used in practical photography (previous standards, such as ANSI PH2.5-1979, also specified chemistry and development technique). Consequently, the Zone System practitioner often must determine the speed for a particular combination of film, developer, and enlarger type; the speed determination is commonly based on Zone I. Although the method for determining speed for the Zone System is conceptually similar to the ISO method for determining speed, the Zone System speed is an effective speed rather than an ISO speed.

=== Exposure ===
A dark surface under a bright light can reflect the same amount of light as a light surface under dim light. The human eye would perceive the two as being very different, but a light meter would measure only the amount of light reflected, and its recommended exposure would render either as Zone V. The Zone System provides a straightforward method for rendering these objects as the photographer desires. The key element in the scene is identified, and that element is placed on the desired zone; the other elements in the scene then fall where they may. With negative film, exposure often favors shadow detail; the procedure then is to:

1. Visualize the darkest area of the subject in which detail is required and place it on Zone III. The exposure for Zone III is important, because if the exposure is insufficient, the image may not have satisfactory shadow detail. If the shadow detail is not recorded at the time of exposure, nothing can be done to add it later.
2. Carefully meter the area visualized as Zone III and note the meter's recommended exposure (the meter gives a Zone V exposure).
3. Adjust the recommended exposure so that the area is placed on Zone III rather than Zone V. To do this, use an exposure two stops less than the meter's recommendation.

=== Development ===
For every combination of film, developer, and paper there is a "normal" development time that will allow a properly exposed negative to give a reasonable print. In many cases, this means that values in the print will display as recorded (e.g. Zone V as Zone V, Zone VI as Zone VI, and so on). In general, optimal negative development will be different for every type and grade of paper.

It is often desirable for a print to exhibit a full range of tonal values; this may not be possible for a low-contrast scene if the negative is given normal development. However, the development can be increased to increase the negative contrast so that the full range of tones is available. This technique is known as expansion, and the development usually referred to as "plus" or "N+". Criteria for plus development vary among different photographers; Adams used it to raise a Zone VII placement to Zone VIII in the print, and referred to it as "N + 1" development.

Conversely, if the negative for a high-contrast scene is given normal development, desired detail may be lost in either shadow or highlight areas, and the result may appear harsh. However, development can be reduced so that a scene element placed on Zone IX is rendered as Zone VIII in the print; this technique is known as contraction, and the development usually referred to as "minus" or "N−". When the resulting change is one zone, it is usually called "N − 1" development.

It sometimes is possible to make greater adjustments, using "N + 2" or "N − 2" development, and occasionally even beyond.

Development has the greatest effect on dense areas of the negative, so that the high values can be adjusted with minimal effect on the low values. The effect of expansion or contraction gradually decreases with tones darker than Zone VIII (or whatever value is used for control of high values).

Specific times for N+ or N− developments are determined either from systematic tests, or from development tables provided by certain Zone System books.

=== Additional darkroom processes ===
Adams generally used selenium toning when processing prints. Selenium toner acts as a preservative and can alter the color of a print, but Adams used it subtly, primarily because it can add almost a full zone to the tonal range of the final print, producing richer dark tones that still hold shadow detail. His book The Print described using the techniques of dodging and burning to selectively darken or lighten areas of the final print.

The Zone System requires that every variable in photography, from exposure to darkroom production of the print, be calibrated and controlled. The print is the last link in a chain of events, no less important to the Zone System than exposure and development of the film. With practice, the photographer visualizes the final print before the camera shutter is released.

== Application to other media ==
=== Roll film ===
Unlike sheet film, in which each negative can be individually developed, an entire roll must be given the same development, so that N+ and N− development are normally unavailable. The key element in the scene is placed on the desired zone, and the rest of the scene falls where it will. Some contrast control is still available with the use of different paper grades. Adams (1981, pp. 93–95) described use of the Zone System with roll film. In most cases, he recommended N − 1 development when a single roll was to be exposed under conditions of varying contrast, so that exposure could be sufficient to give adequate shadow detail but avoid excessive density and grain build-up in the highlights.

=== Color film ===
Because of color shifts, color film usually does not lend itself to variations in development time. Use of the Zone System with color film is similar to that with black-and-white roll film, except that the exposure range is somewhat less, so that there are fewer zones between black and white. The exposure scale of color reversal film is less than that of color negative film, and the procedure for exposure usually is different, favoring highlights rather than shadows; the shadow values then fall where they will. Whatever the exposure range, the meter indication results in a Zone V placement. Adams (1981, pp. 95–97) described the application to color film, both negative and reversal.

=== Digital photography ===
The Zone System can be used in digital photography just as in film photography; Adams (1981, p. xiii) himself anticipated the digital image. As with color reversal film, the normal procedure is to expose for the highlights and process for the shadows.

Early digital sensors had a much narrower dynamic range than color negative film, which, in turn, has less range than monochrome film, but an increasing number of digital cameras have achieved wider dynamic ranges. One of the first was Fujifilm's FinePix S3 Pro digital SLR (announced in February 2004), whose "Super CCD SR" sensor was specifically developed to overcome the issue of limited dynamic range. Each of its photosites has two photodiodes: a normal-sensitivity "S" photodiode and a smaller, less sensitive "R" photodiode that records highlight detail beyond the point at which the S photodiode saturates; the camera combines the two signals to extend the dynamic range.

Greater scene contrast can be accommodated by making one or more exposures of the same scene using different exposure settings and then combining those images. It often suffices to make two exposures, one for the shadows, and one for the highlights; the images are then overlapped and blended appropriately, so that the resulting composite represents a wider range of colors and tones. Combining images is often easier if the image-editing software includes features, such as the automatic layer alignment in Adobe Photoshop, that assist precise registration of multiple images. Even greater scene contrast can be handled by using more than two exposures and combining with a feature such as Merge to HDR in Photoshop CS2 and later. A simplified, automated form of the technique appeared as an HDR setting on the iPhone 4 with the iOS 4.1 update in 2010, which combines several exposures into a single image; beginning with the iPhone XS in 2018, Apple's Smart HDR merges a buffer of frames taken at different exposures for each photograph.

The tonal range of the final image depends on the characteristics of the display medium. Monitor contrast can vary significantly, depending on the type (CRT, LCD, etc.), model, and calibration (or lack thereof). A computer printer's tonal output depends on the number of inks used and the paper on which it is printed. Similarly, the density range of a traditional photographic print depends on the processes used as well as the paper characteristics.

==== Histograms ====
Most high-end digital cameras allow viewing a histogram of the tonal distribution of the captured image. This histogram, which shows the concentration of tones, running from dark on the left to light on the right, can be used to judge whether a full tonal range has been captured, or whether the exposure should be adjusted, such as by changing the exposure time, lens aperture, or ISO speed, to ensure a tonally rich starting image. A technique called ETTR (exposing to the right) based on histogram reading rather than exposure metering is shown to be more appropriate for digital sensors to extract more visual information out of them for further processing in editing.

== Misconceptions and criticisms ==
The Zone System gained an early reputation for being complex, difficult to understand, and impractical to apply to real-life shooting situations and equipment.

Criticism has been raised on grounds that the Zone System obscures simple densitometry considerations by needlessly introducing its own terminology for otherwise trivial concepts. Noted photographer Andreas Feininger wrote in 1976:

I deliberately omitted discussing the so-called Zone System of film exposure determination in this book because in my opinion it makes mountains out of molehills, complicates matters out of all proportions, does not produce any results that cannot be accomplished more easily with methods discussed in this text, and is a ritual if not a form of cult rather than a practical technical procedure.

Much of the difficulty may have resulted from Adams's early books, which he wrote without the assistance of a professional editor; he later conceded (Adams 1985, p. 325) that this was a mistake. Fred Picker (The Zone VI Workshop 1974) provided a concise and simple treatment that helped demystify the process. Adams's later Photography Series published in the early 1980s (and written with the assistance of Robert Baker) also proved more comprehensible to the average photographer.

The Zone System has often been thought to apply only to certain materials, such as black-and-white sheet film and black-and-white photographic prints. At a time when introduction of electronic still-image cameras to the consumer market was imminent (e.g. the Sony Mavica), Adams (1981, p. xii) stated:

I believe the electronic image will be the next major advance. Such systems will have their own inherent and inescapable structural characteristics, and the artist and functional practitioner will again strive to comprehend and control them.

This is sometimes interpreted as evidence that Adams envisioned his Zone System to be useful for electronic or even digital image capture/processing. However, in this quotation there is no claim that the Zone System would be a suitable instrument to comprehend and control the new imaging devices, and Adams explicitly states that electronic systems may have their own characteristics, which might thus require different approaches.

Yet another misconception is that the Zone System emphasizes technique at the expense of creativity. Some practitioners have treated the Zone System as if it were an end in itself, but Adams made it clear that the Zone System was an enabling technique rather than the ultimate objective.

== See also ==
- Densitometry
- Digital negative
- Grayscale
