= Mode dial =

Generic mode dial for digital cameras showing several common modes. Actual dials may have more or fewer.

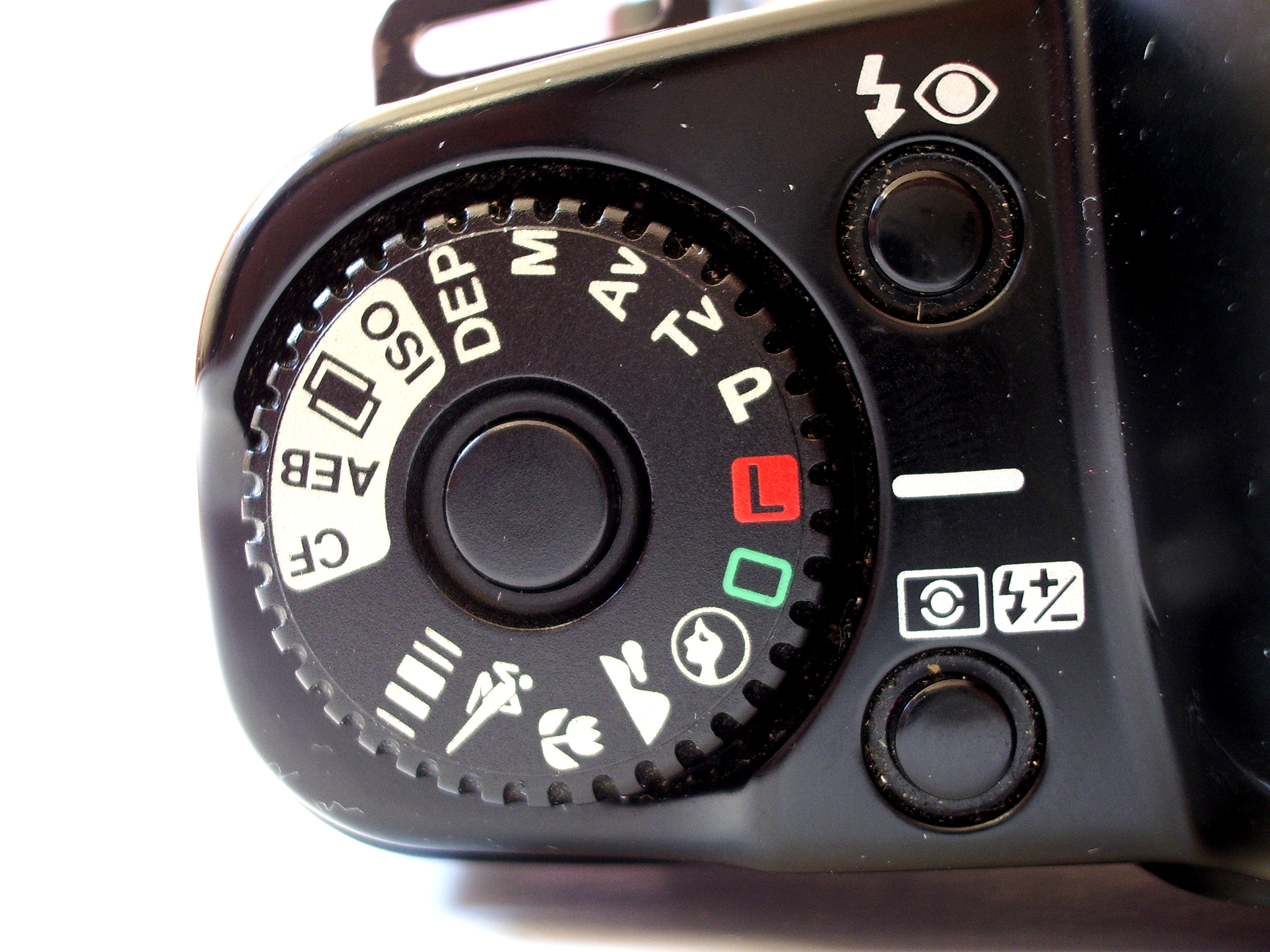
Some dials have more modes.

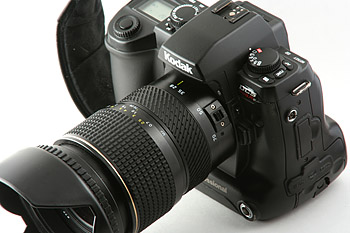
A Kodak DSLR with the mode dial located near the flash/viewfinder hump.

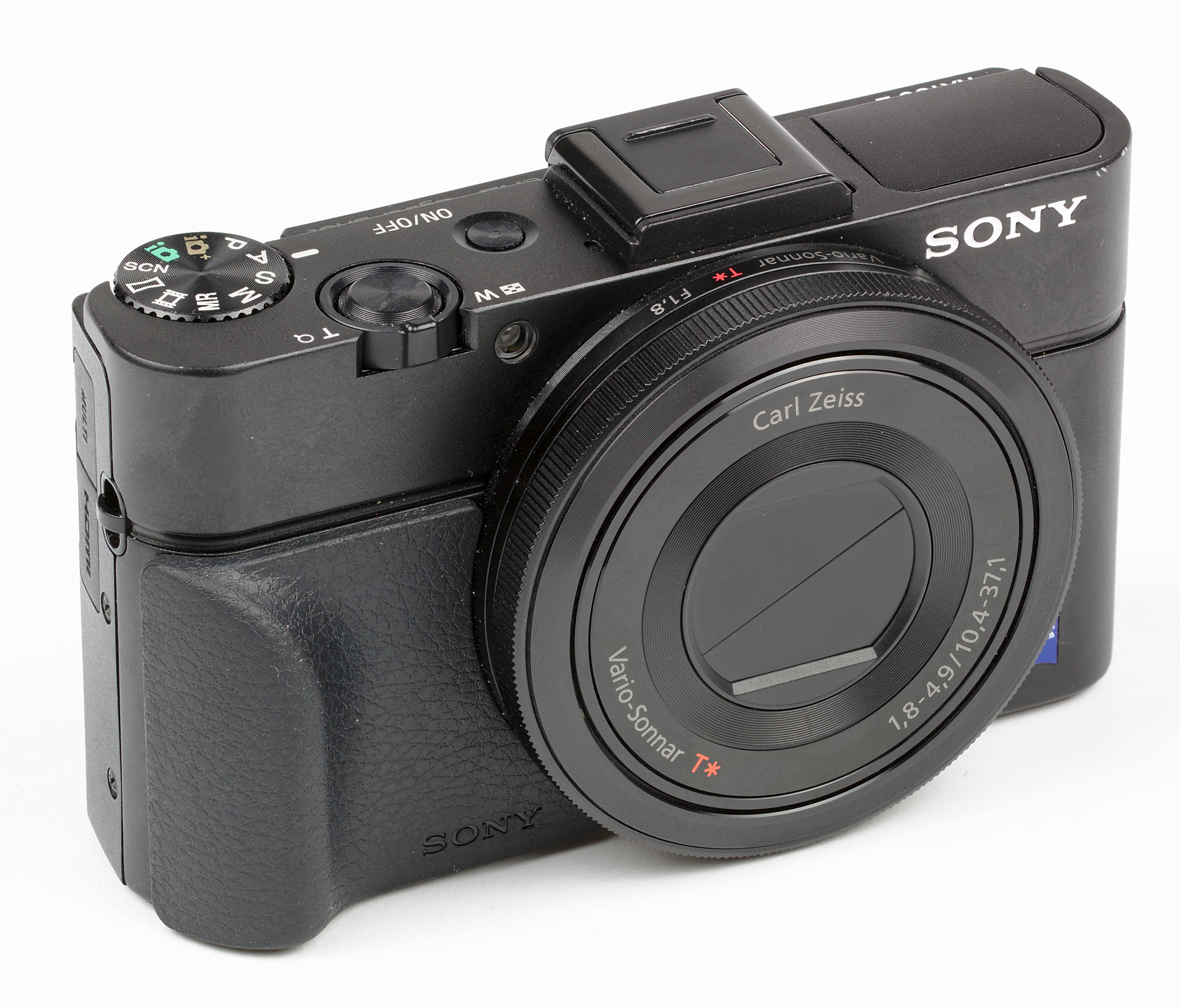
Sony Cyber-shot DSC-RX100 II, with two distinct automatic modes: "intelligent auto" (green "i📷") and "superior auto" (golden "i📷+")

A mode dial or camera dial is a dial used on digital cameras to change the camera's mode. Most digital cameras, including DSLR and mirrorless cameras, support modes, selectable either by a rotary dial or from a menu. On point-and-shoot cameras which support modes a range of scene types is offered. On DSLR and mirrorless cameras, mode dials usually offer access to manual settings. The more compact point-and-shoot cameras, and cameras offering a great many modes, do not have mode dials, using menus instead, while others, such as the Nikon Z50II, use a combination of a single scene setting, followed by a menu selection of the specific type of scene. Some interchangeable lenses themselves offer control over things such as aperture, reducing the need for mode support in the camera body.

== Location of the dial ==
On most DSLRs and mirrorless cameras, the mode dial is located at the top of the camera, to one side of the flash/viewfinder hump. On point-and-shoot cameras, particularly those with a thin body, the dial is found on the back of the camera, and it is often coupled with a menu-navigation button. Some thin cameras use a slide switch rather than a dial.

== Modes ==
Various camera types and specific cameras have different modes. The simpler dial in the top illustration has:

- Manual modes, often abbreviated PASM: Program (P), Aperture priority (A), Shutter priority (S), Manual (M).
- Automatic modes: Auto, Action, Portrait, Night portrait, Landscape, Macro.

Most DSLRs and mirrorless cameras have a few manual settings and a small sample of automatic modes. On point-and-shoot cameras, all manual control may be condensed into one mode (e.g. ASP, for Aperture priority, Shutter priority, Program) or may be completely absent. Many compact cameras show a large array of scene modes. Digital cameras usually have a movie mode to capture videos.

Detailed information found by users on the modes supported by digital cameras are to be found in the ongoing list of digital camera modes.

=== Manual modes ===
Manual modes include:

- P: Program mode offers the photographer partial control over shutter speed and aperture.
- A or Av: Aperture priority AKA "Aperture value" allows the photographer to control the aperture, while the shutter speed and ISO sensitivity are calculated by the camera.
- S or Tv: Shutter priority AKA "Time value" allows the photographer to control the shutter speed, while the aperture and ISO sensitivity are calculated by the camera.
- M: Manual mode allows the photographer to control shutter speed, aperture and ISO independently.
- U: User mode (like program with preset). On cameras supporting user modes, such as the Nikon Z50II, there are multiple values with numbers, such as U1, U2, and U3.
- Sv: Sensitivity value allows the photographer to control the ISO sensitivity, while aperture and shutter speed are calculated by the camera (this is a Pentax DSLR feature)

=== Automatic scene modes ===
In automatic modes the camera determines all aspects of exposure, choosing exposure parameters according to the application within the constraints of correct exposure, including exposure, aperture, focussing, light metering, white balance, and equivalent sensitivity. For example, in portrait mode the camera would use a wider aperture to render the background out of focus, and would seek out and focus on a human face rather than other image content. In the same light conditions a smaller aperture would be used for a landscape, and recognition of faces would not be enabled for focusing.

Some cameras have tens of modes, showing the majority only in the menu rather than on the dial. Others, such as the Nikon Z50II, have a single SCN item on the mode dial, with a selection of the specific scene type made on the back screen (i.e., not in the menu system). Many cameras do not document exactly what their many modes do; for full mastery of the camera one must experiment with them.

In general:

- Action or sport mode increases ISO and uses a fast shutter speed to capture action.
- Landscape mode uses a small aperture to gain depth of field.
- Portrait mode widens the aperture to throw the background out of focus. The camera may recognise and focus on a human face.
- Night portrait mode uses an exposure long enough to capture background detail, with fill-in flash to illuminate a nearby subject.

Other scene modes found on many cameras include Fireworks, Snow, Natural light/Night snapshot, Macro/Close-up, and Movie mode, although many cameras capable of shooting movies have a dedicated switch to go between stills and movies. On cameras not aimed at amateur photographers, automatic scene modes may be absent entirely.

== See also ==
- Digital camera modes
- Shutter priority
- Aperture priority
- Digital ISO sensitivity
- Digital camera
- Digital SLR
- Mirrorless camera
