= Aperture priority =

Setting on a photo camera that enables choosing a specific aperture value

A Nikon-style mode dial showing aperture priority mode.

Aperture priority, often abbreviated A or Av (for aperture value) on a camera mode dial, is a mode on some cameras that allows the user to set a specific aperture value (f-number) while the camera selects a shutter speed to match it that will result in proper exposure based on the lighting conditions as measured by the camera's light meter. This is different from manual mode, where the user must decide both values, shutter priority where the user picks a shutter speed with the camera selecting an appropriate aperture, or program mode where the camera selects both.

== Uses ==
=== Depth of field ===
As an image's depth of field is inversely proportional to the size of the lens's aperture, aperture priority mode is often used to allow the photographer to control the focus of objects in the frame. Aperture priority is therefore useful in landscape photography, where it may be desirable for everything from foreground to background to be sharp, while shutter speed is immaterial, especially when using a tripod. To obtain this large depth of field, a narrow aperture (identified by a high f-number, e.g. f/16 or f/22) is necessary. Aperture priority mode also finds use in portrait photography, where a wide aperture (identified by a low number, e.g. f/1.4 or f/2.8) and therefore smaller depth of field may be desired to throw the background out of focus and make it less distracting.

=== Shutter speed ===
Another common use of aperture priority mode is to indirectly affect shutter speed for a desired effect. In landscape photography, a user might select a small aperture when photographing a waterfall, so that the camera will select a slow shutter speed (to allow a sufficient amount of light to reach the film or sensor for proper exposure), thereby causing the water to blur through the frame. At the contrary, a larger aperture allows to shorten the shutter speed reducing the hand jitter by taking a picture without a tripod or, in alternative, a lower ISO to enhance the image quality by reducing the noise. When shooting a portrait in dim lighting, the photographer might choose to open the lens to its maximum aperture in hopes of getting enough light for a good exposure while maintaining the shortest possible shutter speed to reduce blur.

== See also ==
- Digital camera modes
- Shutter priority
