= Shutter priority =

Setting on cameras that allows the user to choose a specific shutter speed

A Nikon-style mode dial showing shutter priority mode.

Shutter priority (usually denoted as S on the mode dial), also called time value (abbreviated as Tv), refers to a setting on cameras that allows the user to choose a specific shutter speed while the camera adjusts the aperture to ensure correct exposure. This is different from manual mode, where the user must decide both values, aperture priority where the user picks an aperture with the camera selecting the shutter speed to match, or program mode where the camera selects both.

== Background ==
Shutter priority with longer exposures is chosen to create an impression of motion. For example, a waterfall will appear blurred and fuzzy. If the camera is panned with a moving subject, the background will appear blurred. When photographing sports or high-speed phenomena, shutter priority with short exposures can ensure that the motion is effectively frozen in the resulting image.

Like aperture priority, this mode allows for partial automation thus decreasing the need for total concentration.

Shutter priority is often abbreviated as S (with Nikon, Minolta, Konica Minolta, Sony, Olympus, Sigma, Panasonic) or Tv (for "time value" with Canon, Pentax, Leica) on a camera mode dial.

== See also ==
- Digital camera modes
