= Exposure (photography) =

Amount of light captured by a camera

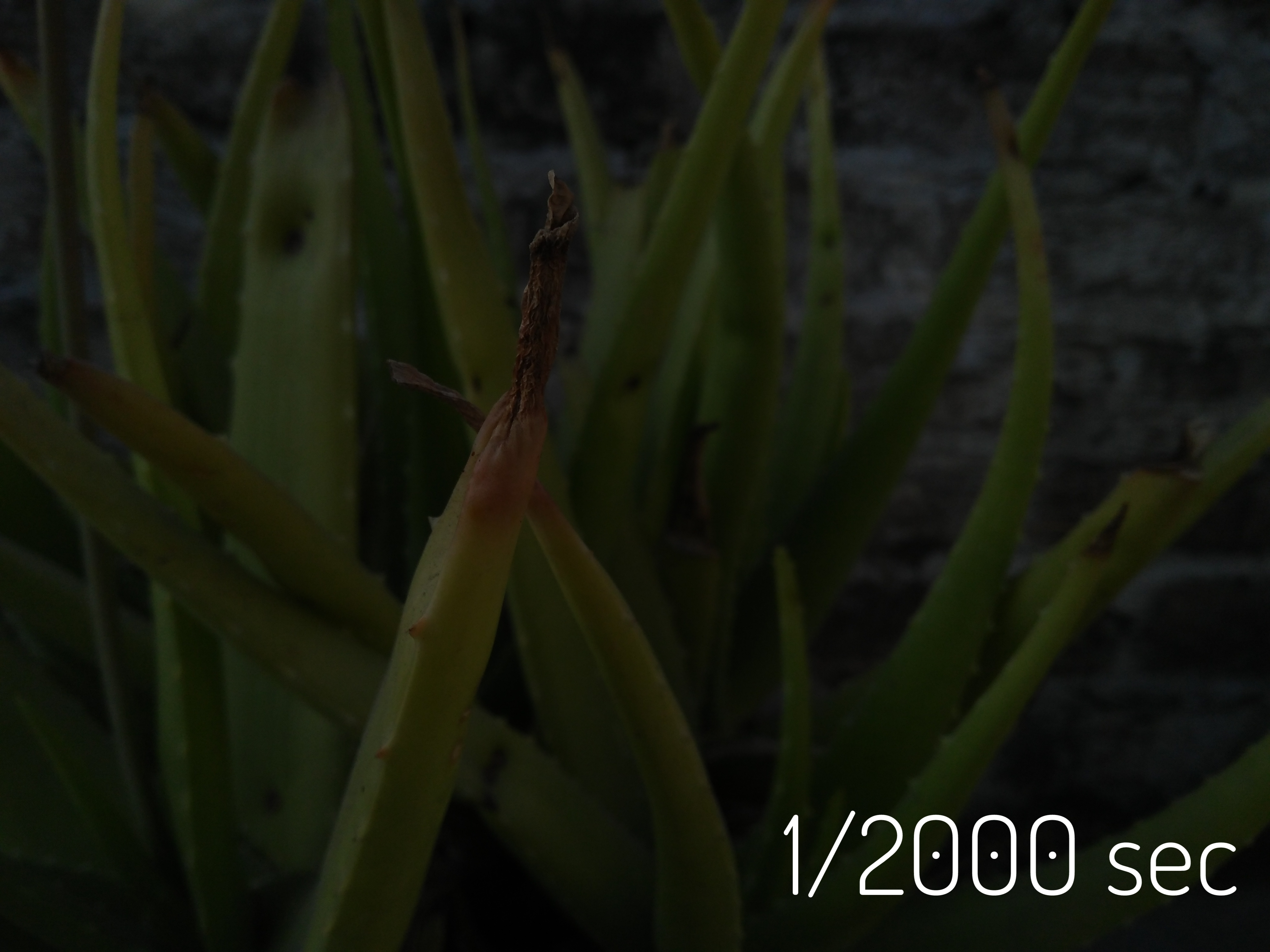
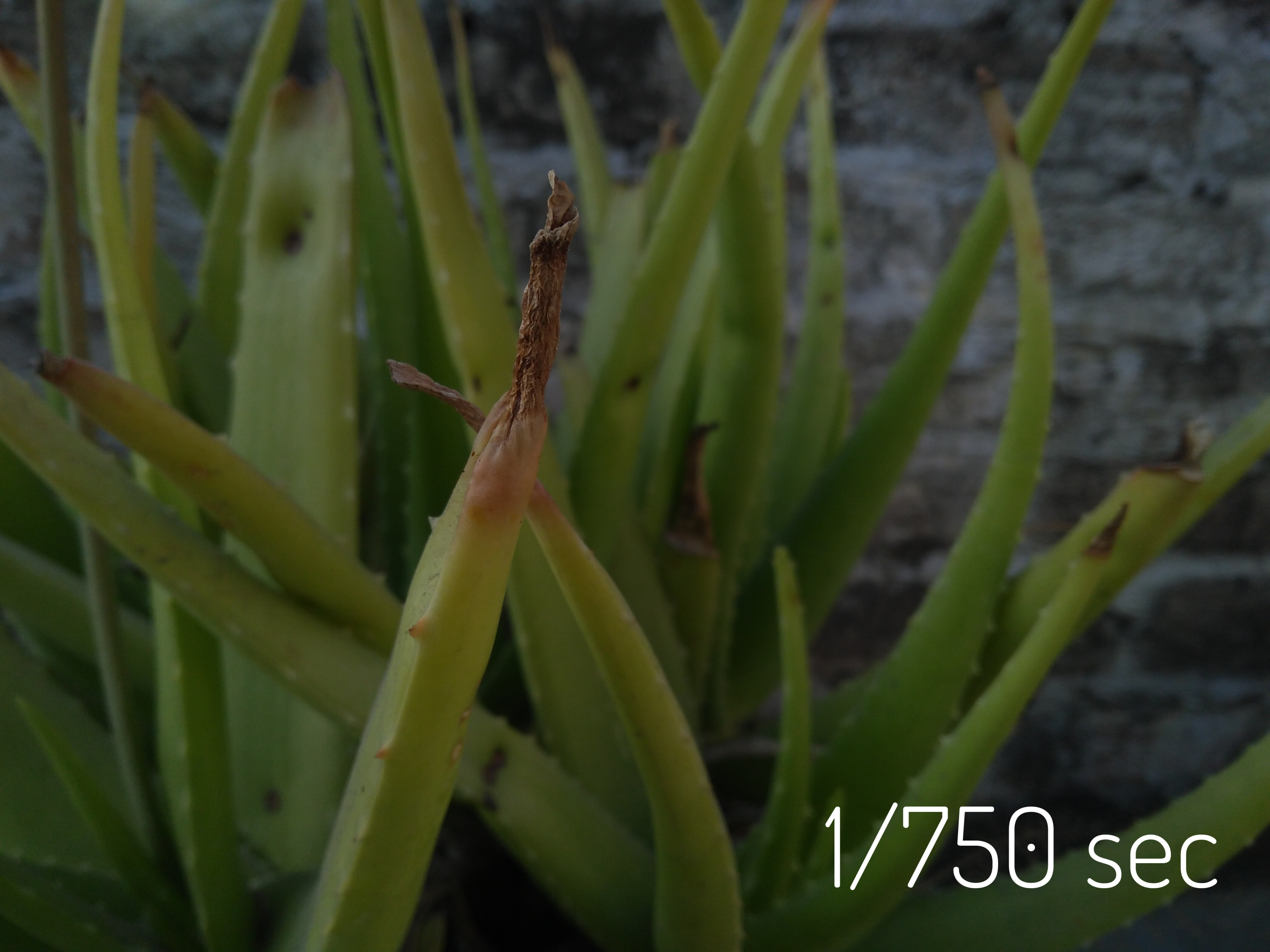
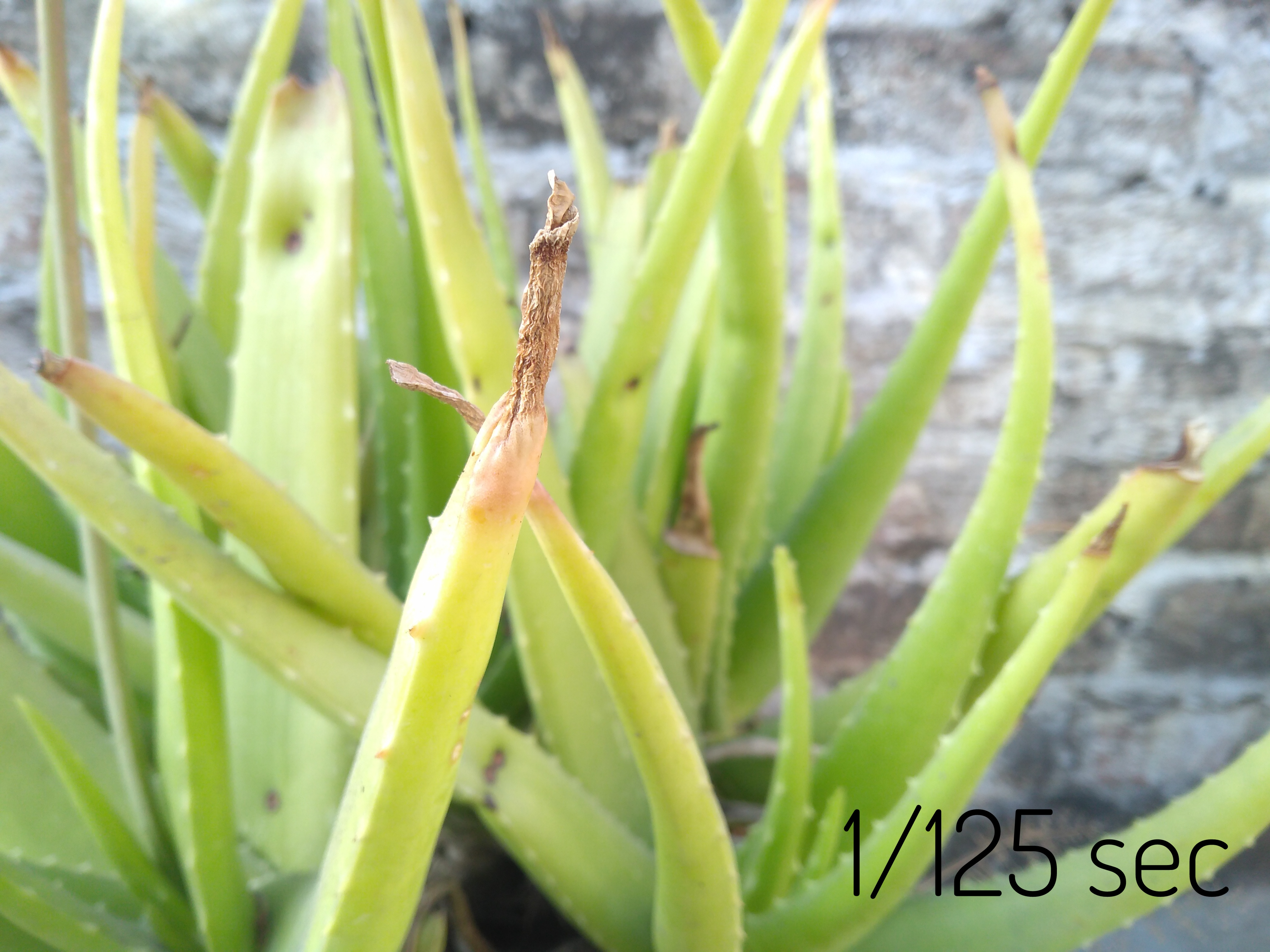
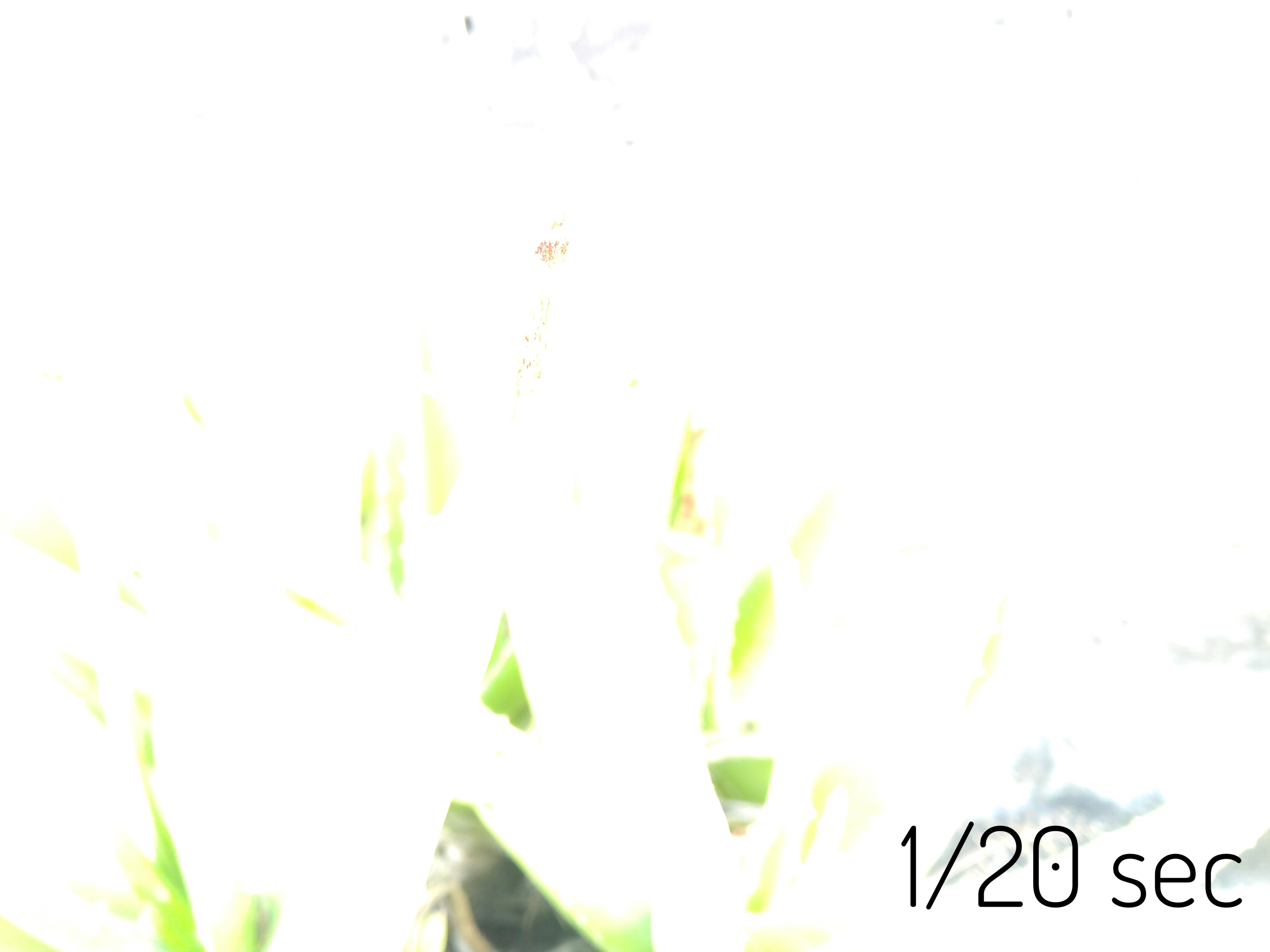
Photographic image taken using a variety of exposures

In photography, exposure is the amount of light per unit area reaching a frame of photographic film or the surface of an electronic image sensor. It is determined by exposure time, lens f-number, and scene luminance. Exposure is measured in units of lux-seconds (symbol lx⋅s), and can be computed from exposure value (EV) and scene luminance in a specified region.

An "exposure" is a single shutter cycle. For example, a long exposure refers to a single, long shutter cycle to gather enough dim light, whereas a multiple exposure involves a series of shutter cycles, effectively layering a series of photographs in one image. The accumulated photometric exposure (H_{v}) is the same so long as the total exposure time is the same.

== Definitions ==
=== Radiant exposure ===
Radiant exposure of a surface, denoted H_{e} ("e" for "energetic", to avoid confusion with photometric quantities) and measured in J/m^{2}, is given by
$$H_\mathrm{e} = E_\mathrm{e}t,$$
where

- E_{e} is the irradiance of the surface, measured in watts per square-meter, W/m^{2};
- t is the exposure duration, measured in seconds.

=== Luminous exposure ===
Luminous exposure of a surface, denoted H_{v} ('v' for 'visual', to avoid confusion with radiometric quantities) and measured in lux-seconds, is given by|
$$H_\mathrm{v} = E_\mathrm{v}t,$$
where

- E_{v} is the illuminance of the surface, measured in lux; and
- t is the exposure duration, measured in seconds.

If the measurement is adjusted to account only for light that reacts with the photo-sensitive surface, that is, weighted by the appropriate spectral sensitivity, the exposure is still measured in radiometric units (joules per square meter), rather than photometric units (weighted by the nominal sensitivity of the human eye). Only in this appropriately weighted case does the H measure the effective amount of light falling on the film, such that the characteristic curve will be correct independent of the spectrum of the light.

Many photographic materials are also sensitive to "invisible" light, which can be a nuisance, or a benefit. The use of radiometric units is appropriate to characterize such sensitivity to invisible light.

In sensitometric data, such as characteristic curves, the log exposure is conventionally expressed as log_{10}(H). Photographers more familiar with base-2 logarithmic scales (such as exposure values) can convert using log_{2}(H) ≈ 3.32 log_{10}(H).

Table 1. SI radiometry units
Quantity		Unit		Dimension	Notes
Name	Symbol (Note: Standards organizations recommend that radiometric quantities should be denoted with suffix "e" (for "energetic") to avoid confusion with photometric or photon quantities.)	Name	Symbol	Dimension	Notes
Radiant energy	Q_{e} (Note: Alternative symbols sometimes seen: W or E for radiant energy, P or F for radiant flux, I for irradiance, W for radiant exitance.)	joule	J	M⋅L^{2}⋅T^{−2}	Energy of electromagnetic radiation.
Radiant energy density	w_{e}	joule per cubic metre	J/m^{3}	M⋅L^{−1}⋅T^{−2}	Radiant energy per unit volume.
Radiant flux	Φ_{e}	watt	W = J/s	M⋅L^{2}⋅T^{−3}	Radiant energy emitted, reflected, transmitted or received, per unit time. This is sometimes also called "radiant power", and called luminosity in astronomy.
Spectral flux	Φ_{e,ν} (Note: Spectral quantities given per unit frequency are denoted with suffix "ν" (Greek letter nu, not to be confused with a letter "v", indicating a photometric quantity.))	watt per hertz	W/Hz	M⋅L^{2}⋅T^{−2}	Radiant flux per unit frequency or wavelength. The latter is commonly measured in W⋅nm^{−1}.
Spectral flux	Φ_{e,λ} (Note: Spectral quantities given per unit wavelength are denoted with suffix "λ".)	watt per metre	W/m	M⋅L⋅T^{−3}	Radiant flux per unit frequency or wavelength. The latter is commonly measured in W⋅nm^{−1}.
Radiant intensity	I_{e,Ω} (Note: Directional quantities are denoted with suffix "Ω".)	watt per steradian	W/sr	M⋅L^{2}⋅T^{−3}	Radiant flux emitted, reflected, transmitted or received, per unit solid angle. This is a directional quantity.
Spectral intensity	I_{e,Ω,ν}	watt per steradian per hertz	W⋅sr^{−1}⋅Hz^{−1}	M⋅L^{2}⋅T^{−2}	Radiant intensity per unit frequency or wavelength. The latter is commonly measured in W⋅sr^{−1}⋅nm^{−1}. This is a directional quantity.
Spectral intensity	I_{e,Ω,λ}	watt per steradian per metre	W⋅sr^{−1}⋅m^{−1}	M⋅L⋅T^{−3}	Radiant intensity per unit frequency or wavelength. The latter is commonly measured in W⋅sr^{−1}⋅nm^{−1}. This is a directional quantity.
Radiance	L_{e,Ω}	watt per steradian per square metre	W⋅sr^{−1}⋅m^{−2}	M⋅T^{−3}	Radiant flux emitted, reflected, transmitted or received by a surface, per unit solid angle per unit projected area. This is a directional quantity. This is sometimes also called "intensity".
Spectral radiance Specific intensity	L_{e,Ω,ν}	watt per steradian per square metre per hertz	W⋅sr^{−1}⋅m^{−2}⋅Hz^{−1}	M⋅T^{−2}	Radiance of a surface per unit frequency or wavelength. The latter is commonly measured in W⋅sr^{−1}⋅m^{−2}⋅nm^{−1}. This is a directional quantity. This is sometimes also called "spectral intensity".
Spectral radiance Specific intensity	L_{e,Ω,λ}	watt per steradian per square metre, per metre	W⋅sr^{−1}⋅m^{−3}	M⋅L^{−1}⋅T^{−3}	Radiance of a surface per unit frequency or wavelength. The latter is commonly measured in W⋅sr^{−1}⋅m^{−2}⋅nm^{−1}. This is a directional quantity. This is sometimes also called "spectral intensity".
Irradiance Flux density	E_{e}	watt per square metre	W/m^{2}	M⋅T^{−3}	Radiant flux received by a surface per unit area. This is sometimes also called "intensity".
Spectral irradiance Spectral flux density	E_{e,ν}	watt per square metre per hertz	W⋅m^{−2}⋅Hz^{−1}	M⋅T^{−2}	Irradiance of a surface per unit frequency or wavelength. This is sometimes also called "spectral intensity". Non-SI units of spectral flux density include jansky (1 Jy = 10^{−26} W⋅m^{−2}⋅Hz^{−1}) and solar flux unit (1 sfu = 10^{−22} W⋅m^{−2}⋅Hz^{−1} = 10^{4} Jy).
Spectral irradiance Spectral flux density	E_{e,λ}	watt per square metre, per metre	W/m^{3}	M⋅L^{−1}⋅T^{−3}	Irradiance of a surface per unit frequency or wavelength. This is sometimes also called "spectral intensity". Non-SI units of spectral flux density include jansky (1 Jy = 10^{−26} W⋅m^{−2}⋅Hz^{−1}) and solar flux unit (1 sfu = 10^{−22} W⋅m^{−2}⋅Hz^{−1} = 10^{4} Jy).
Radiosity	J_{e}	watt per square metre	W/m^{2}	M⋅T^{−3}	Radiant flux leaving (emitted, reflected and transmitted by) a surface per unit area. This is sometimes also called "intensity".
Spectral radiosity	J_{e,ν}	watt per square metre per hertz	W⋅m^{−2}⋅Hz^{−1}	M⋅T^{−2}	Radiosity of a surface per unit frequency or wavelength. The latter is commonly measured in W⋅m^{−2}⋅nm^{−1}. This is sometimes also called "spectral intensity".
Spectral radiosity	J_{e,λ}	watt per square metre, per metre	W/m^{3}	M⋅L^{−1}⋅T^{−3}	Radiosity of a surface per unit frequency or wavelength. The latter is commonly measured in W⋅m^{−2}⋅nm^{−1}. This is sometimes also called "spectral intensity".
Radiant exitance	M_{e}	watt per square metre	W/m^{2}	M⋅T^{−3}	Radiant flux emitted by a surface per unit area. This is the emitted component of radiosity. "Radiant emittance" is an old term for this quantity. This is sometimes also called "intensity".
Spectral exitance	M_{e,ν}	watt per square metre per hertz	W⋅m^{−2}⋅Hz^{−1}	M⋅T^{−2}	Radiant exitance of a surface per unit frequency or wavelength. The latter is commonly measured in W⋅m^{−2}⋅nm^{−1}. "Spectral emittance" is an old term for this quantity. This is sometimes also called "spectral intensity".
Spectral exitance	M_{e,λ}	watt per square metre, per metre	W/m^{3}	M⋅L^{−1}⋅T^{−3}	Radiant exitance of a surface per unit frequency or wavelength. The latter is commonly measured in W⋅m^{−2}⋅nm^{−1}. "Spectral emittance" is an old term for this quantity. This is sometimes also called "spectral intensity".
Radiant exposure	H_{e}	joule per square metre	J/m^{2}	M⋅T^{−2}	Radiant energy received by a surface per unit area, or equivalently irradiance of a surface integrated over time of irradiation. This is sometimes also called "radiant fluence".
Spectral exposure	H_{e,ν}	joule per square metre per hertz	J⋅m^{−2}⋅Hz^{−1}	M⋅T^{−1}	Radiant exposure of a surface per unit frequency or wavelength. The latter is commonly measured in J⋅m^{−2}⋅nm^{−1}. This is sometimes also called "spectral fluence".
Spectral exposure	H_{e,λ}	joule per square metre, per metre	J/m^{3}	M⋅L^{−1}⋅T^{−2}	Radiant exposure of a surface per unit frequency or wavelength. The latter is commonly measured in J⋅m^{−2}⋅nm^{−1}. This is sometimes also called "spectral fluence".
See also: SI; Radiometry; Photometry|(Compare)

Table 2. SI photometry quantities
Quantity		Unit		Dimension (Note: The symbols in this column denote dimensions; "L", "T" and "J" are for length, time, and luminous intensity respectively, not the symbols for the units litre, tesla, and joule.)	Notes
Name	Symbol (Note: Standards organizations recommend that photometric quantities be denoted with a subscript "v" (for "visual") to avoid confusion with radiometric or photon quantities. For example: USA Standard Letter Symbols for Illuminating Engineering USAS Z7.1-1967, Y10.18-1967)	Name	Symbol	Dimension	Notes
Luminous energy	Q_{v} (Note: Alternative symbols sometimes seen: W for luminous energy, P or F for luminous flux, and ρ for luminous efficacy of a source.)	lumen second	lm⋅s	T⋅J	The lumen second is sometimes called the talbot.
Luminous flux, luminous power	Φ_{v}	lumen (= candela steradian)	lm (= cd⋅sr)	J	Luminous energy per unit time
Luminous intensity	I_{v}	candela (= lumen per steradian)	cd (= lm/sr)	J	Luminous flux per unit solid angle
Luminance	L_{v}	candela per square metre	cd/m^{2} (= lm/(sr⋅m^{2}))	L^{−2}⋅J	Luminous flux per unit solid angle per unit projected source area. The candela per square metre is sometimes called the nit.
Illuminance	E_{v}	lux (= lumen per square metre)	lx (= lm/m^{2})	L^{−2}⋅J	Luminous flux incident on a surface
Luminous exitance, luminous emittance	M_{v}	lumen per square metre	lm/m^{2}	L^{−2}⋅J	Luminous flux emitted from a surface
Luminous exposure	H_{v}	lux second	lx⋅s	L^{−2}⋅T⋅J	Time-integrated illuminance
Luminous energy density	ω_{v}	lumen second per cubic metre	lm⋅s/m^{3}	L^{−3}⋅T⋅J	
Luminous efficacy (of radiation)	K	lumen per watt	lm/W	M^{−1}⋅L^{−2}⋅T^{3}⋅J	Ratio of luminous flux to radiant flux
Luminous efficacy (of a source)	η	lumen per watt	lm/W	M^{−1}⋅L^{−2}⋅T^{3}⋅J	Ratio of luminous flux to power consumption
Luminous efficiency, luminous coefficient	V			1	Luminous efficacy normalized by the maximum possible efficacy
See also: SI; Photometry; Radiometry|(Compare)

== Optimum exposure ==
So-called "correct" exposure may be defined as an exposure that achieves the effect the photographer intended.

A more technical approach recognises that a photographic film (or sensor) has a physically limited useful exposure range, sometimes called its dynamic range. If, for any part of the photograph, the actual exposure is outside this range, the film cannot record it accurately. In a very simple model, for example, out-of-range values would be recorded as "black" (underexposed) or "white" (overexposed) rather than the precisely graduated shades of colour and tone required to describe "detail". Therefore, the purpose of exposure adjustment (and/or lighting adjustment) is to control the physical amount of light from the subject that is allowed to fall on the film, so that 'significant' areas of shadow and highlight detail do not exceed the film's useful exposure range. This ensures that no 'significant' information is lost during capture.

The photographer may carefully overexpose or underexpose the photograph to eliminate what they judge as insignificant or unwanted detail; to make, for example, a white altar cloth appear immaculately clean, or to emulate the heavy, pitiless shadows of film noir. However, it is technically much easier to discard recorded information during post processing than to try to 're-create' unrecorded information.

In a scene with strong or harsh lighting, the ratio between highlight and shadow luminance values may well be larger than the ratio between the film's maximum and minimum useful exposure values. In this case, adjusting the camera's exposure settings (which only applies changes to the whole image, not selectively to parts of the image) only allows the photographer to choose between underexposed shadows or overexposed highlights; it cannot bring both into the useful exposure range at the same time. Methods for dealing with this situation include: using what is called fill lighting to increase the illumination in shadow areas; using a graduated neutral-density filter, flag, scrim, or gobo to reduce the illumination falling upon areas deemed too bright; or varying the exposure between multiple, otherwise identical, photographs (exposure bracketing) and then combining them afterwards in an HDRI process.

=== Overexposure and underexposure ===
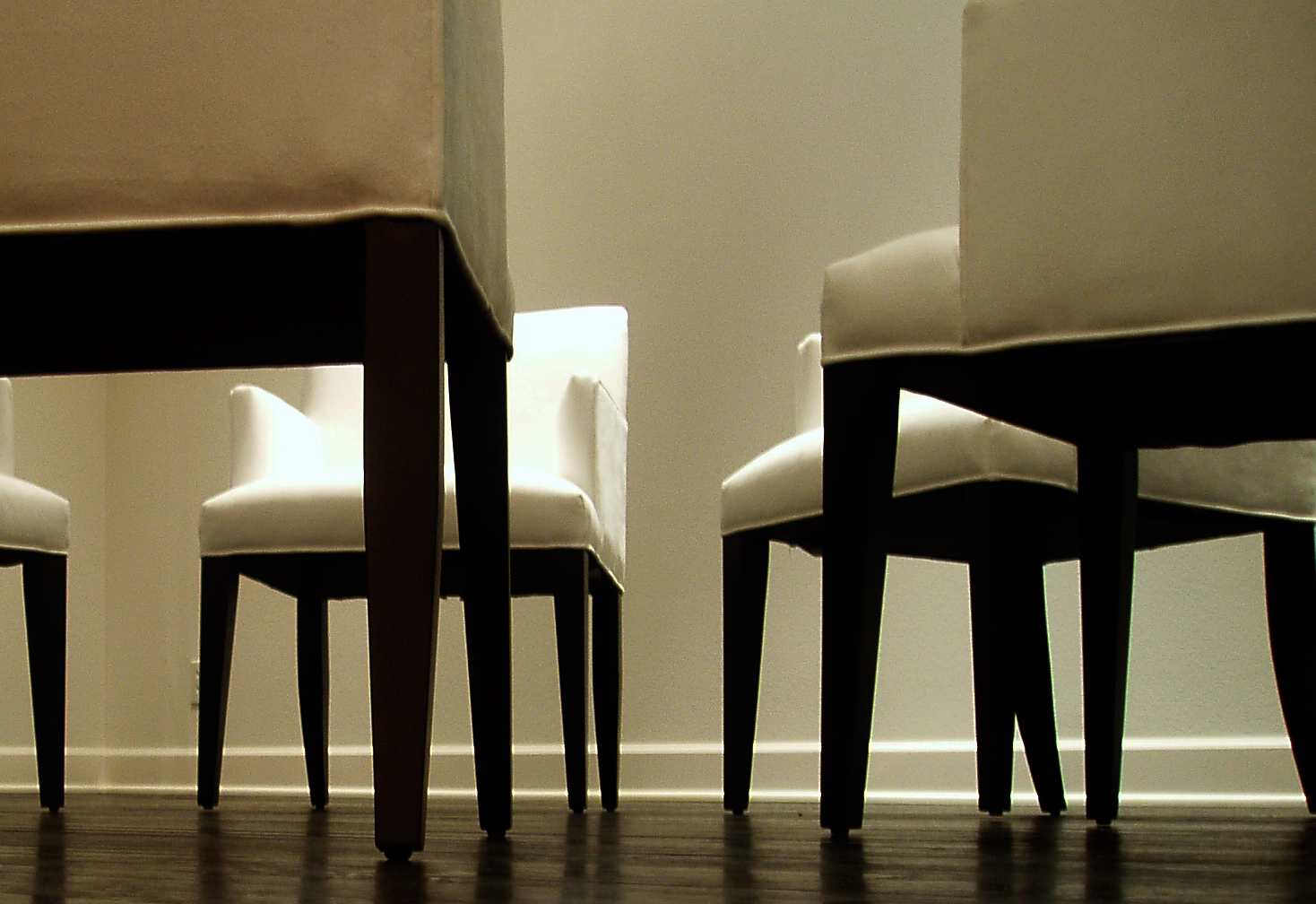
White chair: Deliberate use of overexposure for aesthetic purposes

A photograph may be described as overexposed when it has a loss of highlight detail, that is, when important bright parts of an image are "washed out" or effectively all white, known as "blown-out highlights" or "clipped whites". A photograph may be described as underexposed when it has a loss of shadow detail, that is, when important dark areas are "muddy" or indistinguishable from black, known as "blocked-up shadows" (or sometimes "crushed shadows", "crushed blacks", or "clipped blacks", especially in video). As the adjacent image shows, these terms are technical ones rather than artistic judgments; an overexposed or underexposed image may be "correct" in the sense that it provides the effect that the photographer intended. Intentionally over- or underexposing (relative to a standard or the camera's automatic exposure) is casually referred to as "exposing to the right" or "exposing to the left" respectively, as these shift the histogram of the image to the right or left.

== Exposure settings ==
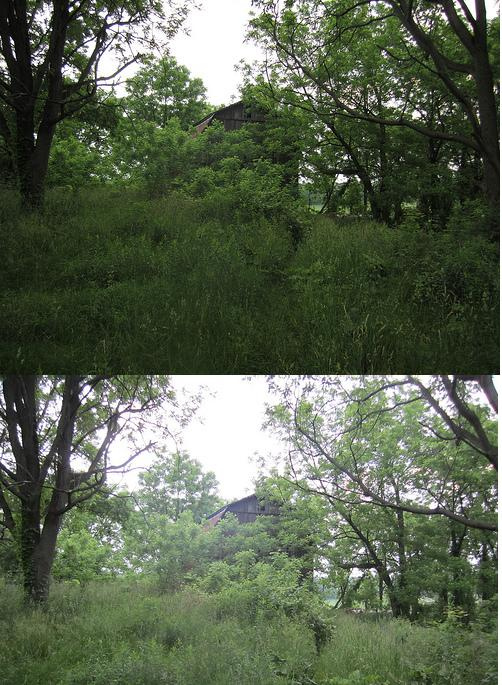
Two similar images, one taken in auto mode (underexposed), the other with manual settings

=== Manual exposure ===
In manual mode, the photographer adjusts the lens aperture and/or shutter speed to achieve the desired exposure. Many photographers choose to control aperture and shutter independently because opening up the aperture increases exposure, but also decreases the depth of field, and a slower shutter increases exposure but also increases the opportunity for motion blur.

"Manual" exposure calculations may be based on some method of light metering with a working knowledge of exposure values, the APEX system and/or the Zone System.

=== Automatic exposure ===
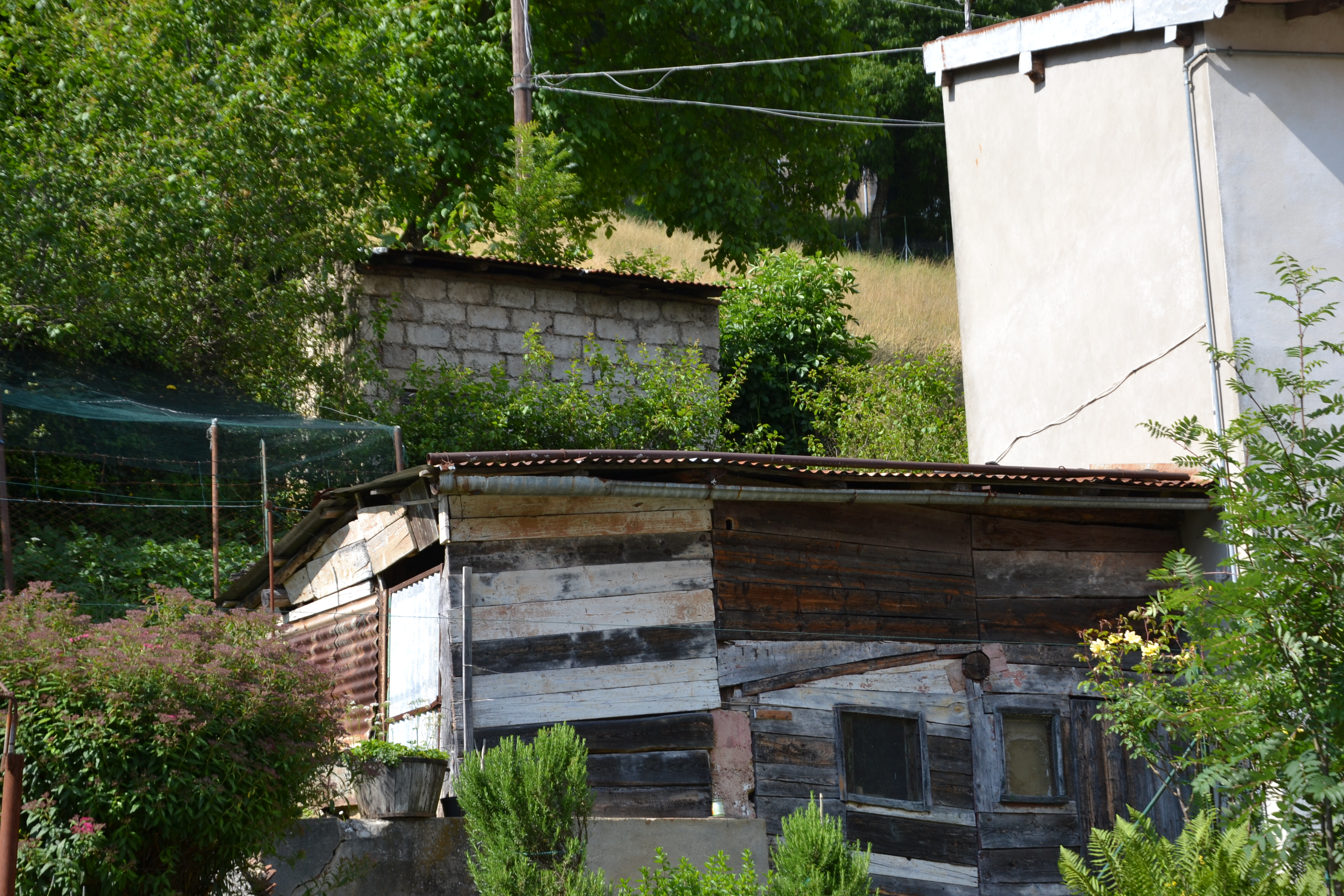
Buildings and trees photographed with an autoexposure time of 1/200 s

A camera in automatic exposure or autoexposure (usually initialized as AE) mode automatically calculates and adjusts exposure settings to match (as closely as possible) the subject's mid-tone to the mid-tone of the photograph. For most cameras, this means using an on-board TTL exposure meter.

Aperture priority (commonly abbreviated as A, or Av for "aperture value") mode gives the photographer manual control of the aperture, whilst the camera automatically adjusts the shutter speed to achieve the exposure specified by the TTL meter. Shutter priority (often abbreviated as S, or Tv for "time value") mode gives manual shutter control, with automatic aperture compensation. In each case, the actual exposure level is still determined by the camera's exposure meter.

=== Exposure compensation ===
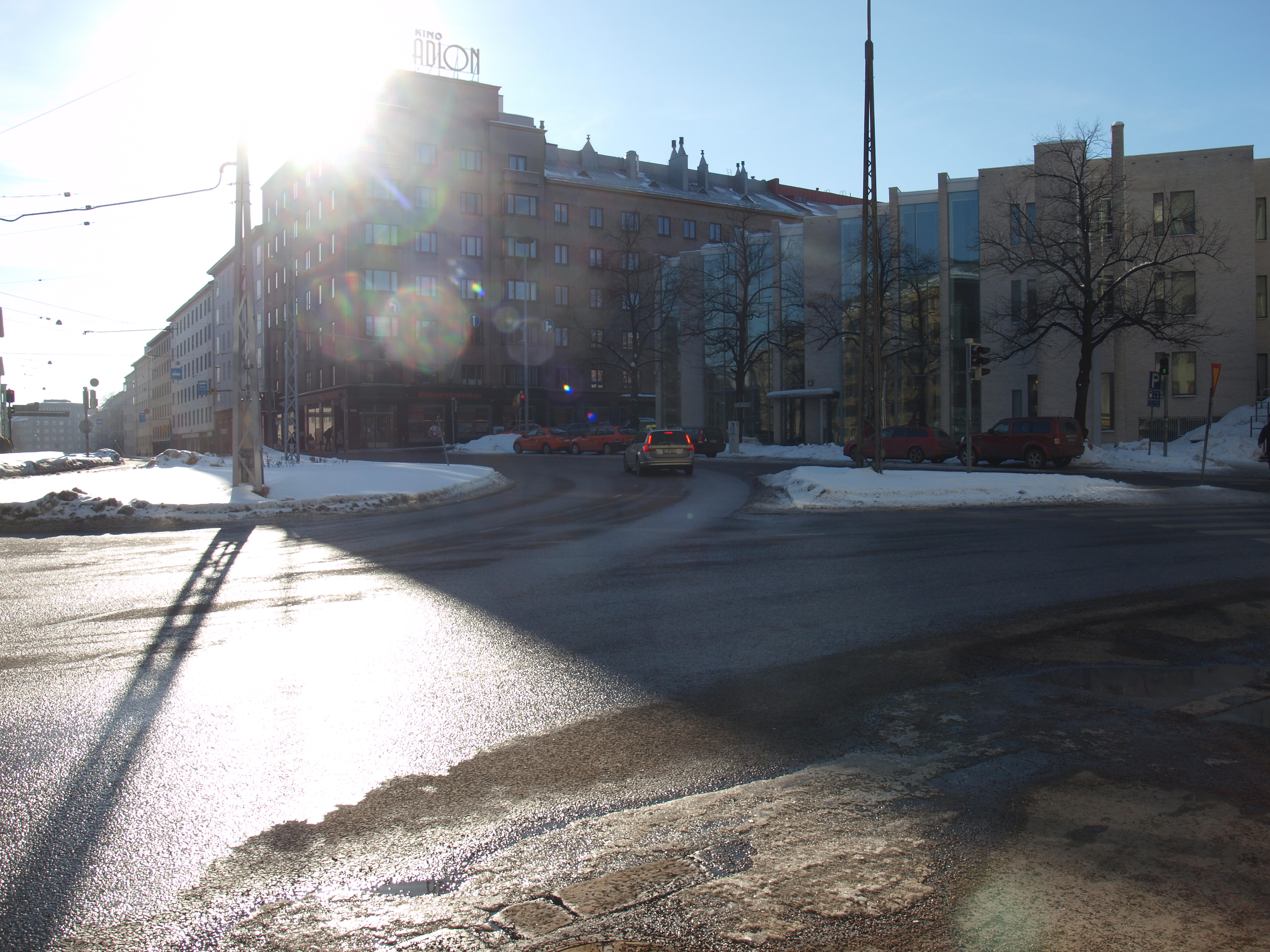
A street view of Taka-Töölö, Helsinki, Finland, during a very sunny winter day. The image has been deliberately overexposed by +1 EV to compensate for the bright sunlight and the exposure time calculated by the camera's program automatic metering is still 1/320 s.

The purpose of an exposure meter is to estimate the subject's mid-tone luminance and indicate the camera exposure settings required to record this as a mid-tone. In order to do this it has to make a number of assumptions which, under certain circumstances, will be wrong. If the exposure setting indicated by an exposure meter is taken as the "reference" exposure, the photographer may wish to deliberately overexpose or underexpose in order to compensate for known or anticipated metering inaccuracies.

Cameras with any kind of internal exposure meter usually feature an exposure compensation setting which is intended to allow the photographer to simply offset the exposure level from the internal meter's estimate of appropriate exposure. Frequently calibrated in stops, also known as EV units, a "+1" exposure compensation setting indicates one stop more (twice as much) exposure and "−1" means one stop less (half as much) exposure.

Exposure compensation is particularly useful in combination with auto-exposure mode, as it allows the photographer to bias the exposure level without resorting to full manual exposure and losing the flexibility of auto exposure. On low-end video camcorders, exposure compensation may be the only manual exposure control available.

== Exposure control ==
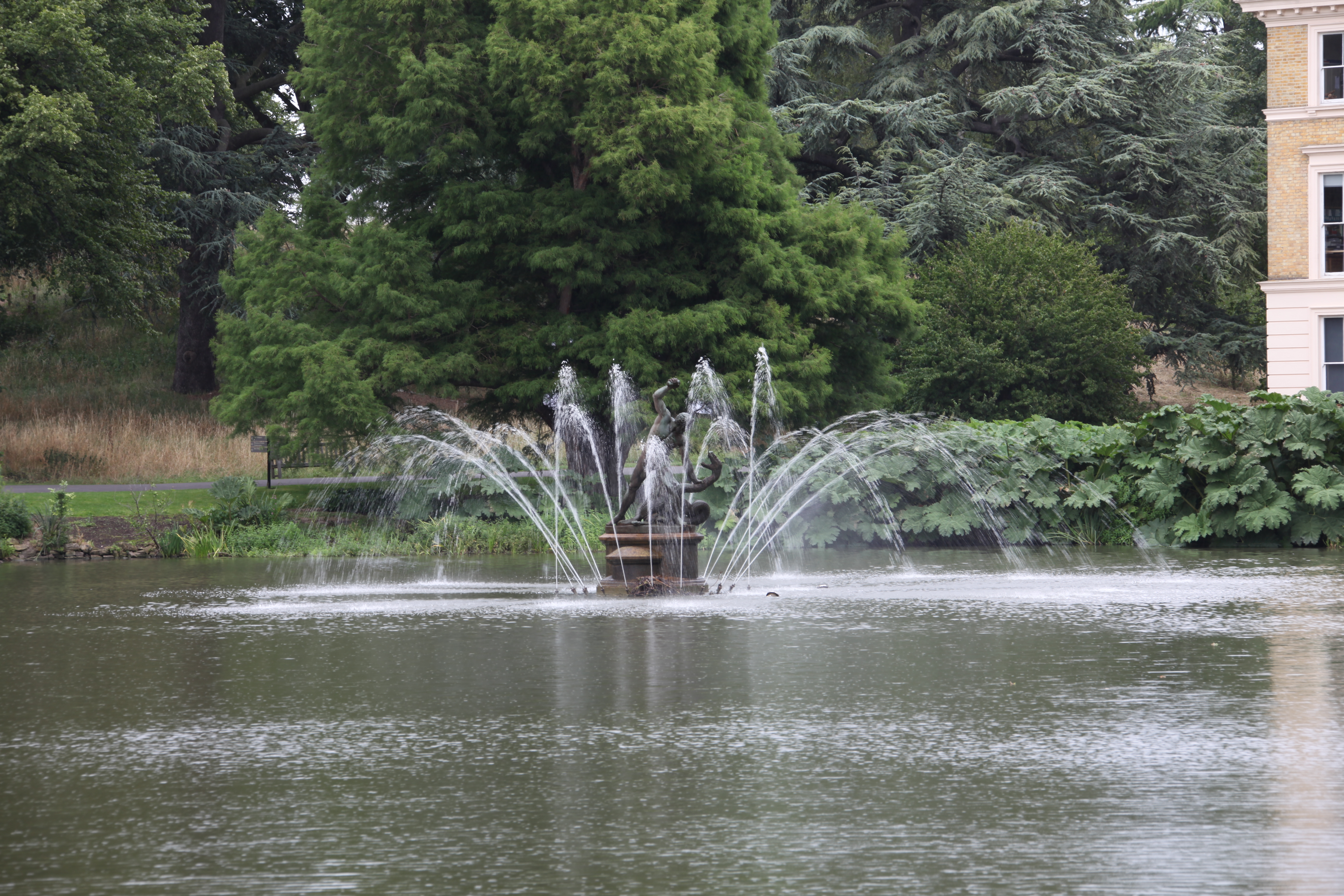
A 1/30 s exposure showing motion blur on fountain at Royal Botanic Gardens, Kew

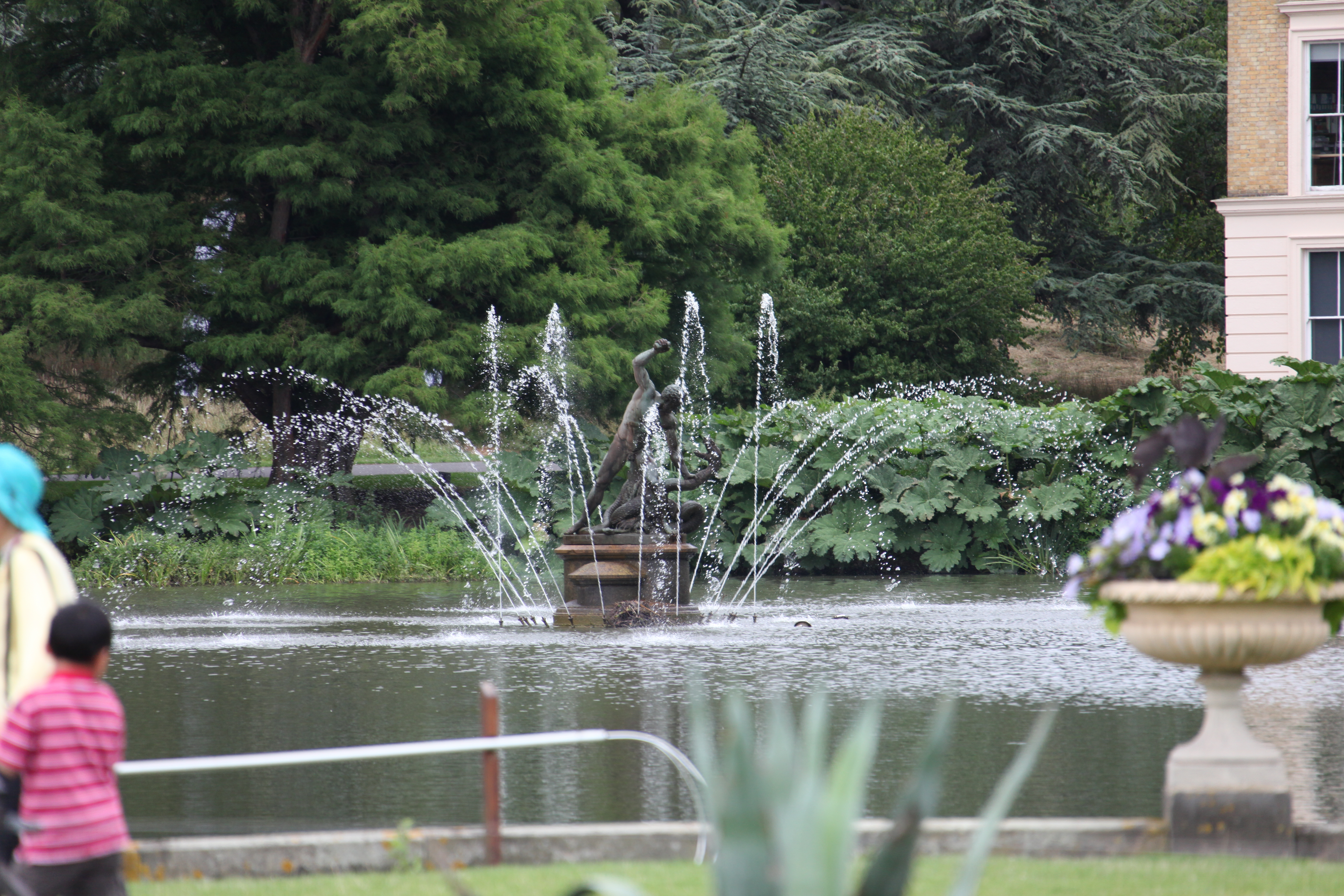
A 1/320 s exposure showing individual drops on fountain at Royal Botanic Gardens, Kew

An appropriate exposure for a photograph is determined by the sensitivity of the medium used. For photographic film, sensitivity is referred to as film speed and is measured on a scale published by the International Organization for Standardization (ISO). Faster film, that is, film with a higher ISO rating, requires less exposure to make a readable image. Digital cameras usually have variable ISO settings that provide additional flexibility. Exposure is a combination of the length of time and the illuminance at the photosensitive material. Exposure time is controlled in a camera by shutter speed, and the illuminance depends on the lens aperture and the scene luminance. Slower shutter speeds (exposing the medium for a longer period of time), greater lens apertures (admitting more light), and higher-luminance scenes produce greater exposures.

An approximately correct exposure will be obtained on a sunny day using ISO 100 film, an aperture of f/16 and a shutter speed of 1/100 of a second. This is called the sunny 16 rule: at an aperture of f/16 on a sunny day, a suitable shutter speed will be one over the film speed (or closest equivalent).

A scene can be exposed in many ways, depending on the desired effect a photographer wishes to convey.

== Reciprocity ==
An important principle of exposure is reciprocity. If one exposes the film or sensor for a longer period, a reciprocally smaller aperture is required to reduce the amount of light hitting the film to obtain the same exposure. For example, the photographer may prefer to make their sunny-16 shot at an aperture of f/5.6 (to obtain a shallow depth of field). As f/5.6 is 3 stops "faster" than f/16, with each stop meaning double the amount of light, a new shutter speed of (1/125)/(2·2·2) = 1/1000 s is needed. Once the photographer has determined the exposure, aperture stops can be traded for halvings or doublings of speed, within limits.

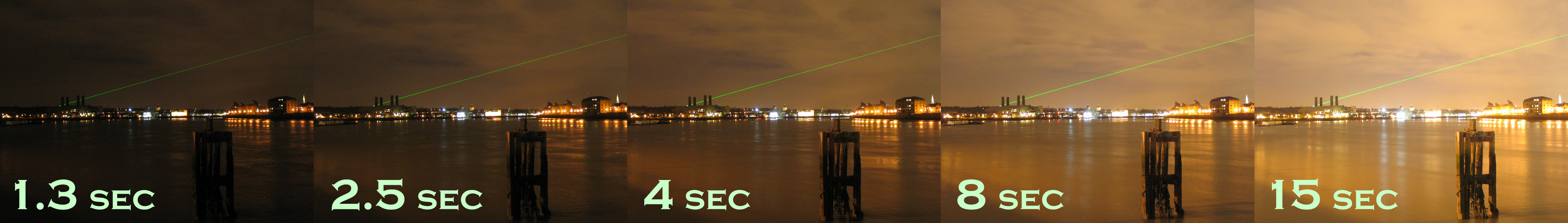
A demonstration of the effect of exposure in night photography. Longer shutter speeds result in increased exposure.

The true characteristic of most photographic emulsions is not actually linear (see sensitometry), but it is close enough over the exposure range of about 1 second to 1/1000 of a second. Outside of this range, it becomes necessary to increase the exposure from the calculated value to account for this characteristic of the emulsion. This characteristic is known as reciprocity failure. The film manufacturer's data sheets should be consulted to arrive at the correction required, as different emulsions have different characteristics.

Digital camera image sensors can also be subject to a form of reciprocity failure.

== Determining exposure ==
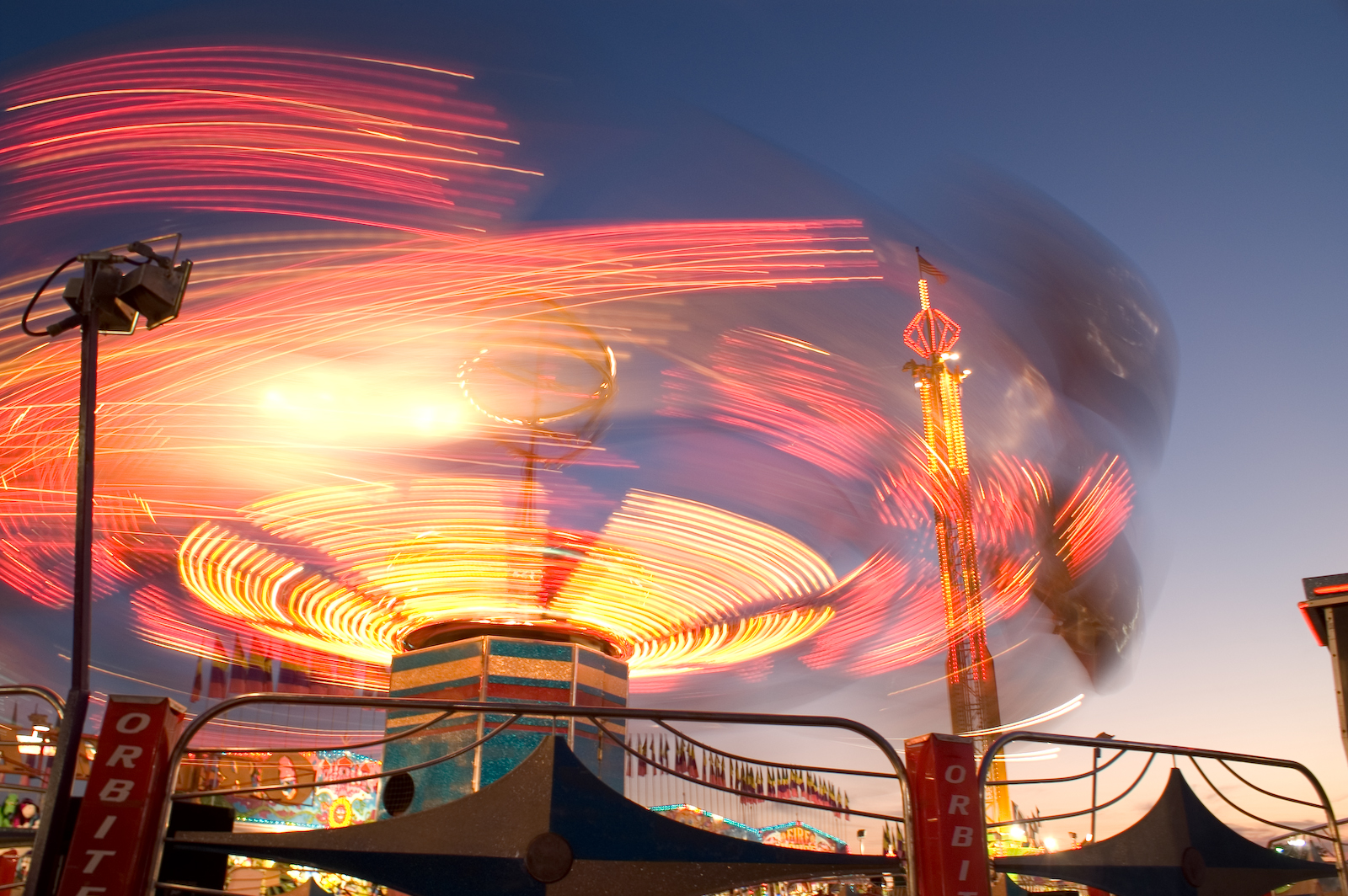
A fair ride taken with a 1/3 s exposure

The Zone System is another method of determining exposure and development combinations to achieve a greater tonality range over conventional methods by varying the contrast of the film to fit the print contrast capability. Digital cameras can achieve similar results (high dynamic range) by combining several different exposures (varying shutter or diaphragm) made in quick succession.

Today, most cameras automatically determine the correct exposure at the time of taking a photograph by using a built-in light meter, or multiple point meters interpreted by a built-in computer, see metering mode.

Negative and print film tends to bias for exposing for the shadow areas (film dislikes being starved of light), with digital favouring exposure for highlights. See latitude below.

== Latitude ==
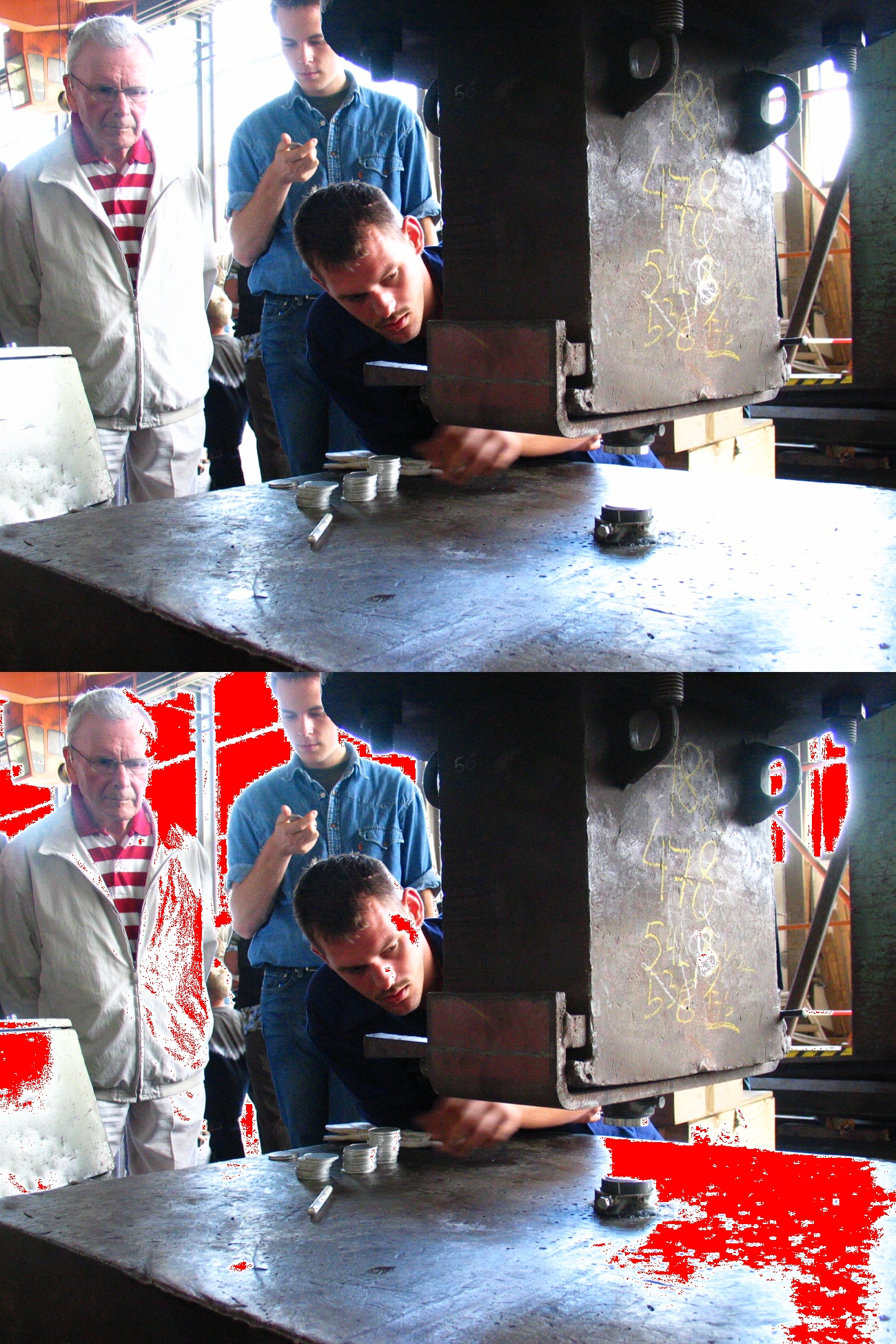
Example image exhibiting blown-out highlights. Top: original image, bottom: blown-out areas marked red

Latitude is the degree by which one can over, or under expose an image, and still recover an acceptable level of quality from an exposure. Typically negative film has a better ability to record a range of brightness than slide/transparency film or digital. Digital should be considered to be the reverse of print film, with a good latitude in the shadow range, and a narrow one in the highlight area; in contrast to film's large highlight latitude, and narrow shadow latitude. Slide/Transparency film has a narrow latitude in both highlight and shadow areas, requiring greater exposure accuracy.

Negative film's latitude increases somewhat with high ISO material, in contrast digital tends to narrow on latitude with high ISO settings.

=== Highlights ===
Areas of a photo where information is lost due to extreme brightness are described as having "blown-out highlights" or "flared highlights".

In digital images this information loss is often irreversible, though small problems can be made less noticeable using photo manipulation software. Recording to raw image format can correct this problem to some degree, as can using a digital camera with a better sensor.

Film can often have areas of extreme overexposure but still record detail in those areas. This information is usually somewhat recoverable when printing or transferring to digital.

A loss of highlights in a photograph is usually undesirable, but in some cases can be considered to "enhance" appeal. Examples include black and white photography and portraits with an out-of-focus background.

=== Blacks ===
Areas of a photo where information is lost due to extreme darkness are described as "crushed blacks". Digital capture tends to be more tolerant of underexposure, allowing better recovery of shadow detail, than same-ISO negative print film.

Crushed blacks cause loss of detail, but can be used for artistic effect.

== See also ==
- Bulb (photography)
- Exposure bracketing
- Exposure value
- Film speed
- Gray card
- Multi-exposure HDR capture
- Light painting
- Light value
- Night photography
- Multiple exposure
- Sensitometry (and Hurter–Driffield curves)
- Shutter speed (also called exposure time)
- Zebra patterning
