= Aperture value =

Aperture value may refer to:

- $A_v$ in the APEX system (Additive System of Photographic Exposure)
- Aperture value mode (Av mode), an aperture priority mode on electronically controlled cameras
- Aperture
- F-number
