= Light meter =

Device used to measure the amount of light

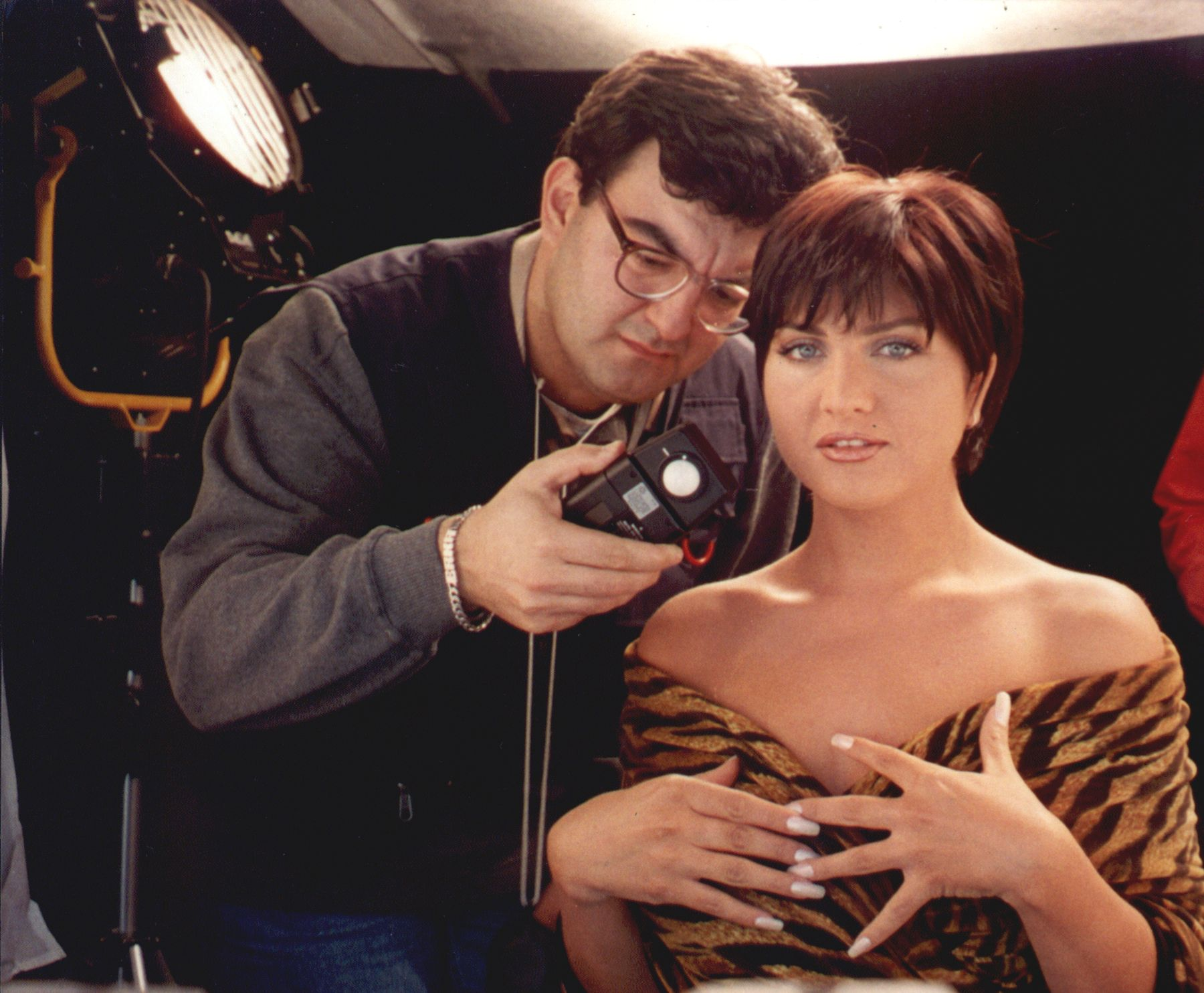
Use of a light meter for portrait cinematography in a Turkish music video set

A light meter (or illuminometer) is a device used to measure the amount of light. In photography, an exposure meter is a light meter coupled to either a digital or analog calculator which displays the correct shutter speed and f-number for optimum exposure, given a certain lighting situation and film speed. Similarly, exposure meters are also used in the fields of cinematography and scenic design, in order to determine the optimum light level for a scene.

Light meters also are used in the general field of architectural lighting design to verify proper installation and performance of a building lighting system, and in assessing the light levels for growing plants.

If a light meter is giving its indications in luxes, it is called a "luxmeter".

== Evolution ==
Photographic exposure meters

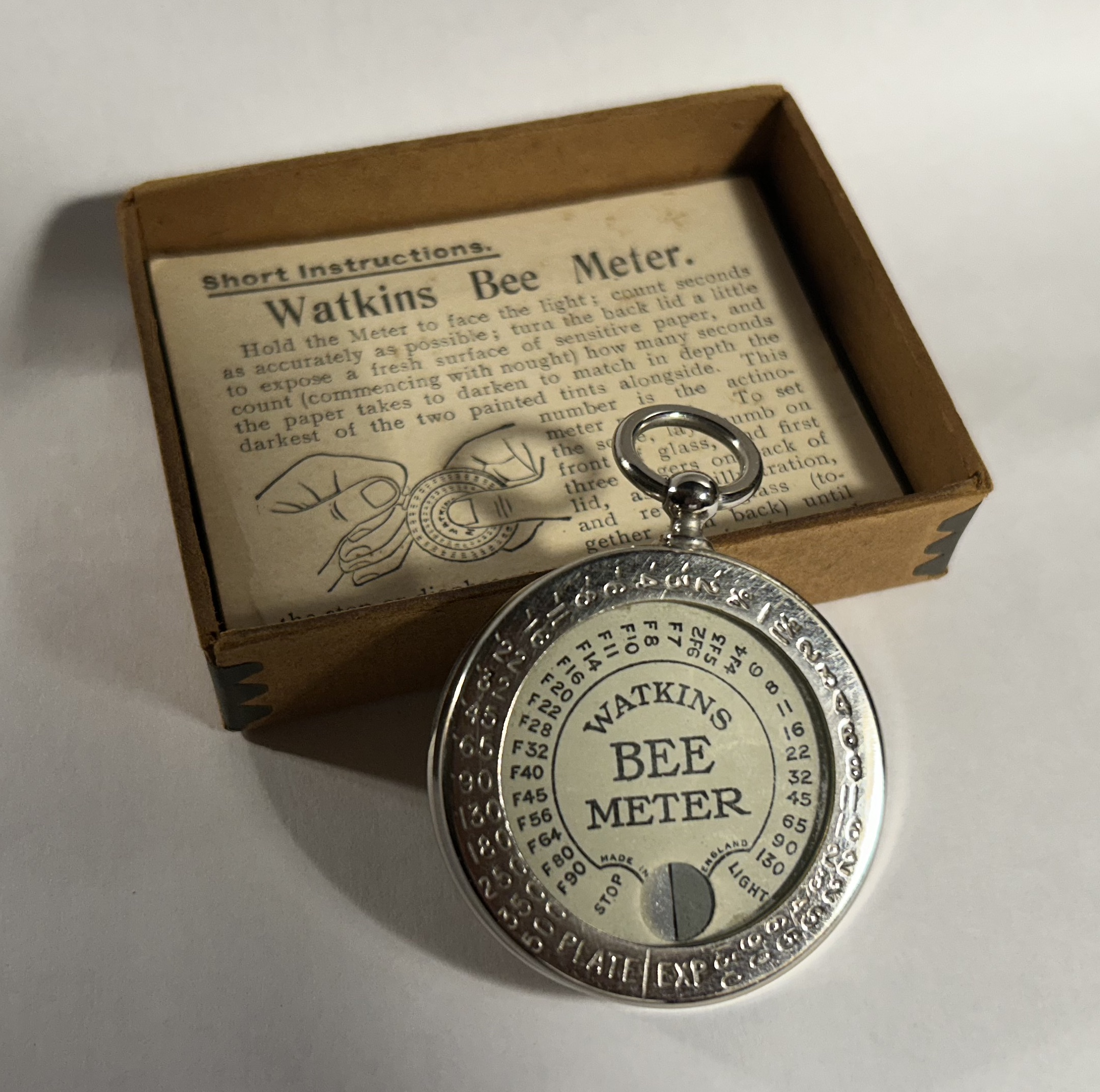
Watkins Bee Meter - a type of actinometer

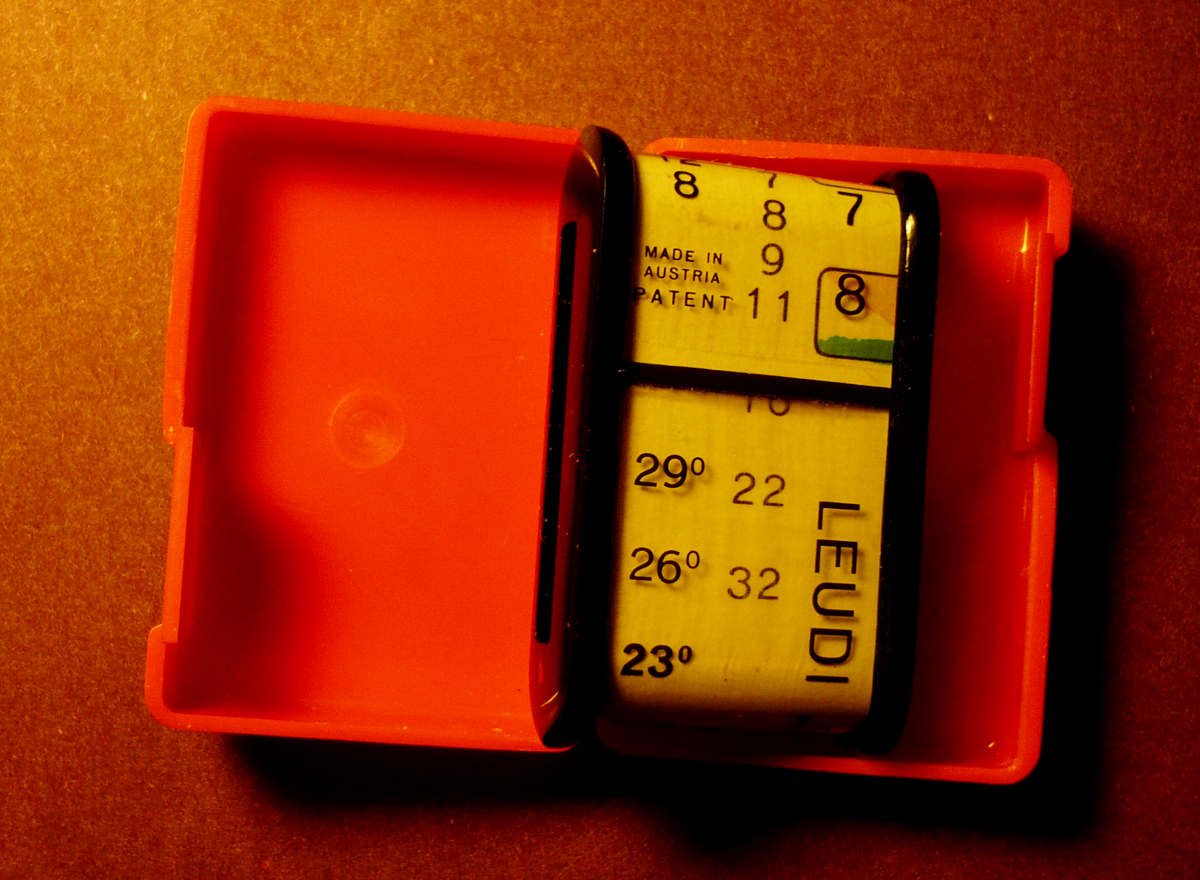
Leudi extinction meter

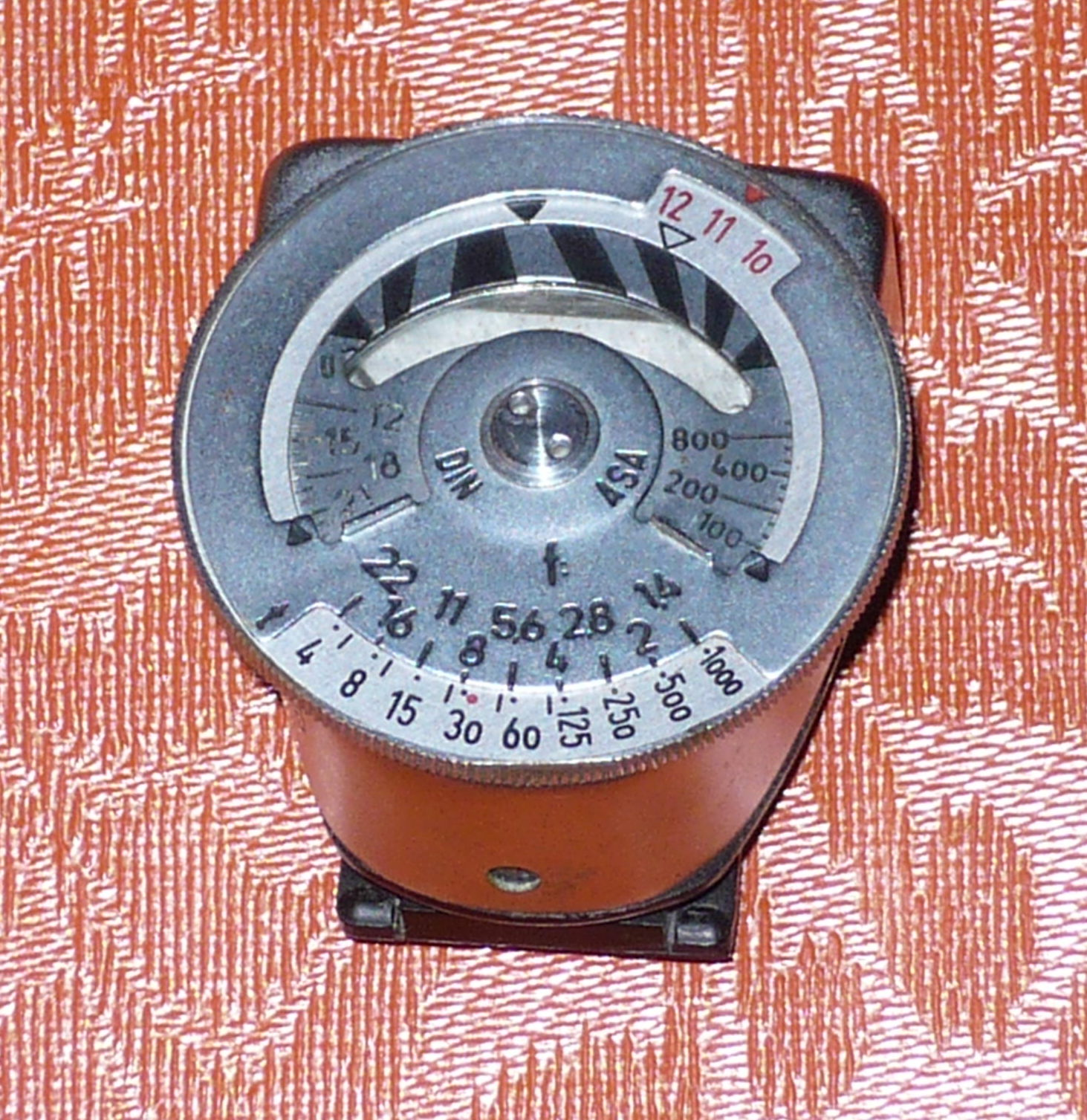
Metrophot

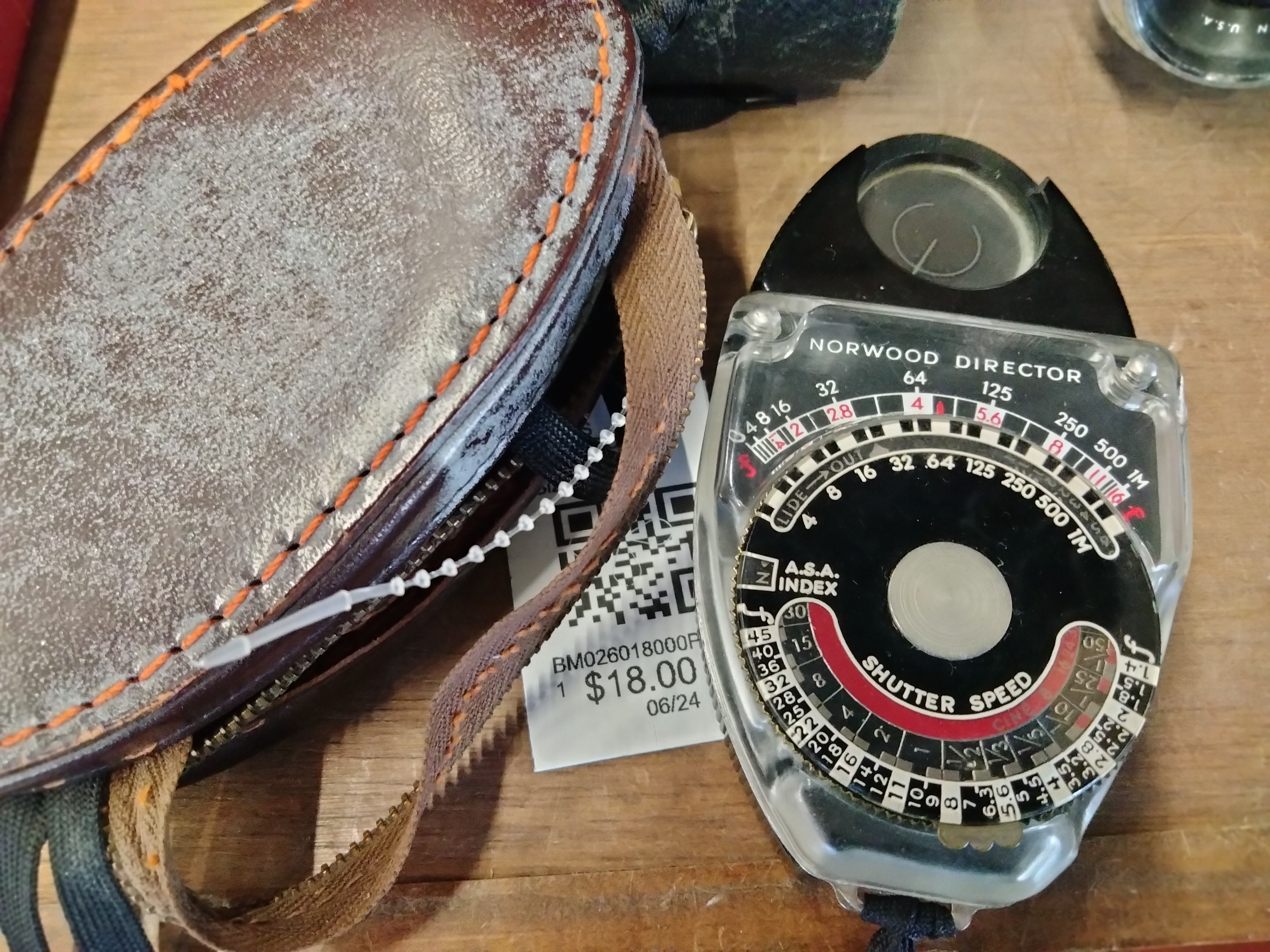
Norwood Director
Model No. 56646

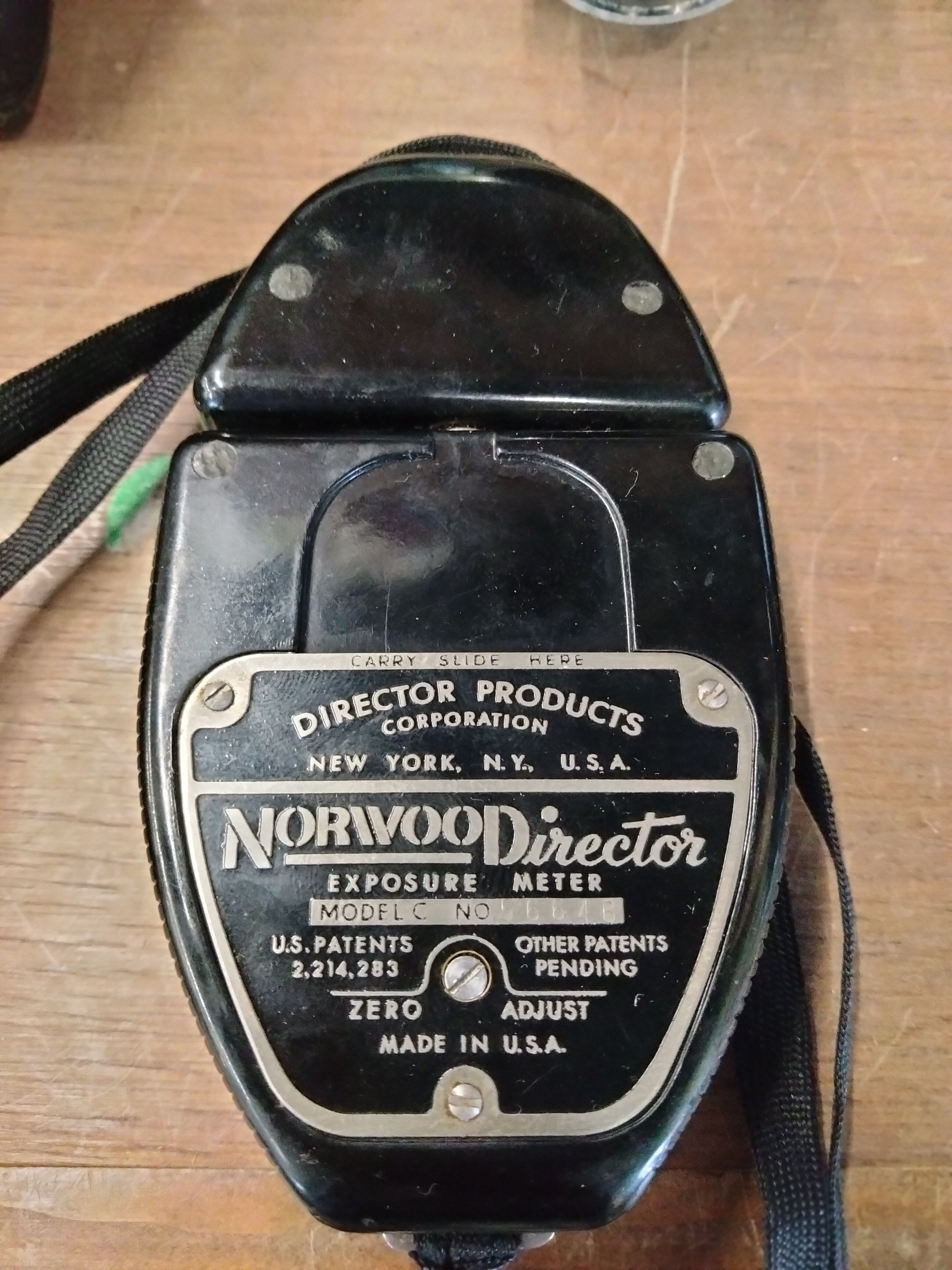
Norwood Director
Pat. 2,214,238

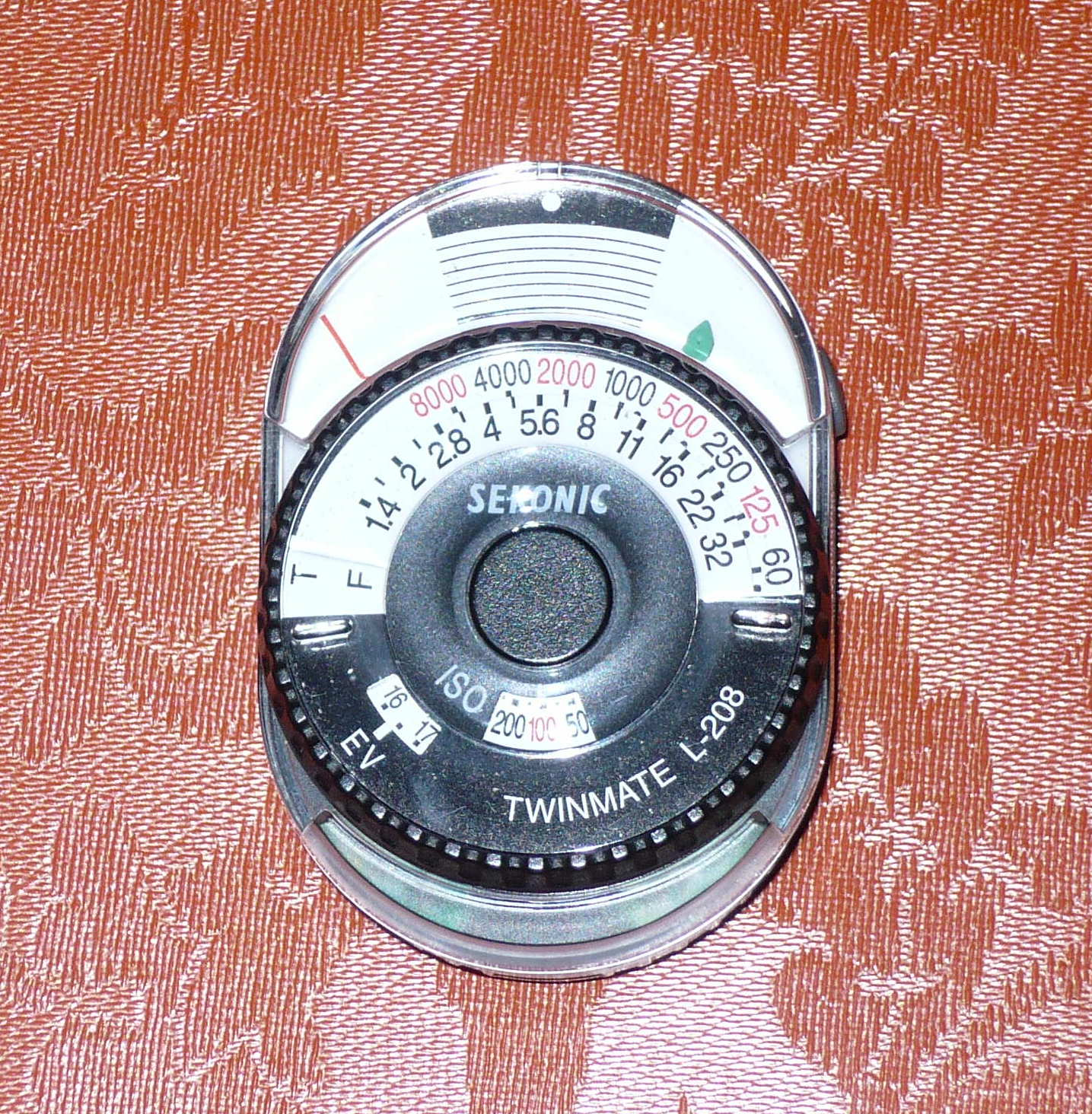
Sekonic "Twinmate" L208

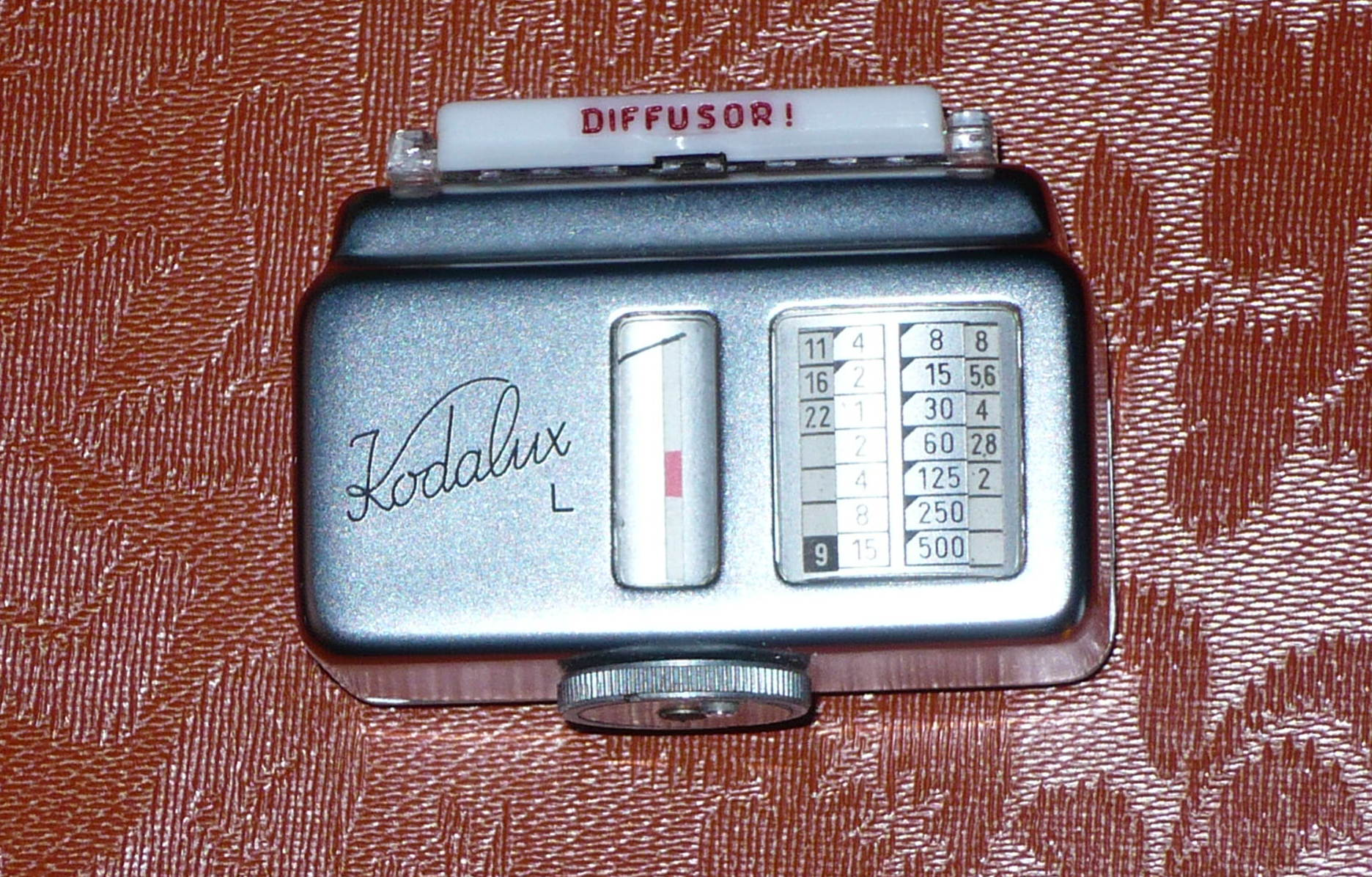
Kodalux

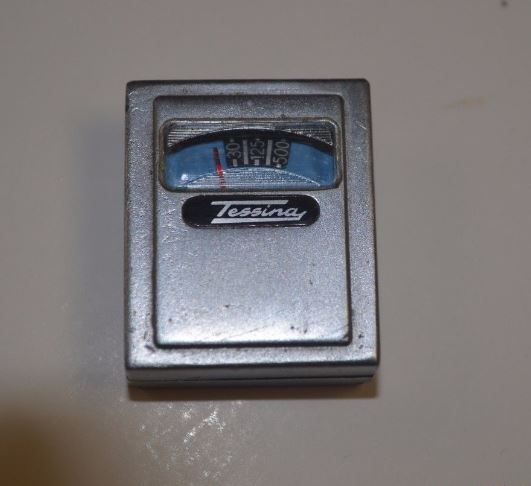
Tessina Meter

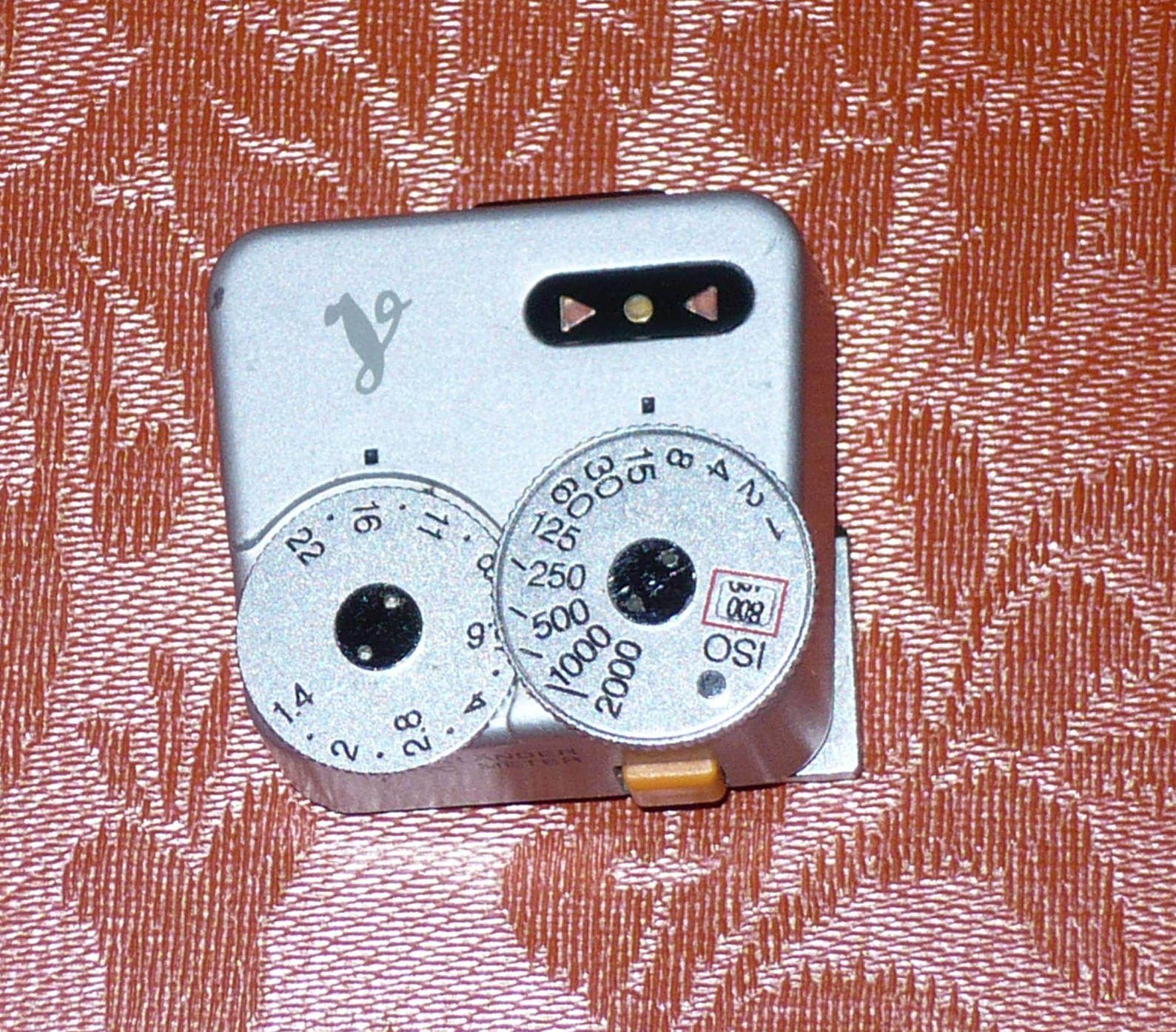
Voigtlander VC Meter

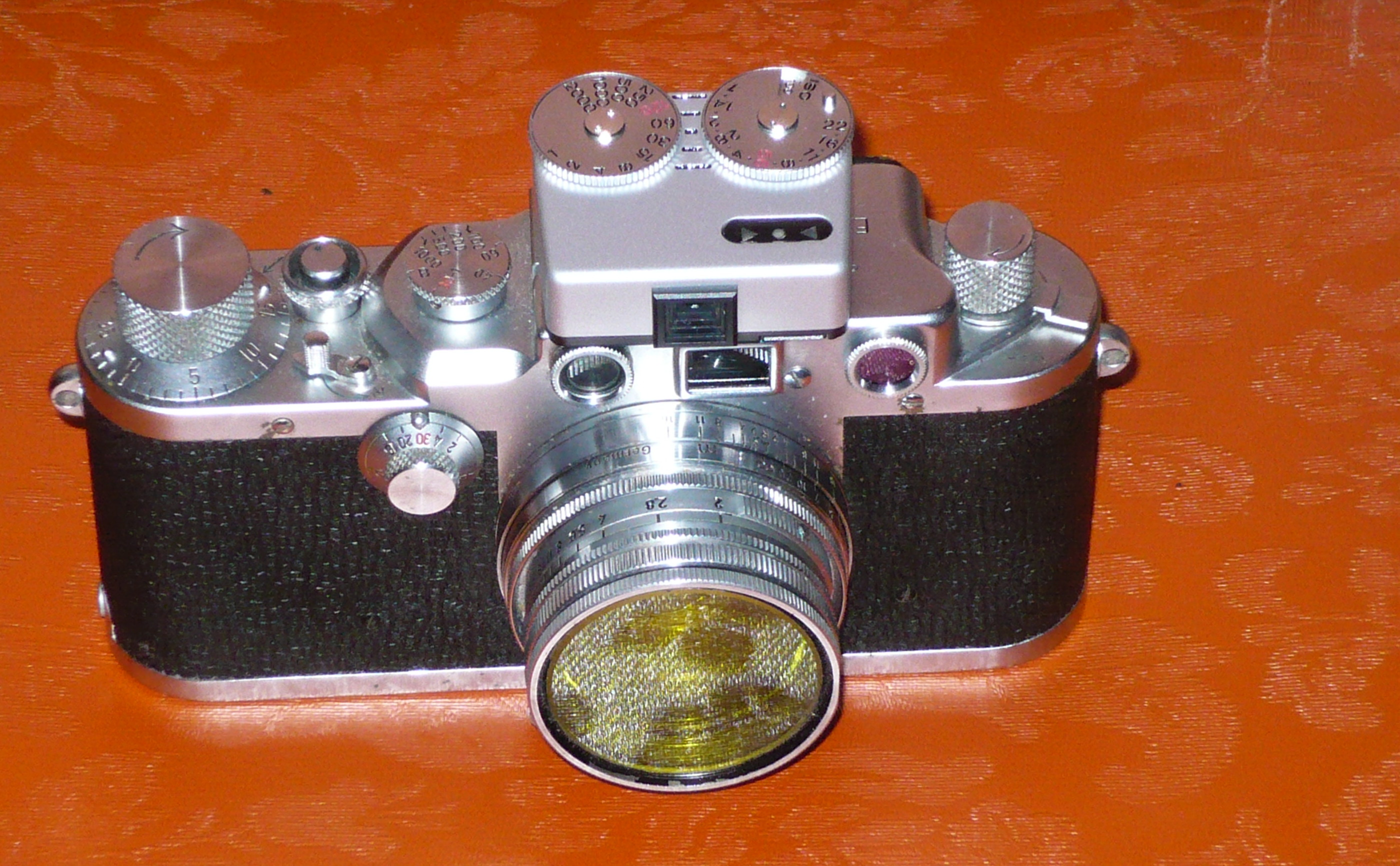
Leica IIIC with Voigtlander VC Meter II

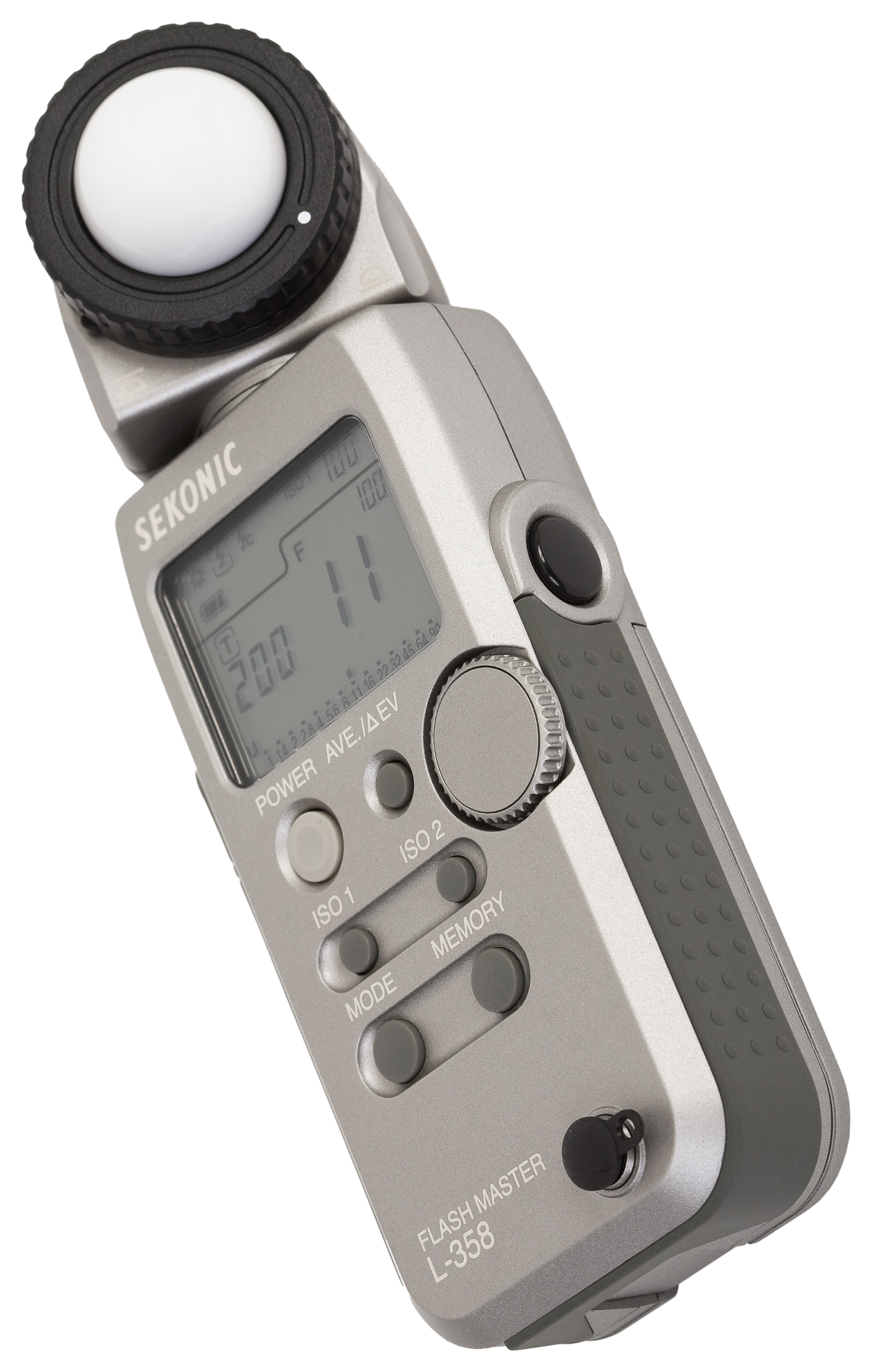
Sekonic L-358 "Flash Master"

=== Actinometers ===
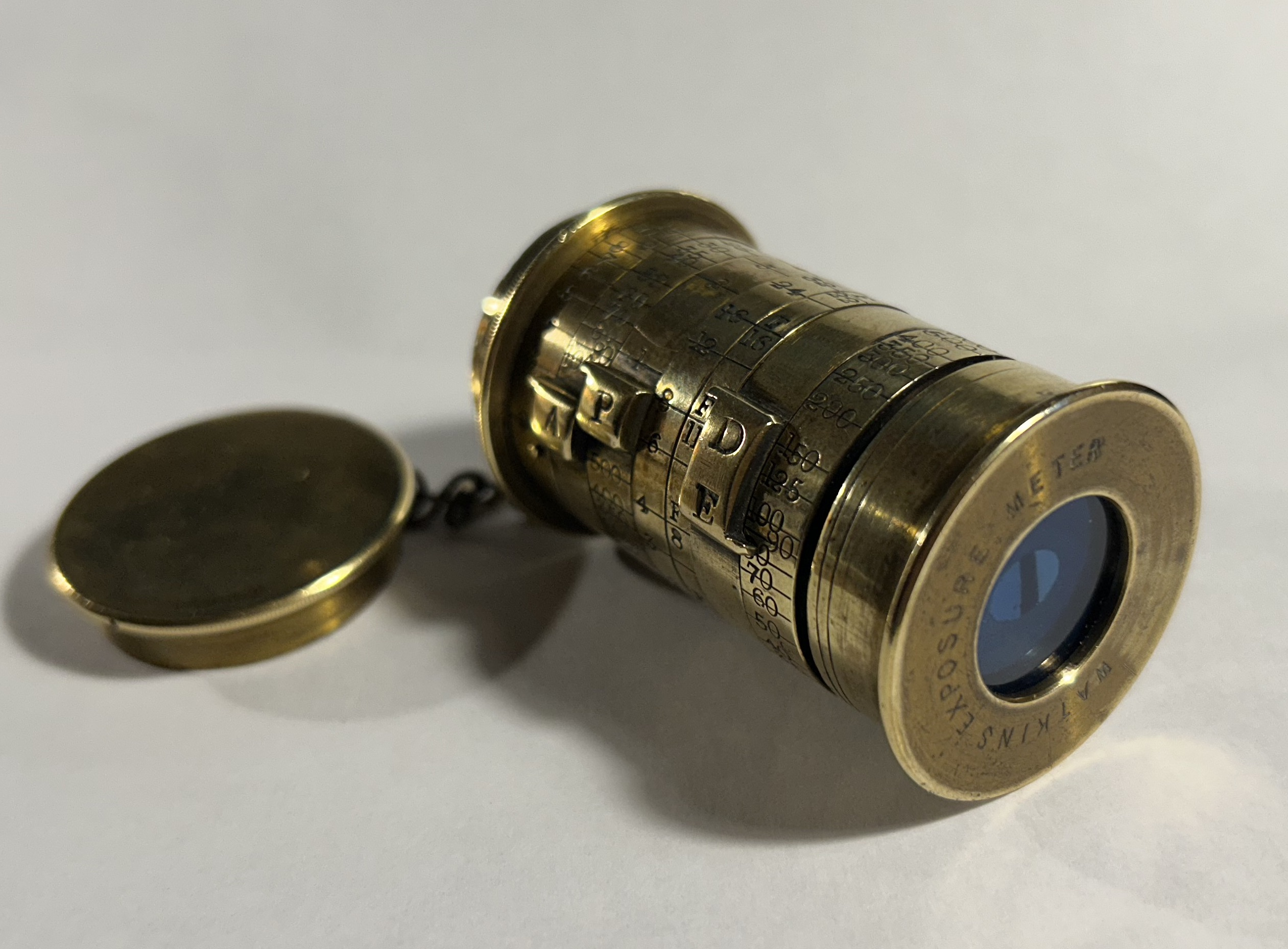
Watkins Standard Exposure Meter - a type of actinometer

The earliest exposure meters were called actinometers (not to be confused with the scientific instrument with the same name), described as early as 1840 but developed in the late 1800s after commercial photographic plates became available with consistent sensitivity. These photographic actinometers used light-sensitive paper; the photographer would measure the time required for the paper to darken to a control value, providing an input to a mechanical calculation of shutter speed and aperture for a given plate number. They were popular between approximately 1890 and 1920.

=== Extinction types ===
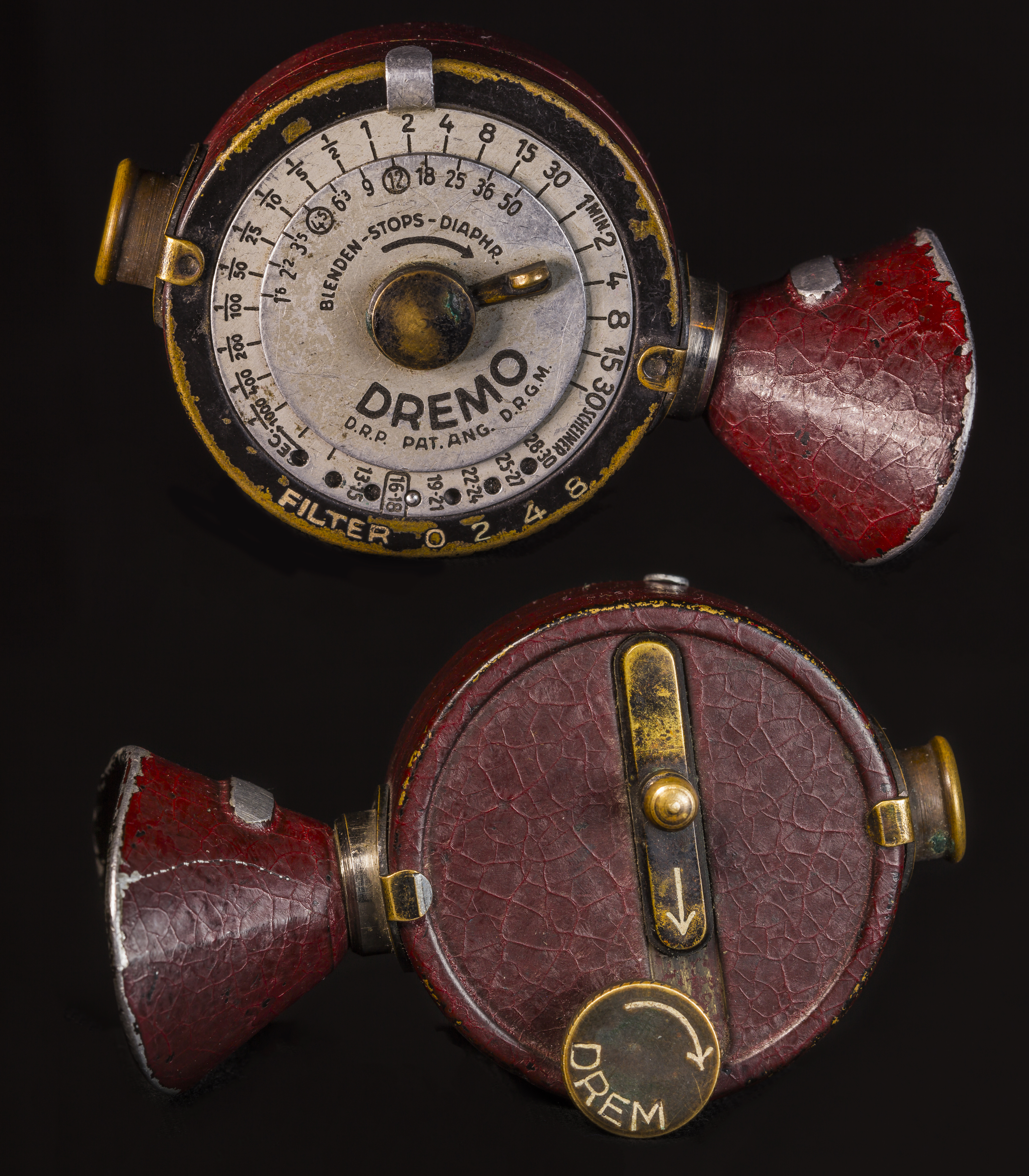
Dremo extinction meter

The next exposure meters, developed at about the same time but not displacing actinometers in popularity until the 1920s and 1930s, are known as extinction meters, evaluating the correct exposure settings by variable attenuation. One type of extinction meter contained a numbered or lettered row of neutral density filters of increasing density. The photographer would position the meter in front of their subject and note the filter with the greatest density that still allowed incident light to pass through. In another example, sold as Heyde's Aktino-Photometer starting from the early 1900s, the photographer views the scene through an eyepiece and turns the meter to vary the effective density until the scene can no longer be seen. The letter or number corresponding to the filter strength causing the "extinction" of the scene was used as an index into a chart of appropriate aperture and shutter speed combinations for a given film speed.

Extinction meters tended to provide inconsistent results because they depended on subjective interpretation and the light sensitivity of the human eye, which can vary from person to person.

=== Photoelectric types ===
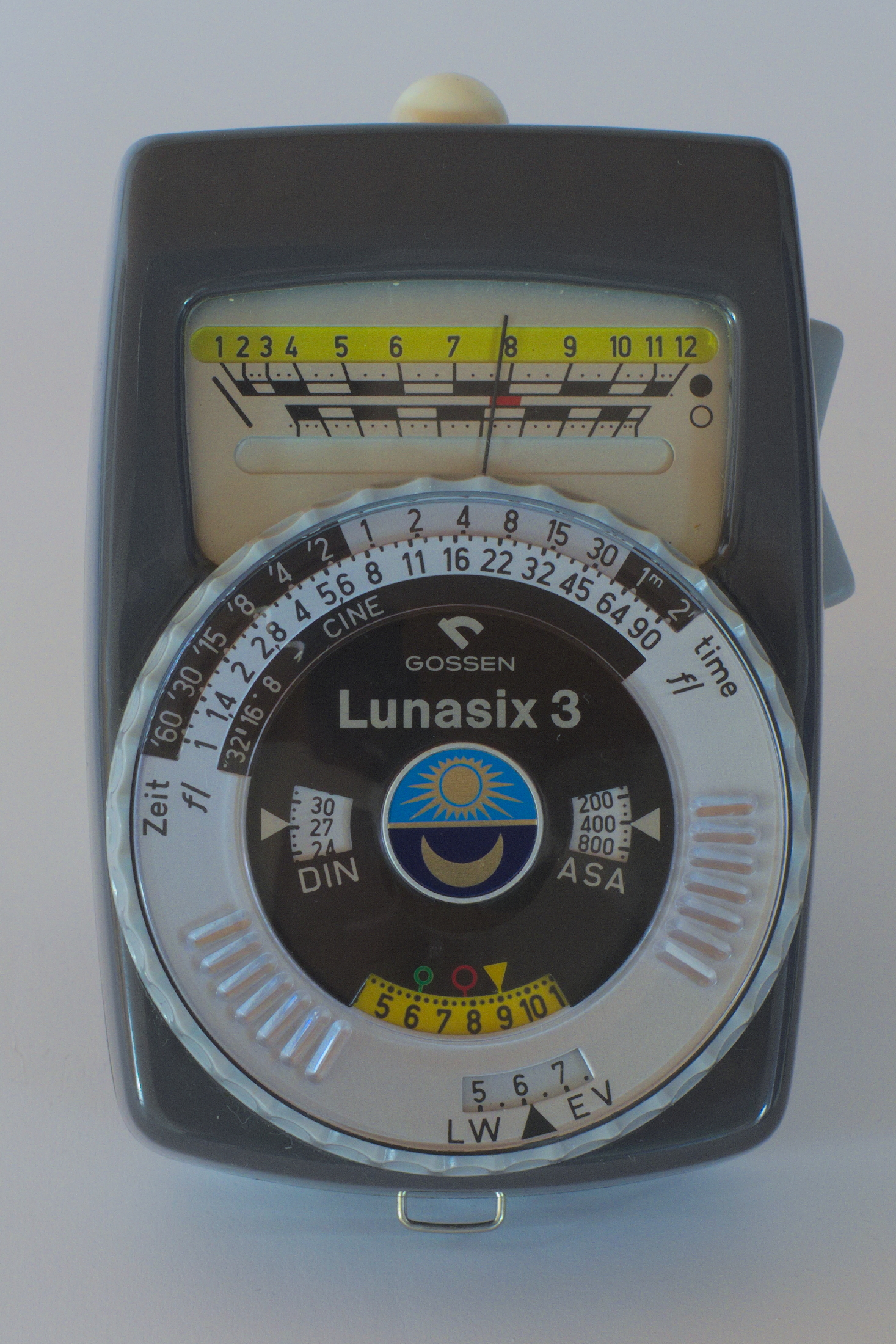
Gossen Lunasix 3 (in US: Luna Pro) using CdS photoresistor with analog readout; available from 1961 to 1977

Starting in 1932, electronic light meters removed the human element and relied on technologies incorporating (in chronological order) selenium, CdS (1960s), and silicon (semiconductor, 1970s) photodetectors. Most modern light meters use silicon sensors. They indicate the exposure either with a needle galvanometer or on an LCD screen.

Selenium light meters use sensors that are photovoltaic: they generate a voltage proportional to light exposure. Selenium sensors generate enough voltage for direct connection to a meter; they need no battery to operate and this made them very convenient in completely mechanical cameras. Selenium sensors however cannot measure low light accurately (ordinary lightbulbs can take them close to their limits) and are altogether unable to measure very low light, such as candlelight, moonlight, starlight etc.

CdS light meters use a photoresistor sensor whose electrical resistance decreases proportionately to the intensity of light exposure. These require a battery to operate, but are significantly more sensitive to low light, able to detect lighting levels approximately 1/100 of the lower sensitivity limit of selenium cells. However, CdS sensors fell out of favor due to their slower response and extended sensitivity to red and infrared wavelengths.

Semiconductor sensors are also photovoltaic, but the voltage generated is much weaker than selenium cells and semiconductor-based light meters need an amplification circuit and therefore require a power source such as batteries to operate. These are usually named after the materials and filtration used to ensure the spectral response is similar to the human eye or photographic film, such as 'Silicon Blue Cell' (SBC) or 'GaAs'.

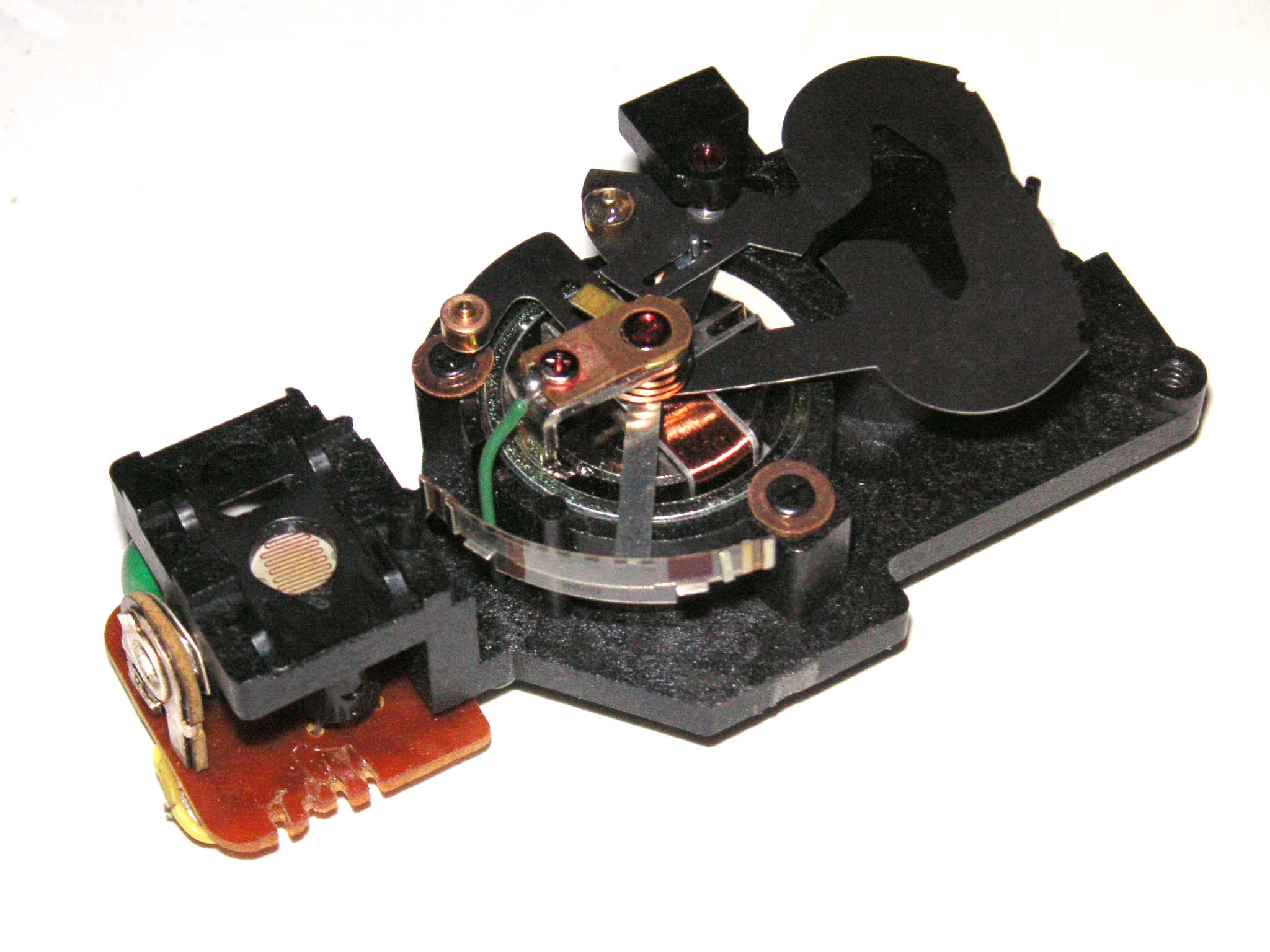
An automatic light meter/exposure unit from an 8 mm movie camera, based on a galvanometer mechanism (center) and a CdS photoresistor, in opening at left.

Many modern consumer still and video cameras include a built-in meter that measures a scene-wide light level and are able to make an approximate measure of appropriate exposure based on that. Photographers working with controlled lighting and cinematographers use handheld light meters to precisely measure the light falling on various parts of their subjects and use suitable lighting to produce the desired exposure levels.

=== Reflected and incident measurements ===
Exposure meters generally are sorted into reflected-light or incident-light types, depending on the method used to measure the scene.

Reflected-light meters measure the light reflected by the scene to be photographed. All in-camera meters are reflected-light meters. Reflected-light meters are calibrated to show the appropriate exposure for "average" scenes. An unusual scene with a preponderance of light colors or specular highlights would have a higher reflectance; a reflected-light meter taking a reading would incorrectly compensate for the difference in reflectance and lead to underexposure. Badly underexposed sunset photos are common exactly because of this effect: the brightness of the setting sun fools the camera's light meter and, unless the in-camera logic or the photographer take care to compensate, the picture will be grossly underexposed and dull.

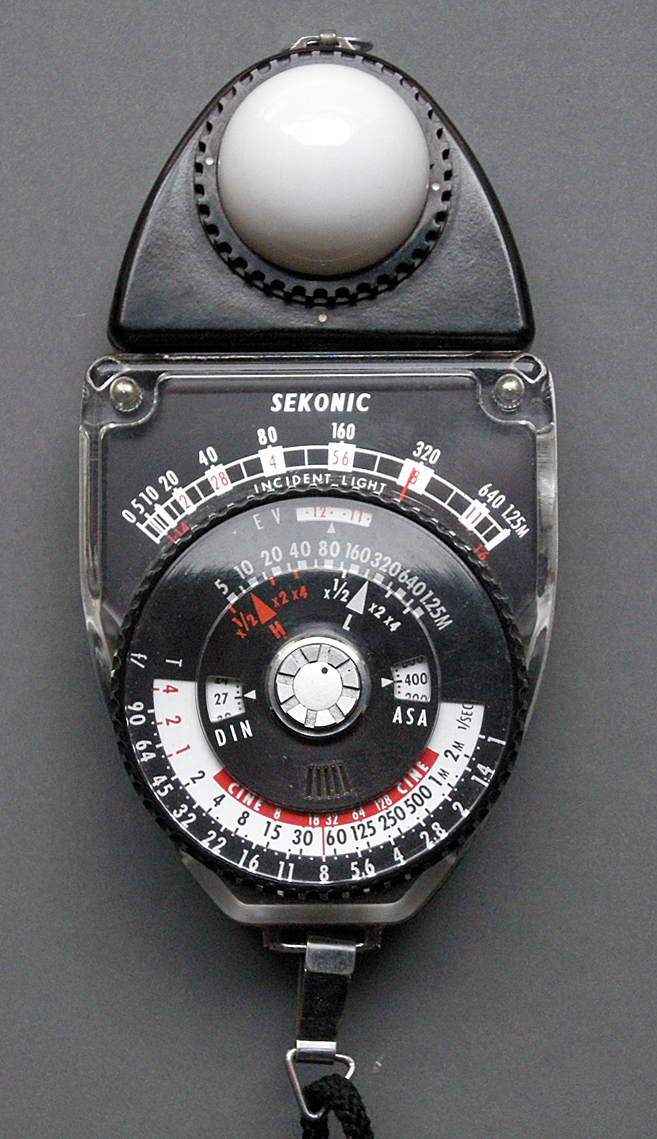
Sekonic L-398, with opalescent incident light-integrating dome

This pitfall (but not in the setting-sun case) is avoided by incident-light meters which measure the amount of light falling on the subject using a diffuser with a flat or (more commonly) hemispherical field of view placed on top of the light sensor. Because the incident-light reading is independent of the subject's reflectance, it is less likely to lead to incorrect exposures for subjects with unusual average reflectance. Taking an incident-light reading requires placing the meter at the subject's position and pointing it in the general direction of the camera, something not always achievable in practice, e.g., in landscape photography where the subject distance approaches infinity.

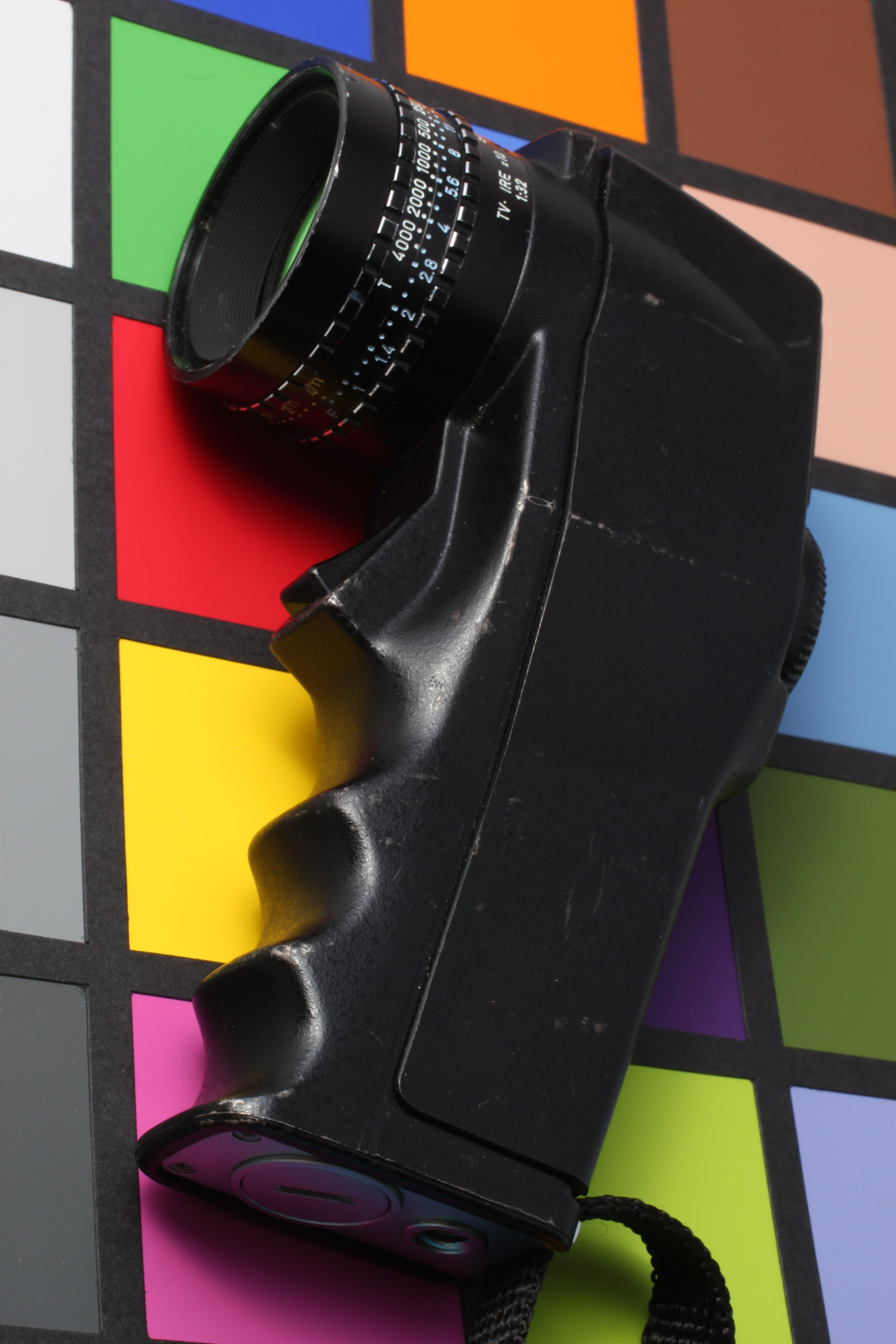
Pentax Digital Spotmeter

Another way to avoid under- or over-exposure for subjects with unusual reflectance is to use a spot meter: a specialized reflected-light meter that measures light in a very tight cone, typically with a one degree circular angle of view. An experienced photographer can take multiple readings over the shadows, midrange, and highlights of the scene to determine optimal exposure, using systems like the Zone System.

Many modern cameras include sophisticated multi-segment metering systems that measure the luminance of different parts of the scene to determine the optimal exposure. When using a film whose spectral sensitivity is not a good match to that of the light meter, for example orthochromatic black-and-white or infrared film, the meter may require special filters and re-calibration to match the sensitivity of the film.

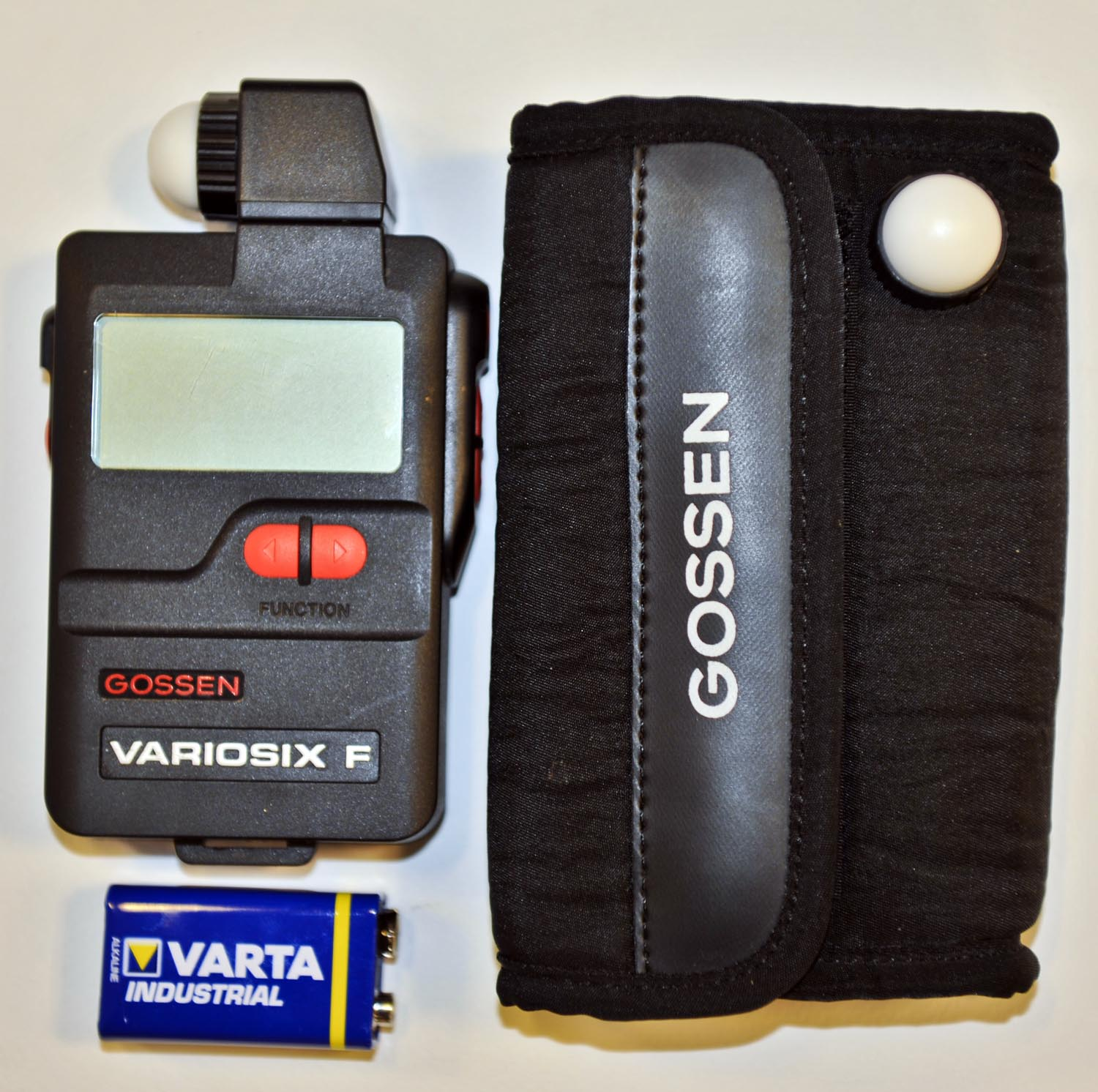
Gossen Variosix (Luna-Star) F, capable of reflected, incident, and flash measurements

There are other types of specialized photographic light meters. Flash meters are used in flash photography to verify correct exposure. Color meters are used where high fidelity in color reproduction is required. Densitometers are used in photographic reproduction.

== Exposure meter calibration ==
In most cases, an incident-light meter will cause a medium tone to be recorded as a medium tone, and a reflected-light meter will cause whatever is metered to be recorded as a medium tone. What constitutes a "medium tone" depends on meter calibration and several other factors, including film processing or digital image conversion.

Meter calibration establishes the relationship between subject lighting and recommended camera settings. The calibration of photographic light meters is covered by ISO 2720:1974, which specifies calibration levels and test conditions for general-purpose photoelectric exposure meters that measure reflected or incident light, or both; the standard was last reviewed and confirmed in 2026 and remains current.

=== Exposure equations ===
For reflected-light meters, camera settings are related to ISO speed and subject luminance by the reflected-light exposure equation:

$\frac {N^2} {t} = \frac {L S} {K}$

where

- $N$ is the relative aperture (f-number)
- $t$ is the exposure time ("shutter speed") in seconds
- $L$ is the average scene luminance
- $S$ is the ISO arithmetic speed
- $K$ is the reflected-light meter calibration constant

For incident-light meters, camera settings are related to ISO speed and subject illuminance by the incident-light exposure equation:

$$\frac {N^2} {t} = \frac {E S} {C}$$

where

- $E$ is the illuminance
- $C$ is the incident-light meter calibration constant

=== Calibration constants ===
Determination of calibration constants has been largely subjective; ISO 2720:1974 states that

The constants $K$ and $C$ shall be chosen by statistical analysis of the results of a large number of tests carried out to determine the acceptability to a large number of observers, of a number of photographs, for which the exposure was known, obtained under various conditions of subject manner and over a range of luminances.

In practice, the variation of the calibration constants among manufacturers is considerably less than this statement might imply, and values have changed little since the early 1970s.

ISO 2720:1974 recommends a range for $K$ of 10.6 to 13.4 with luminance in cd/m^{2}. Two values for $K$ are in common use: 12.5 (Canon, Nikon, and Sekonic) and 14 (Minolta, Kenko, and Pentax); the difference between the two values is approximately 1/6 EV.

The earliest calibration standards were developed for use with wide-angle averaging reflected-light meters (Jones and Condit 1941). Although wide-angle average metering has largely given way to other metering sensitivity patterns (e.g., spot, center-weighted, and multi-segment), the values for $K$ determined for wide-angle averaging meters have remained.

The incident-light calibration constant depends on the type of light receptor. Two receptor types are common: flat (cosine-responding) and hemispherical (cardioid-responding). With a flat receptor, ISO 2720:1974 recommends a range for $C$ of 240 to 400 with illuminance in lux; a value of 250 is commonly used. A flat receptor typically is used for measurement of lighting ratios, for measurement of illuminance, and occasionally, for determining exposure for a flat subject.

For determining practical photographic exposure, a hemispherical receptor has proven more effective. Don Norwood, inventor of incident-light exposure meter with a hemispherical receptor, thought that a sphere was a reasonable representation of a photographic subject. According to his patent (Norwood 1938), the objective was

to provide an exposure meter which is substantially uniformly responsive to light incident upon the photographic subject from practically all directions which would result in the reflection of light to the camera or other photographic register.

and the meter provided for "measurement of the effective illumination obtaining at the position of the subject."

With a hemispherical receptor, ISO 2720:1974 recommends a range for $C$ of 320 to 540 with illuminance in lux; in practice, values typically are between 320 (Minolta) and 340 (Sekonic). The relative responses of flat and hemispherical receptors depend upon the number and type of light sources; when each receptor is pointed at a small light source, a hemispherical receptor with $C$ = 330 will indicate an exposure approximately 0.40 step greater than that indicated by a flat receptor with $C$ = 250. With a slightly revised definition of illuminance, measurements with a hemispherical receptor indicate "effective scene illuminance."

=== Calibrated reflectance ===
It is commonly stated that reflected-light meters are calibrated to an 18% reflectance, but the calibration has nothing to do with reflectance, as should be evident from the exposure formulas. However, some notion of reflectance is implied by a comparison of incident- and reflected-light meter calibration.

Combining the reflected-light and incident-light exposure equations and rearranging gives

$$\frac {L} {E} = \frac {K} {C}$$

Reflectance $R$ is defined as

$$R = \frac {\mbox {flux emitted from surface}} {\mbox {flux incident upon surface}}$$

A uniform perfect diffuser (one following Lambert's cosine law) of luminance $L$ emits a flux density of $\pi$$L$; reflectance then is

$$R = \frac {\pi L} {E} = \frac {\pi K} {C}$$

Illuminance is measured with a flat receptor. It is straightforward to compare an incident-light measurement using a flat receptor with a reflected-light measurement of a uniformly illuminated flat surface of constant reflectance. Using values of 12.5 for $K$ and 250 for $C$ gives

$$R = \frac {\pi \times 12.5} {250} \approx 15.7\%$$

With a $K$ of 14, the reflectance would be 17.6%, close to that of a standard 18% neutral test card. In theory, an incident-light measurement should agree with a reflected-light measurement of a test card of suitable reflectance that is perpendicular to the direction to the meter. However, a test card seldom is a uniform diffuser, so incident- and reflected-light measurements might differ slightly.

In a typical scene, many elements are not flat and are at various orientations to the camera, so that for practical photography, a hemispherical receptor usually has proven more effective for determining exposure. Using values of 12.5 for $K$ and 330 for $C$ gives

$$R = \frac {\pi \times 12.5} {330} \approx 11.9\%$$

With a slightly revised definition of reflectance, this result can be taken as indicating that the average scene reflectance is approximately 12%. A typical scene includes shaded areas as well as areas that receive direct illumination, and a wide-angle averaging reflected-light meter responds to these differences in illumination as well as differing reflectances of various scene elements. Average scene reflectance then would be

$$\mbox{average scene reflectance} =
\frac {\mbox {average scene luminance} } {\mbox {effective scene illuminance }}$$

where "effective scene illuminance" is that measured by a meter with a hemispherical receptor.

ISO 2720:1974 calls for reflected-light calibration to be measured by aiming the receptor at a transilluminated diffuse surface, and for incident-light calibration to be measured by aiming the receptor at a point source in a darkened room. For a perfectly diffusing test card and perfectly diffusing flat receptor, the comparison between a reflected-light measurement and an incident-light measurement is valid for any position of the light source. However, the response of a hemispherical receptor to an off-axis light source is approximately that of a cardioid rather than a cosine, so the 12% "reflectance" determined for an incident-light meter with a hemispherical receptor is valid only when the light source is on the receptor axis.

=== Cameras with internal meters ===
Calibration of automatic exposure control systems built into or coupled with film cameras is covered by ISO 2721: the first edition was published in 1982, and the second edition, ISO 2721:2013, specifies the exposure at the focal plane for given values of field luminance and film speed. Nonetheless, many manufacturers specify (though seldom state) exposure calibration in terms of $K$, and many calibration instruments (e.g., Kyoritsu-Arrowin multi-function camera testers ) use the specified $K$ to set the test parameters.

== Exposure determination with a neutral test card ==
If a scene differs considerably from a statistically average scene, a wide-angle averaging reflected-light measurement may not indicate the correct exposure. To simulate an average scene, a substitute measurement sometimes is made of a neutral test card, or gray card.

At best, a flat card is an approximation to a three-dimensional scene, and measurement of a test card may lead to underexposure unless adjustment is made. The instructions for a Kodak neutral test card recommend that the indicated exposure be increased by 1/2 step for a frontlighted scene in sunlight. The instructions also recommend that the test card be held vertically and faced in a direction midway between the Sun and the camera; similar directions are also given in the Kodak Professional Photoguide. The combination of exposure increase and the card orientation gives recommended exposures that are reasonably close to those given by an incident-light meter with a hemispherical receptor when metering with an off-axis light source.

In practice, additional complications may arise. Many neutral test cards are far from perfectly diffuse reflectors, and specular reflections can cause increased reflected-light meter readings that, if followed, would result in underexposure. It is possible that the neutral test card instructions include a correction for specular reflections.

== Use in illumination ==
Light meters or light detectors are also used in illumination. Their purpose is to measure the illumination level in the interior and to switch off or reduce the output level of luminaires. This can greatly reduce the energy burden of the building by significantly increasing the efficiency of its lighting system. It is therefore recommended to use light meters in lighting systems, especially in rooms where one cannot expect users to pay attention to manually switching off the lights. Examples include hallways, stairs, and big halls.

There are, however, significant obstacles to overcome in order to achieve a successful implementation of light meters in lighting systems, of which user acceptance is by far the most formidable. Unexpected or too frequent switching and too bright or too dark rooms are very annoying and disturbing for users of the rooms. Therefore, different switching algorithms have been developed:

- difference algorithm, where lights are switched on at a lower light level than they switch off, so that the difference between the light levels of the 'on' and 'off' states is not too large
- time delay algorithms:
  - a certain amount of time must pass since the last switch
  - a certain amount of time at a sufficient illumination level must pass.

== Other uses ==
In scientific research and development, a light meter consists of a radiometer (the electronics and readout), a photodiode or other sensor (which generates an output when exposed to light or other electromagnetic radiation), a filter (which modifies the incoming light so that only the desired part of the radiation reaches the sensor) and a cosine-correcting input optic (which allows the sensor to respond accurately to light arriving from all directions).

When the term light meter or photometer is used instead of radiometer or optometer, it is often assumed that the system is configured to detect only visible light. Visible-light sensors are often called illuminance or photometric sensors because they are filtered to be sensitive only to wavelengths of about 400–700 nanometers (nm), mimicking the sensitivity of the human eye. The accuracy of such a meter often depends on how closely the filtration matches the response of the eye.

The sensor will send a signal to the meter that is proportional to the amount of light that reaches the sensor after being collected by the optics and passing through the filter. The meter then converts the incoming signal (typically a current or voltage) from the sensor into a reading in calibrated units such as foot-candles (fc) or lux (lm/m^{2}). The calibration converts the signal from volts or milliamperes into these units and also provides accuracy and unit-to-unit repeatability. National Institute of Standards and Technology (NIST) traceability and ISO/IEC 17025 accreditation are two well known terms that verify the system includes a valid calibration.

The meter/radiometer/photometer portion may have many features including:

Zero: subtracts ambient or background light levels, or stabilizes the meter to the working environment

Hold: freezes the value on the display.

Range: for systems that are not linear and auto ranging this function allows the user to select the portion of the meter electronics that best handles the signal level in use.

Units: For illuminance the units are typically only lux and foot-candles but many light meters can also be used for UV, VIS and IR applications so the readout could change to W/cm^2, candela, Watts etc.

Integrate: sums up the values into a dose or exposure level i.e. lux*sec or J/cm^2.

Along with having a variety of features, a light meter may also be usable for a variety of applications. These may include the measurement of other bands of light such as UVA, UVB, UVC and near infrared. For example, UVA and UVB light meters are used for phototherapy or treatment of skin conditions, germicidal radiometers are used for measuring the UVC level from lamps used for disinfection and sterilization, luminance meters are used to measure the brightness of a sign, display or exit sign, PAR quantum sensors are used to measure how much of a given light source's emission will help plants grow, and UV-curing radiometers test how much of the lights emission is effective for hardening a glue, plastic, or protective coating.

Some light meters also have the ability to provide a readout in many different units. Lux and foot-candles are the common units for visible light, but candelas, lumens and candelas per square meter are also used. For disinfection, UVC is typically measured in watts per square centimeter, or watts for a given individual lamp assembly, whereas systems used in the context of the curing of coatings often provide readouts in Joules per Square centimeter. Regular measurements of UVC light intensity thus can serve to provide assurance of proper disinfection of water and food-preparation surfaces, or reliable coating hardness in painted products.

Although a light meter can take the form of a very simple handheld tool with one-button operation, there are also many advanced light-measurement systems available for use in numerous different applications. These can be incorporated into automated systems that can, for example, wipe lamps clean when a certain reduction in output is detected, or that can trigger an alarm when lamp-failure occurs.

== See also ==
- Selenium meter
- Photometer | Photodetector
- Colorimetry | Photometry | Radiometry
- Light value
- Photomultiplier tubes for detecting light at very low levels.
- PIN diode solid state electronic devices for detecting incident light.
