= APEX system =

APEX stands for Additive System of Photographic Exposure, which was proposed in the 1960 ASA standard for monochrome film speed, ASA PH2.5-1960, as a means of simplifying exposure computation.

== Exposure equation ==
Until the late 1960s, cameras did not have built-in exposure meters, and many photographers did not have external exposure meters. Consequently, it often was necessary to calculate exposure from lighting conditions. The relationship of recommended photographic exposure to a scene's average luminance is given by the camera exposure equation
$$\frac {A^2} {T} = \frac {B S_x} {K} \,$$
where

- $A$ is the f-number (reciprocal of the relative aperture);
- $T$ is the exposure time ("shutter speed") in seconds;
- $B$ is the average scene luminance ("brightness");
- $S_x$ is the ASA arithmetic film speed; and
- $K$ is the reflected-light meter calibration constant.

Use of the symbol $B$ for luminance reflects photographic industry practice at the time of ASA PH2.5-1960; current SI practice prefers the symbol $L$. German sources typically used $k$ for the relative aperture. Many authors now use $N$ and $t$ for relative aperture and exposure time.

Recommendations for the value of the calibration constant $K$ in applicable ANSI and ISO standards have varied slightly over the years; this topic is discussed in greater detail under Exposure meter calibration in the Light meter article.

== Exposure value ==
In an attempt to simplify choosing among combinations of equivalent camera settings, the concept of exposure values (German: Lichtwert) was originally developed and proposed to other manufacturers by the German shutter manufacturer Friedrich Deckel in the early 1950s. Combinations of shutter speed and relative aperture that resulted in the same exposure were said to have the same exposure value $E_v$, a base-2 logarithmic scale defined by
$$E_v = \log_2 {\frac {A^2} {T} } = \log_2 {\frac {B S_x} {K} } \,.$$

When applied to the left-hand side of the exposure equation, $E_v$ denoted combinations of camera settings; when applied to the right-hand side, $E_v$ denoted combinations of luminance and film speed. For a given film speed, the recommended exposure value was determined solely by the luminance. Once the exposure value was determined, it could be directly set on cameras with an $E_v$ scale. Adjustment of exposure was simple, because a change of 1 $E_v$ corresponded to a change of 1 exposure step, i.e., either a halving or doubling of exposure.

Starting 1954, the so-called Exposure Value Scale (EVS), originally known as Light Value Scale (LVS), was adopted by Rollei, Hasselblad, Voigtländer, Braun, Kodak, Seikosha, Aires, Konica, Olympus, Ricoh and others, introducing lenses with coupled shutters and apertures, such that, after setting the exposure value, adjusting either the shutter speed or aperture made a corresponding adjustment in the other to maintain a constant exposure. On some models, the coupling of shutter speed and aperture setting was optional, so that photographers could choose their preferred method of working depending on the situation.

Modern cameras no longer display exposure values as such, but continue to offer exposure modes, which support users in employing the concept of counter-adjusting shutter speed and aperture at a fixed point of exposure. This can be found in features such as Manual Shift on some Minolta, Konica Minolta and Sony Alpha or Hyper Manual on some Pentax film and digital SLRs since 1991, where the photographer can change one of the parameters, and the camera will adjust the other accordingly for as long as the Auto-Exposure Lock (AEL) function is activated. In a wider sense, functions like Program Shift, Pa / Ps Creative Program Control (by Minolta, Konica Minolta and Sony) or Hyper Program (by Pentax) belong to this group of features as well.

== The additive (logarithmic) system ==
Although some photographers (Adams 1981, 66) routinely determined camera settings using the exposure equation, it generally was assumed that doing so would prove too daunting for the casual photographer. The 1942 ASA exposure guide, ASA Z38.2.2-1942, featured a dial calculator, and revisions in 1949 and 1955 used a similar approach.

An alternative simplification also was possible: ASA PH2.5-1960 proposed extending the concept of exposure value to all exposure parameters. Taking base-2 logarithms of both sides of the exposure equation and separating numerators and denominators reduces exposure calculation to a matter of addition:
$$E_v = A_v + T_v = B_v + S_v \,,$$
where

- $A_v$ is the aperture value: $A_v = \log_2 {A^2}$;
- $T_v$ is the time value: $T_v = \log_2 {(1/T)}$;
- $E_v$ is the exposure value: $E_v = A_v + T_v$;
- $S_v$ is the speed value (aka sensitivity value), such that $S_v = \log_2{(N S_x)}$;
- $B_v$ is the luminance value (aka brightness value), such that $B_v = \log_2{(B / N K)}$;
- $N$ is a constant that establishes the relationship between the ASA arithmetic film speed $S_x$ and the ASA speed value $S_v$, with a value of N ≈ 0.30 (precisely, $2^{-7/4}$); and
- $K$ is the reflected-light meter calibration constant.

ASA standards covered incident-light meters as well as reflected-light meters; the incident-light exposure equation is
$$\frac {A^2} {T} = \frac {I S_x} {C} \,,$$
where

- $I$ is the scene illuminance; and
- $C$ is the incident-light meter calibration constant.

The use of $I$ for illuminance reflects photographic industry practice at the time of the 1961 ASA standard for exposure meters, ASA PH2.12-1961; current SI practice prefers the symbol $E$.

ASA PH2.12-1961 included incident-light metering in the APEX concept:
$$E_v = A_v + T_v = I_v + S_v \,,$$
where $I_v$ is the incident-light value: $I_v = \log_2{(I / N C)}$.

(German sources typically use $LW$ (for Lichtwert or Belichtungswert – but not to be confused with the English term light value) instead of the exposure value's symbol $E_v$. Consequently, the aperture value $A_v$ is referred to as Blendenleitwert $LWk$, and the time value $T_v$ as Zeitleitwert $LWt$. The film speed value $S_v$ is named Empfindlichkeitsleitwert, and the brightness value $B_v$ is known as Objekthelligkeit.)

== APEX in practice ==
APEX made exposure computation a relatively simple matter; the foreword of ASA PH2.5-1960 recommended that exposure meters, exposure calculators, and exposure tables be modified to incorporate the logarithmic values that APEX required. In many instances, this was done: the 1973 and 1986 ANSI exposure guides, ANSI PH2.7-1973 and ANSI PH2.7-1986, eliminated exposure calculator dials in favor of tabulated APEX values. However, the logarithmic markings for aperture and shutter speed required to set the computed exposure were never incorporated in consumer cameras. Accordingly, no reference to APEX was made in ANSI PH3.49-1971 (though it was included in the Appendix). The incorporation of exposure meters in many cameras in the late 1960s eliminated the need to compute exposure, so APEX saw little actual use.

With the passage of time, formatting of APEX quantities has varied considerably; although the $v$ originally was subscript, it sometimes was given simply as lower case, and sometimes as uppercase. Treating these quantities as acronyms rather than quantity symbols probably is reasonable because several of the quantity symbols ($E$, $B$, and $I$ for exposure, luminance, and illuminance) used at the time APEX was proposed are in conflict with current preferred SI practice.

A few artifacts of APEX remain. Canon, Pentax and Leica cameras use 'Av' and 'Tv' to indicate relative aperture and shutter speed as well as to symbolize aperture priority and shutter priority modes. Some Pentax DSLRs even provide a 'TAv' exposure mode to automatically set the ISO speed depending on the desired aperture and shutter settings, and 'Sv' (for sensitivity priority) to pre-set the ISO speed and let the camera choose the other parameters. Some meters, such as Pentax spot meters, directly indicate the exposure value for ISO 100 film speed. For a given film speed, exposure value is directly related to luminance, although the relationship depends on the reflected-light meter calibration constant $K$. Most photographic equipment manufacturers specify metering sensitivities in EV at ISO 100 speed (the uppercase 'V' is almost universal).

It is common to express exposure increments in EV, as when adjusting exposure relative to what a light meter indicates (Ray 2000, 316). For example, an exposure compensation of +1 EV (or +1 step) means to increase exposure, by using either a longer exposure time or a smaller f-number. The sense of exposure compensation is opposite that of the EV scale itself. An increase in exposure corresponds to a decrease in EV, so an exposure compensation of +1 EV results in a smaller EV; conversely, an exposure compensation of −1 EV results in a greater EV.

== Use of APEX values in Exif ==
APEX has seen a partial resurrection in the Exif standard, which calls for storing exposure data using APEX values. There are some minor differences from the original APEX in both terminology and values. The implied value (1/3.125) for the speed scaling constant $N$ given in the Exif 2.2 specification ("Exif 2.2"; JEITA 2002) differs slightly from the APEX value of $2^{-7/4}$ (0.2973); with the Exif value, an ISO arithmetic film speed of 100 corresponds exactly to a speed value $S_\mathrm {v}$ of 5.

The relationship between $B_{\mathrm {v}}$ and luminance depends on both the speed scaling constant $N$ and the reflected-light meter calibration constant $K$:
$$B_\mathrm {v} = \log_2 \frac {B} {NK} \,.$$

Because Exif 2.2 records ISO arithmetic speed rather than film sensitivity, the value of $N$ affects the recorded value of $B_{\mathrm {v}}$ but not the recorded film speed.

Exif 2.2 does not recommend a range of values for $K$, presumably leaving the choice to the equipment manufacturer. The example data in Annex C of Exif 2.2 give 1 footlambert for $B_{\mathrm {v}}$ = 0. This is in agreement with the APEX value for $B$, but would imply $K = 1/N$, or 3.125 with $B$ in footlamberts. With $B$ in cd/m^{2}, this becomes 10.7, which is slightly less than the value of 12.5 recommended by ISO 2720:1974 and currently used by many manufacturers. The difference possibly arises from rounding $B$ in the example table; it also is possible that the example data simply were copied from an old ASA or ANSI standard.
