= Exposure value =

Measure of illuminance for a combination of a camera's shutter speed and f-number

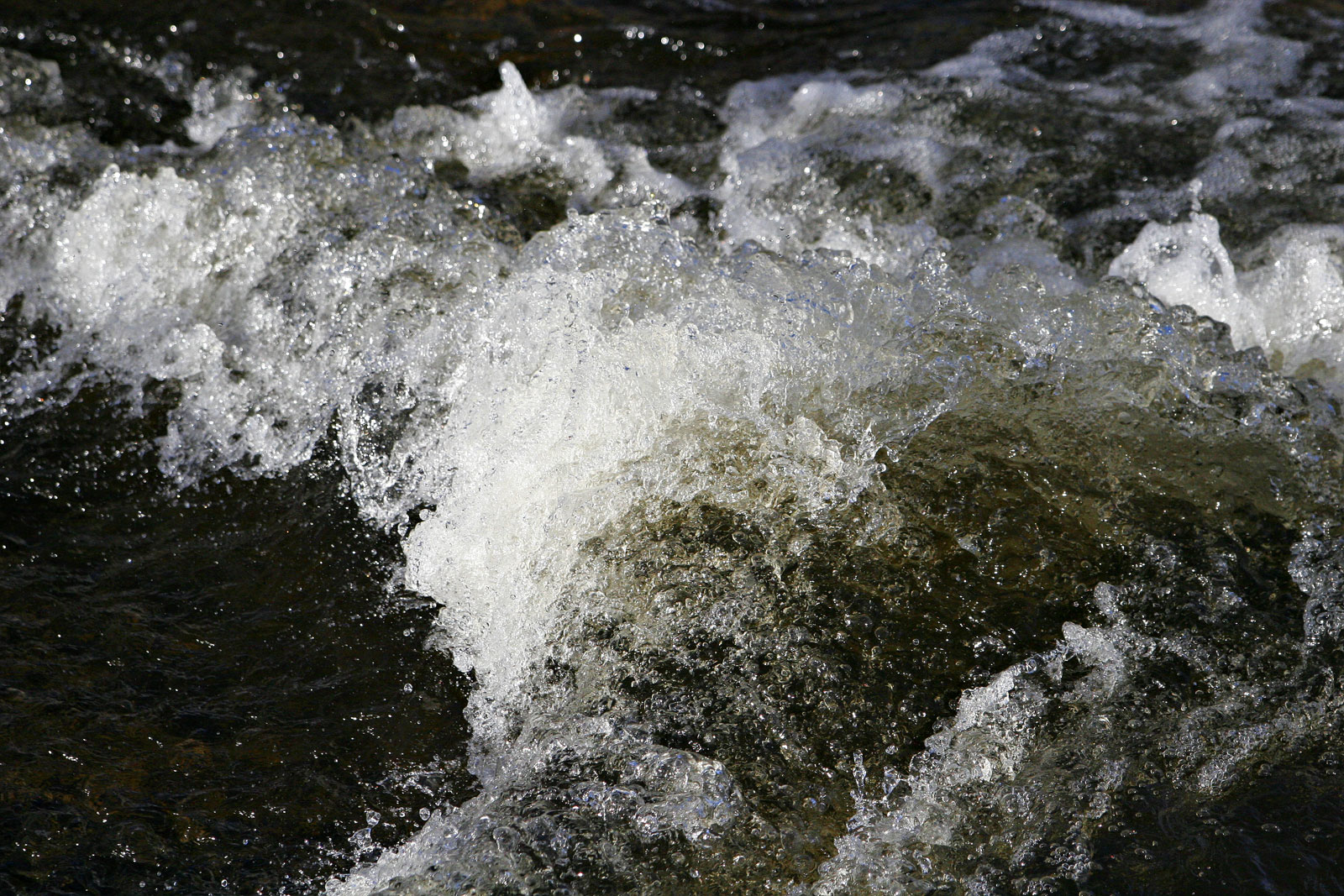
Fast shutter speed (short exposure time) of a breaking wave

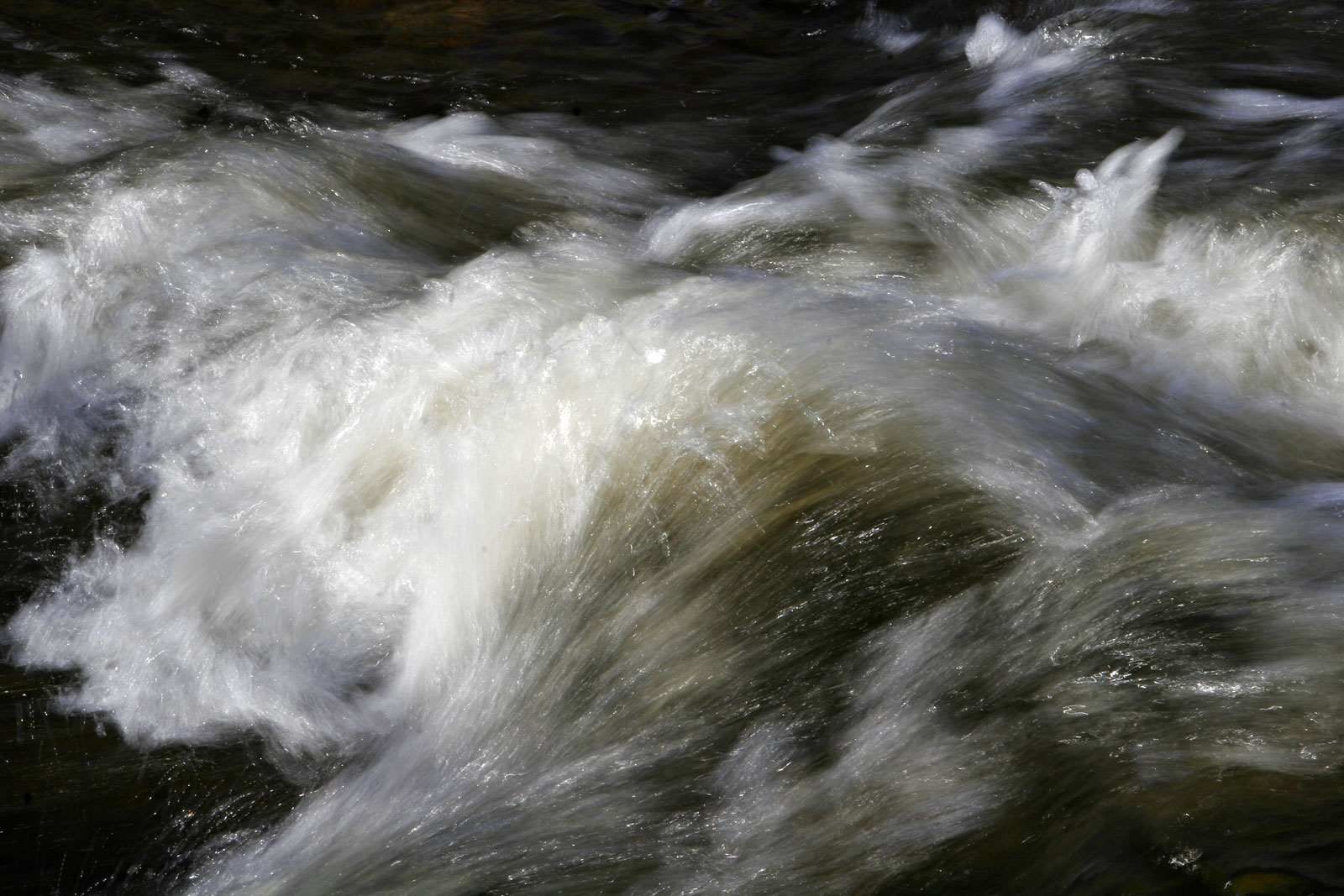
Slow shutter speed (long exposure time) of a breaking wave

In photography, exposure value (EV) is a number that represents a combination of a camera's shutter speed and f-number, such that all combinations that yield the same exposure have the same EV (for any fixed scene luminance). Exposure value is also used to indicate an interval on the photographic exposure scale, with a difference of 1 EV corresponding to a standard power-of-2 exposure step, commonly referred to as a stop. (Note: In optics, the term "stop" properly refers to the aperture itself, while the term "step" refers to a division of the exposure scale. Some authors, e.g., Davis (1999), p. 13, prefer the term "stop" because they refer to steps (e.g., on a step tablet) that are other than powers of 2. ISO standards generally use "step", while photographers normally use "stop".)

The EV concept was developed by the German shutter manufacturer Friedrich Deckel in the 1950s. Its intent was to simplify choosing among equivalent camera exposure settings by replacing combinations of shutter speed and f-number (e.g., 1/125 s at f/16) with a single number (e.g., 15). On some lenses with leaf shutters, the process was further simplified by allowing the shutter and aperture controls to be linked such that, when one was changed, the other was automatically adjusted to maintain the same exposure. This was especially helpful to beginners with limited understanding of the effects of shutter speed and aperture and the relationship between them. But it was also useful for experienced photographers who might choose a shutter speed to stop motion or an f-number for depth of field, because it allowed for faster adjustment—without the need for mental calculations—and reduced the chance of error when making the adjustment.

The concept became known as the Light Value System (LVS) in Europe; it was generally known as the Exposure Value System (EVS) when the features became available on cameras in the United States.

Because of mechanical considerations, the coupling of shutter and aperture was limited to lenses with leaf shutters; however, various automatic exposure modes now work to somewhat the same effect in cameras with focal-plane shutters.

The proper EV was determined by the scene luminance and film speed; it was intended that the system also include adjustment for filters, exposure compensation, and other variables. With all of these elements included, the camera would be set by transferring the single number thus determined.

Exposure value has been indicated in various ways. The ASA and ANSI standards used the quantity symbol E_{v}, with the subscript v indicating the logarithmic value; this symbol continues to be used in ISO standards, but the acronym "EV" is more common elsewhere. The Exif standard uses "Ev".

Although all camera settings with the same EV nominally give the same exposure, they do not necessarily give the same picture. The f-number (relative aperture) determines the depth of field, and the shutter speed (exposure time) determines the amount of motion blur, as illustrated by the two properly exposed images of the breaking wave.

== Formal definition ==
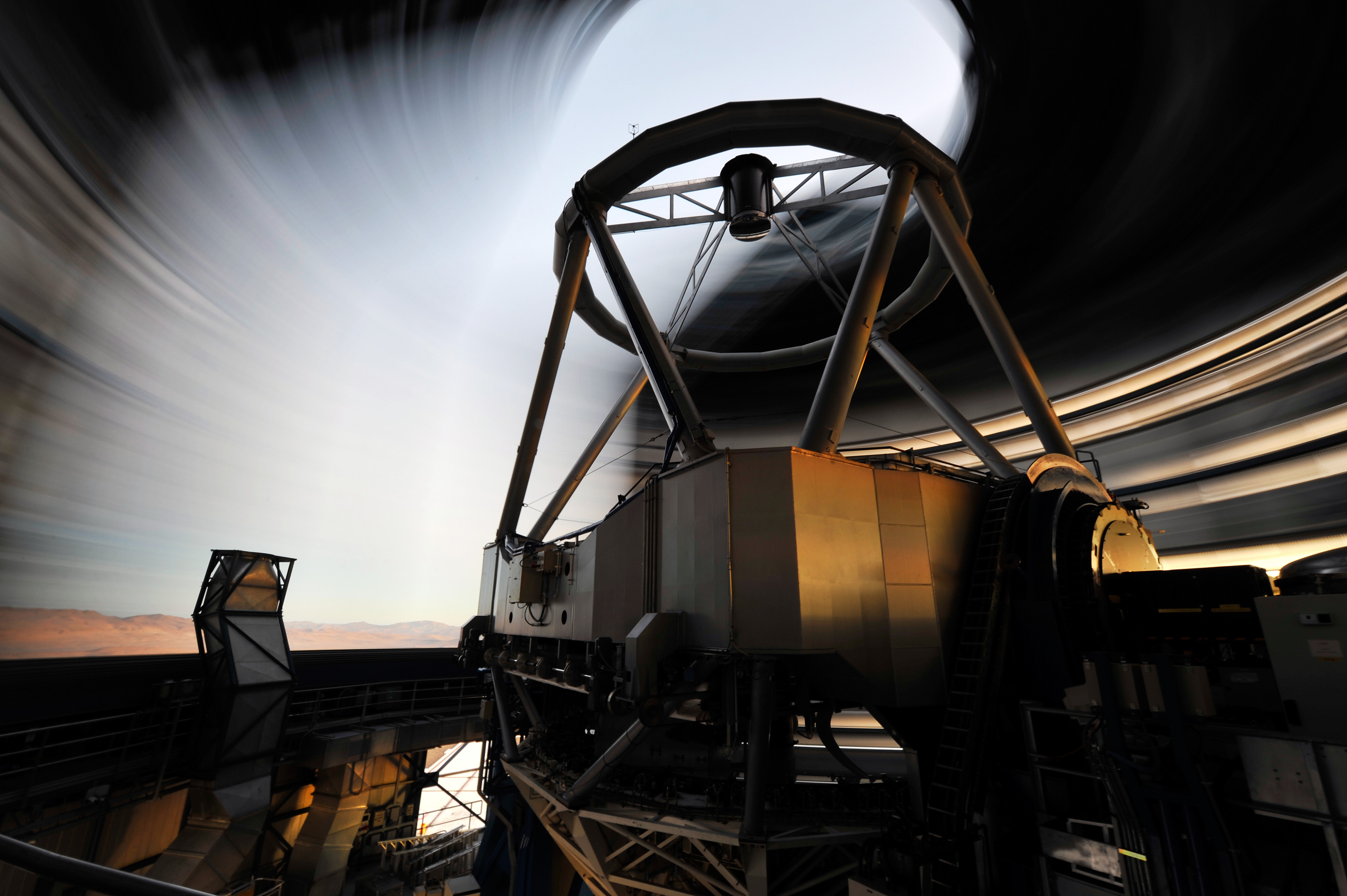
Extended exposure time of 26 seconds

Exposure value is a base-2 logarithmic scale, defined by:

$$\begin{align}
\mathrm {EV} &= \log_2 {\frac {N^2} {t} } \\
&= 2\log_2{N} - \log_2{t} \,,
\end{align}$$

where

- N is the f-number; and
- t is the exposure time ("shutter speed") in seconds. (Note: In a mathematical expression involving physical quantities, it is common practice to require that the argument to a transcendental function (such as the logarithm) be dimensionless. The definition of EV ignores the units in the denominator and uses only the numerical value of the exposure time in seconds; EV is not the expression of a physical law, but simply a number for encoding combinations of camera settings.)

The second line is just applying the quotient identity of logarithms to the first line.

EV 0 corresponds to an exposure time of 1 s and an aperture of f/1.0. If the EV is known, it can be used to select combinations of exposure time and f-number, as shown in Table 1.

Each increment of 1 in exposure value corresponds to a change of one "step" (or, more commonly, one "stop") in exposure, i.e., half as much exposure, either by halving the exposure time or halving the aperture area, or a combination of such changes. Greater exposure values are appropriate for photography in more brightly lit situations, or for lower ISO speeds.

== Camera settings vs. luminous exposure ==
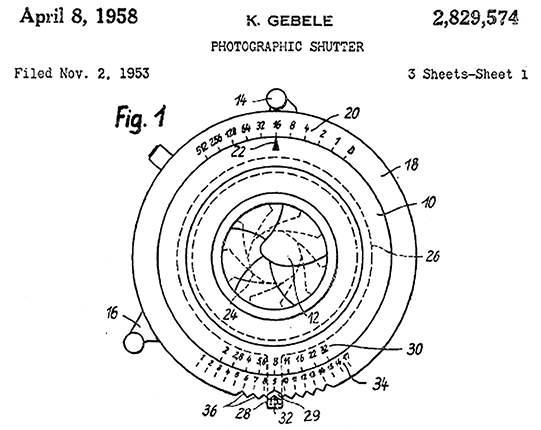
Shutter with EV indicator (item 29) on a ring of EV values (item 34), figure from US patent 2829574, Inventor: K. Gebele, original assignee: Hans Deckel, filing date: Nov 2, 1953, issue date: Apr 8, 1958

"Exposure value" indicates combinations of camera settings rather than the luminous exposure (aka photometric exposure), which is given by

$$H = E t \,,$$

where

- H is the luminous/photometric exposure, in lux-seconds (lx·s);
- E is the image-plane illuminance, in lux (lx), or equivalently lumens per square meter (lm/m^{2}); and
- t is the exposure time ("shutter speed"), in seconds (s).

The illuminance E is controlled by the f-number but also depends on the scene luminance. To avoid confusion, some authors, such as Sidney Ray, have used camera exposure to refer to combinations of camera settings. The 1964 ASA standard for automatic exposure controls for cameras, ASA PH2.15-1964, took the same approach, and also used the more descriptive term camera exposure settings.

Common practice among photographers is nonetheless to use "exposure" to refer to camera settings as well as to photometric exposure.

=== Relationship of camera settings to luminous exposure ===
The image-plane illuminance is directly proportional to the area of the aperture, and hence inversely proportional to the square of the lens f-number; thus

$$H \propto \frac {t} {N^2}$$

for constant lighting conditions, the exposure is constant as long as the ratio t/N^{2} is constant. If, for example, the f-number is changed, an equivalent exposure time can be determined from

$$\frac {t_2} {t_1} = \frac {N_2^2} {N_1^2}\,.$$

Performing this calculation mentally is tedious for most photographers, but the equation is easily solved with a calculator dial on an exposure meter or a similar dial on a standalone calculator. If the camera controls have detents, constant exposure can be maintained by counting the steps as one control is adjusted and counting an equivalent number of steps when adjusting the other control.

=== Representing camera settings: EV ===
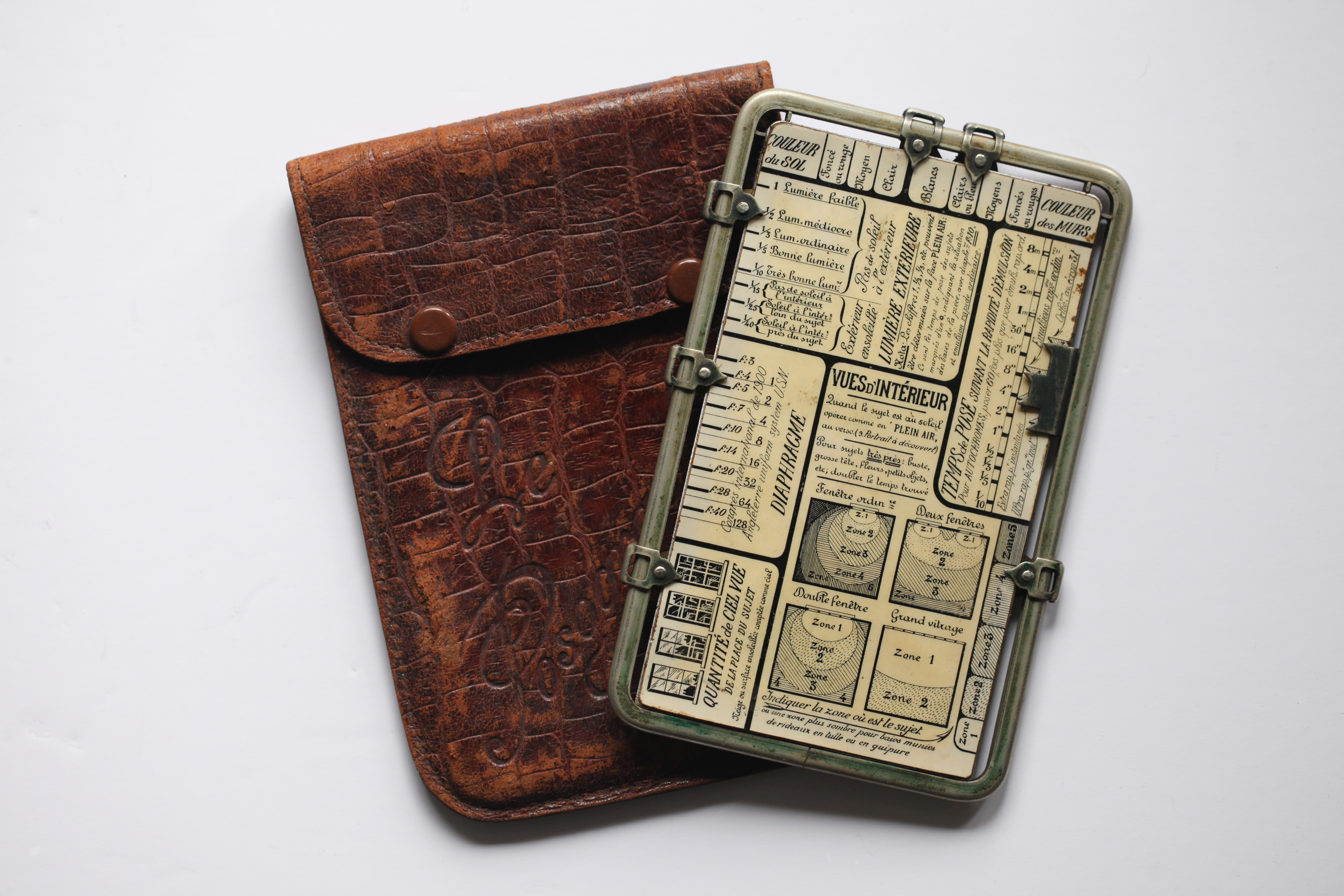
Robert Kaufmann's posographe or exposure calculator from 1922

The ratio t/N^{2} could be used to represent equivalent combinations of exposure time and f-number in a single value. But for many such combinations used in general photography, the ratio gives a fractional value with a large denominator; this is notationally inconvenient as well as difficult to remember. Inverting this ratio and taking the base-2 logarithm allows defining a quantity E_{v} such that

$$\begin{align}
E_\mathrm v &= \log_2 \frac {N^2} {t} \\
&= 2\log_2{N} - \log_2{t}\,,
\end{align}$$

resulting in a value that progresses in a linear sequence as camera exposure is changed in power-of-2 steps. For example, beginning with 1 s and f/1, decreasing exposure gives the simple sequence

$$0, 1, 2, 3, \ldots, 14, 15, \ldots\,.$$

The last two values shown frequently apply when using ISO 100 speed imaging media in outdoor photography.

This system provides its greatest benefit when using an exposure meter (or table) calibrated in EV with a camera that allows settings to be made in EV, especially with coupled shutter and aperture; the appropriate exposure is easily set on the camera, and choosing among equivalent settings is made by adjusting one control.

Current cameras do not allow direct setting of EV, and cameras with automatic exposure control generally obviate the need for it. EV can nonetheless be helpful when used to transfer recommended exposure settings from an exposure meter (or table of recommended exposures) to an exposure calculator (or table of camera settings).

== EV as an indicator of camera settings ==
Used as an indicator of camera settings, EV corresponds to actual combinations of shutter speed and aperture setting. When the actual EV matches that recommended by the light level and the ISO speed, these settings should result in the "correct" exposure.

Table 1: Exposure times, in seconds or minutes (m), for various exposure values and f-numbers
EV	f-number												
EV	1.0	1.4	2.0	2.8	4.0	5.6	8.0	11	16	22	32	45	64
−6	60	2 m	4 m	8 m	16 m	32 m	64 m	128 m	256 m	512 m	1024 m	2048 m	4096 m
−5	30	60	2 m	4 m	8 m	16 m	32 m	64 m	128 m	256 m	512 m	1024 m	2048 m
−4	15	30	60	2 m	4 m	8 m	16 m	32 m	64 m	128 m	256 m	512 m	1024 m
−3	8	15	30	60	2 m	4 m	8 m	16 m	32 m	64 m	128 m	256 m	512 m
−2	4	8	15	30	60	2 m	4 m	8 m	16 m	32 m	64 m	128 m	256 m
−1	2	4	8	15	30	60	2 m	4 m	8 m	16 m	32 m	64 m	128 m
0	1	2	4	8	15	30	60	2 m	4 m	8 m	16 m	32 m	64 m
1	1/2	1	2	4	8	15	30	60	2 m	4 m	8 m	16 m	32 m
2	1/4	1/2	1	2	4	8	15	30	60	2 m	4 m	8 m	16 m
3	1/8	1/4	1/2	1	2	4	8	15	30	60	2 m	4 m	8 m
4	1/15	1/8	1/4	1/2	1	2	4	8	15	30	60	2 m	4 m
5	1/30	1/15	1/8	1/4	1/2	1	2	4	8	15	30	60	2 m
6	1/60	1/30	1/15	1/8	1/4	1/2	1	2	4	8	15	30	60
7	1/125	1/60	1/30	1/15	1/8	1/4	1/2	1	2	4	8	15	30
8	1/250	1/125	1/60	1/30	1/15	1/8	1/4	1/2	1	2	4	8	15
9	1/500	1/250	1/125	1/60	1/30	1/15	1/8	1/4	1/2	1	2	4	8
10	1/1000	1/500	1/250	1/125	1/60	1/30	1/15	1/8	1/4	1/2	1	2	4
11	1/2000	1/1000	1/500	1/250	1/125	1/60	1/30	1/15	1/8	1/4	1/2	1	2
12	1/4000	1/2000	1/1000	1/500	1/250	1/125	1/60	1/30	1/15	1/8	1/4	1/2	1
13	1/8000	1/4000	1/2000	1/1000	1/500	1/250	1/125	1/60	1/30	1/15	1/8	1/4	1/2
14	1/16000	1/8000	1/4000	1/2000	1/1000	1/500	1/250	1/125	1/60	1/30	1/15	1/8	1/4
15	1/32000	1/16000	1/8000	1/4000	1/2000	1/1000	1/500	1/250	1/125	1/60	1/30	1/15	1/8
16		1/32000	1/16000	1/8000	1/4000	1/2000	1/1000	1/500	1/250	1/125	1/60	1/30	1/15
17			1/32000	1/16000	1/8000	1/4000	1/2000	1/1000	1/500	1/250	1/125	1/60	1/30
18				1/32000	1/16000	1/8000	1/4000	1/2000	1/1000	1/500	1/250	1/125	1/60
19					1/32000	1/16000	1/8000	1/4000	1/2000	1/1000	1/500	1/250	1/125
20						1/32000	1/16000	1/8000	1/4000	1/2000	1/1000	1/500	1/250
21							1/32000	1/16000	1/8000	1/4000	1/2000	1/1000	1/500
EV	1.0	1.4	2.0	2.8	4.0	5.6	8.0	11	16	22	32	45	64
EV	f-number												

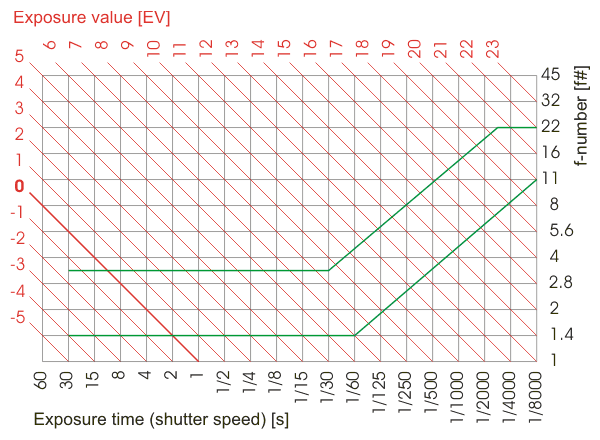
Popular exposure chart type, showing exposure values EV (red lines) as combinations of aperture and shutter speed values. The green lines are sample program lines, by which a digital camera automatically selects both the shutter speed and the aperture for given exposure value (brightness of light), when set to Program mode (P).

== Relationship of EV to lighting conditions ==
"Correct" exposure is obtained when the f-number and exposure time match those "recommended" for given lighting conditions and ISO speed; the relationship is given by the exposure equation prescribed by ISO 2720:1974:

$$\frac {N^2} {t} = \frac {L S} {K} \,,$$

where (Note: Symbols for the quantities in the exposure equation have varied over time; the symbols used in this article reflect current practice for many authors, such as Ray (2000).)

- N is the relative aperture (f-number);
- t is the exposure time ("shutter speed") in seconds;
- L is the average scene luminance in candela per square meter (cd/m^{2});
- S is the ISO arithmetic speed;
- K is the reflected-light meter calibration constant;

Applied to the right-hand side of the exposure equation, exposure value is

$$\mathrm {EV} = \log_2 {\frac {L S} {K} } \,.$$

If the common value of K = 12.5 cd·s/m^{2}/ISO is used, an EV of zero (e.g., an aperture of f/1 and a shutter time of 1 s) for ISO = 100 corresponds to a luminance of 0.125 cd/m^{2} (0.01 cd/ft^{2}). At EV = 15 (the "sunny sixteen" amount of light) the luminance is 4096 cd/m^{2} (380 cd/ft^{2}).

Camera settings also can be determined from incident-light measurements, for which the exposure equation is

$$\frac {N^2} {t} = \frac {E S} {C} \,,$$
where

- E is the illuminance in lux or lumens per square meter; and
- C is the incident-light meter calibration constant.

In terms of exposure value, the right-hand side becomes

$$\mathrm {EV} = \log_2 {\frac {E S} {C} } \,.$$

When applied to the left-hand side of the exposure equation, EV denotes actual combinations of camera settings; when applied to the right-hand side, EV denotes combinations of camera settings required to give the nominally "correct" exposure. The formal relationship of EV to luminance or illuminance has limitations. Although it usually works well for typical outdoor scenes in daylight, it is less applicable to scenes with highly atypical luminance distributions, such as city skylines at night. In such situations, the EV that will result in the best picture often is better determined by subjective evaluation of photographs than by formal consideration of luminance or illuminance.

For a given luminance and film speed, a greater EV results in less exposure, and for fixed exposure (i.e., fixed camera settings), a greater EV corresponds to greater luminance or illuminance.

Illuminance is measured using a flat sensor; if the common value of C = 250 lux·s·ISO (lm·s/m^{2}·ISO) is used, an EV of zero (e.g., an aperture of f/1 and a shutter time of 1 s) for ISO = 100 corresponds to an illuminance of 2.5 lux (0.23 foot-candles). At EV = 15 (the "sunny sixteen" amount of light) the illuminance is 82,000 lux (7600 fc). For general photography, incident-light measurements are usually taken with a hemispherical sensor; the readings cannot be meaningfully related to illuminance.

== Tabulated exposure values ==
An exposure meter may not always be available, and using a meter to determine exposure for some scenes with unusual lighting distribution may be difficult. (Note: Appendix C of ANSI PH3.49-1971 noted this possibility "when the background luminance within the field is radically different from the subject luminance", and further stated "In this kind of scene, a meter reading of the integrated luminance (B_{a}) of the whole scene may not lead to the best picture.") However, natural light, as well as many scenes with artificial lighting, is predictable, so that exposure often can be determined with reasonable accuracy from tabulated values.

Visualization of lighting conditions and corresponding exposure values, where the area of each circle is proportional to the amount of light in the scene. Note that each level includes the full area inside the circle, not merely the ring.

Table 2: Exposure values (ISO 100) for various lighting conditions (Note: Exposure values in Table 2 are taken from ANSI exposure guides PH2.7-1973 and PH2.7-1986. Where the two guides differ, ranges of values have been given or extended. The ANSI guides were derived from studies by Loyd A. Jones and H. R. Condit, described in Jones & Condit (1941), Jones & Condit (1948), and Jones & Condit (1949).)
Lighting condition	EV_{100}
Daylight
Light sand or snow in full or slightly hazy sunlight (distinct shadows) (Note: Values for direct sunlight apply between approximately two hours after sunrise and two hours before sunset, and assume front lighting. As a rough general rule, decrease EV by 1 for side lighting, and decrease EV by 2 for back lighting.)	16
Typical scene in full or slightly hazy sunlight (distinct shadows) (Note: This is approximately the value given by the sunny 16 rule.)	15
Typical scene in hazy sunlight (soft shadows)	14
Typical scene, cloudy bright (no shadows)	13
Typical scene, heavy overcast	12
Areas in open shade, clear sunlight	12
Outdoor, natural light
Rainbows
Clear sky background	15
Cloudy sky background	14
Sunsets and skylines
Just before sunset	12–14
At sunset	12
Just after sunset	9–11
The Moon, (Note: These values are appropriate for pictures of the Moon taken at night with a long lens or telescope, and will render the Moon as a medium tone. They will not, in general, be suitable for landscape pictures that include the Moon. In a landscape photograph, the Moon typically is near the horizon, where its luminance changes considerably with altitude. Moreover, a landscape photograph usually must take account of the sky and foreground as well as the Moon. Consequently, it is nearly impossible to give a single correct exposure value for such a situation.) altitude > 40°
Full	15
Gibbous	14
Quarter	13
Crescent	12
During eclipse	0 to 3
Moonlight, Moon altitude > 40°
Full	−3 to −2
Gibbous	−4
Quarter	−6
Aurora borealis and australis
Bright	−4 to −3
Medium	−6 to −5
Milky Way galactic center	−11 to −9
Outdoor, artificial light
Neon and other bright signs	9–10
Night sports	9
Fires and burning buildings	9
Bright street scenes	8
Night street scenes and window displays	7–8
Night vehicle traffic	5
Fairs and amusement parks	7
Christmas tree lights	4–5
Floodlit buildings, monuments, and fountains	3–5
Distant views of lighted buildings	2
Indoor, artificial light
Galleries	8–11
Sports events, stage shows, and the like	8–9
Circuses, floodlit	8
Ice shows, floodlit	9
Offices and work areas	7–8
Home interiors	5–7
Christmas tree lights	4–5

Exposure values in Table 2 are reasonable general guidelines, but they should be used with caution. For simplicity, they are rounded to the nearest integer, and they omit numerous considerations described in the ANSI exposure guides from which they are derived. Moreover, they take no account of color shifts or reciprocity failure. Proper use of tabulated exposure values is explained in detail in the ANSI exposure guide.

The exposure values in Table 2 are for ISO 100 speed ("EV_{100}"). For a different ISO speed S, increase the exposure values (decrease the exposures) by the number of exposure steps by which that speed is greater than ISO 100; formally,

$$\mathrm{EV}_{S} = \mathrm{EV}_{100} + \log_2 \frac {S} {100} \,.$$

For example, ISO 400 speed is two steps greater than ISO 100:

$$\begin{align}
\mathrm{EV}_{400} &= \mathrm{EV}_{100} + \log_2 \frac {400} {100} \\
&= \mathrm{EV}_{100} + 2 \,.
\end{align}$$

To photograph outdoor night sports with an ISO 400 imaging medium, search Table 2 for "Night sports" (which has an EV of 9 for ISO 100), and add 2 to get EV_{400} = 11.

For lower ISO speed, decrease the exposure values (increase the exposures) by the number of exposure steps by which the speed is less than ISO 100. For example, ISO 50 speed is one step less than ISO 100:

$$\begin{align}
\mathrm{EV}_{50} &= \mathrm{EV}_{100} + \log_2 \frac {50} {100} \\
&= \mathrm{EV}_{100} - 1 \,.
\end{align}$$

To photograph a rainbow against a cloudy sky with an ISO 50–speed imaging medium, search Table 2 for "Rainbows-Cloudy sky background" (which has an EV of 14), and subtract 1 to get EV_{50} = 13.

The equation for correcting for ISO speed can also be solved for EV_{100}:

$$\mathrm{EV}_{100} = \mathrm{EV}_{S} - \log_2 \frac {S} {100} \,.$$

For example, using ISO 400 film and setting the camera for EV 11 allows shooting night sports at a light level of EV_{100} = 9, in agreement with the example done the other way around above.

== Setting EV on a camera ==
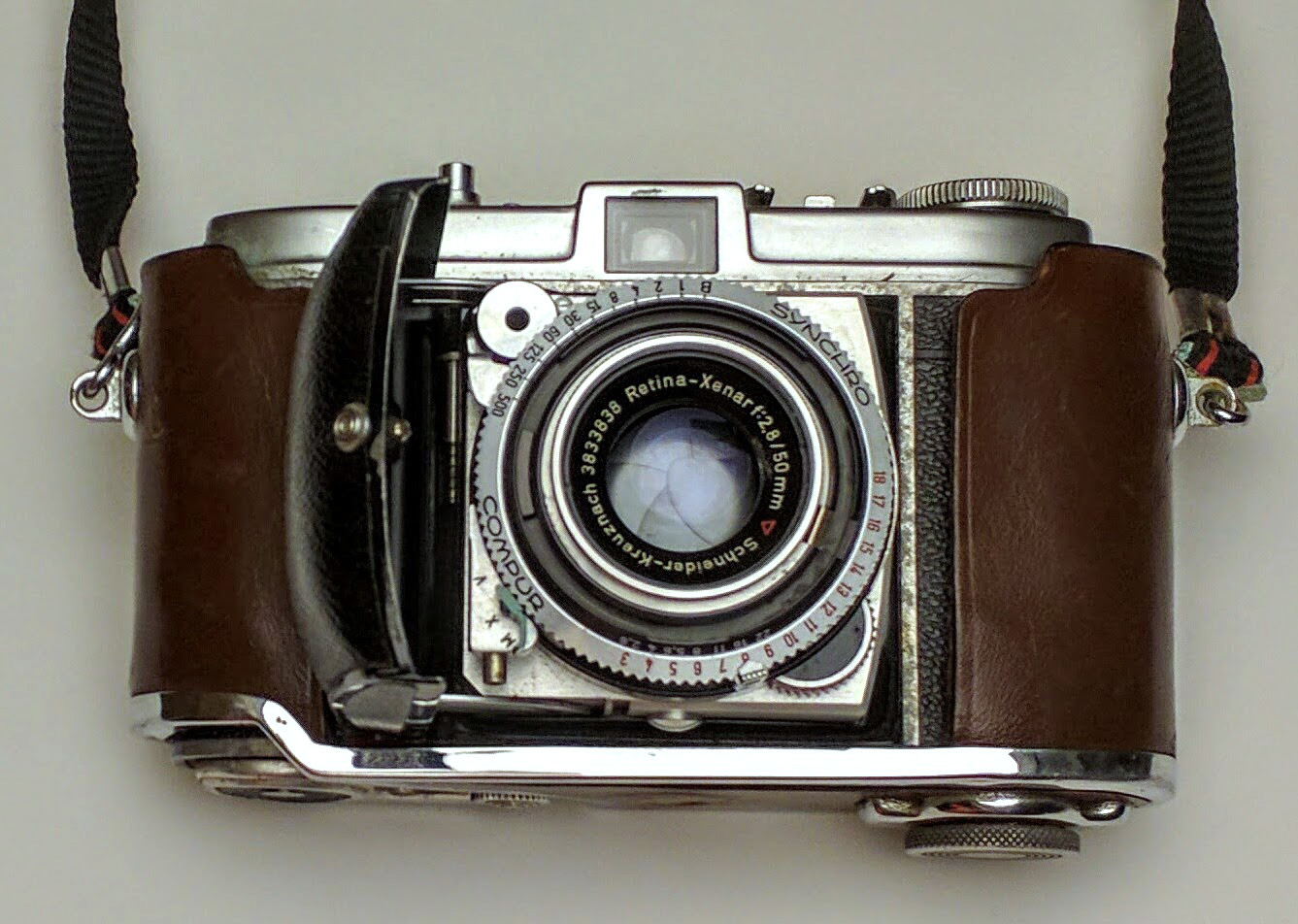
Detail of front of Kodak Retina Ib 35 mm camera (c. 1954) showing the EV setting ring that couples aperture and shutter speed settings

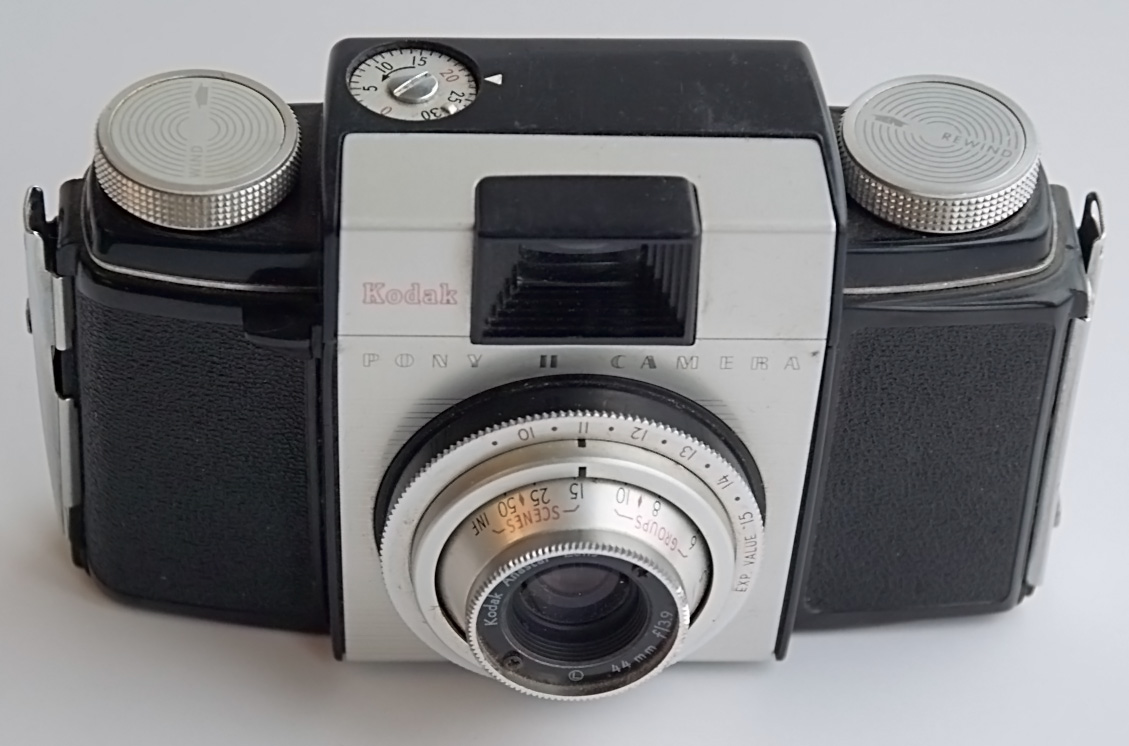
A Kodak Pony II camera (1957–1962) with exposure value setting ring. This camera has a fixed shutter speed, so the "EXP VALUE" ring simply sets the aperture.

On most cameras, there is no direct way to transfer an EV to camera settings; however, a few cameras, such as some Voigtländer and Braun models or the Kodak Pony II shown in the photo, allowed direct setting of exposure value.

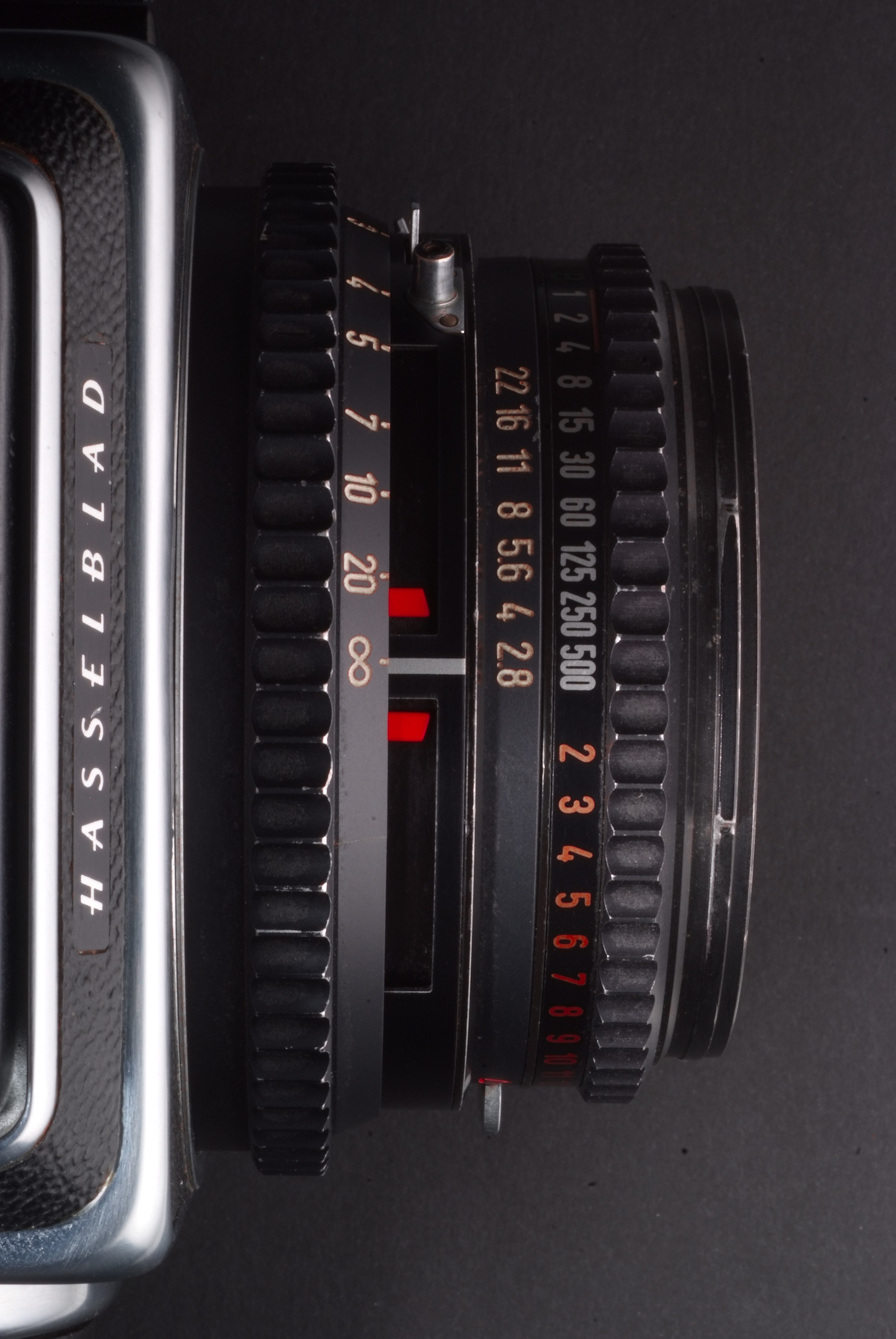
Hasselblad Planar 80 mm with EVS set at EV 12

Some medium-format cameras from Rollei (Rolleiflex, Rolleicord models) and Hasselblad allowed EV to be set on the lenses. The set EV could be locked, coupling shutter and aperture settings, such that adjusting either the shutter speed or aperture made a corresponding adjustment in the other to maintain a constant exposure. On some lenses the locking was optional, so that the photographer could choose the preferred method of working depending on the situation. Regarding use of EV on some meters and cameras, Ansel Adams noted that in some cases, the EV indication from the meter may need to be adjusted for film speed.

== Exposure compensation in EV ==
Many current cameras allow for exposure compensation, and usually state it in terms of EV. In this context, EV refers to the difference between the indicated and set exposures. For example, an exposure compensation of +1 EV (or +1 step) means to increase exposure, by using either a longer exposure time or a smaller f-number.

The sense of exposure compensation is opposite that of the EV scale itself. An increase in exposure corresponds to a decrease in EV, so an exposure compensation of +1 EV results in a smaller EV; conversely, an exposure compensation of −1 EV results in a greater EV. For example, if a meter reading of a lighter-than-normal subject indicates EV 16, and an exposure compensation of +1 EV is applied to render the subject appropriately, the final camera settings will correspond to EV 15.

== Meter indication in EV ==
Some light meters (e.g., Pentax spot meters) indicate directly in EV at ISO 100. Some other meters, especially digital models, can indicate EV for the selected ISO speed. In most cases, this difference is irrelevant; with the Pentax meters, camera settings usually are determined using the exposure calculator, and most digital meters directly display shutter speeds and f-numbers.

Recently, articles on many web sites have used light value (LV) to denote EV at ISO 100. However, this term does not derive from a standards body, and has had several conflicting definitions.

== EV and APEX ==
The Additive system of Photographic EXposure (APEX) proposed in the 1960 ASA standard for monochrome film speed, extended the concept of exposure value to all quantities in the exposure equation by taking base-2 logarithms, reducing application of the equation to simple addition and subtraction.

In terms of exposure value, the left-hand side of the exposure equation becomes

$$E_v = A_v + T_v \,.$$

The aperture value A_{v}, and time value T_{v} are defined as:

$$\begin{align}
A_v &= \log_2{A^2} = 2\log_2{A} \\
T_v &= \log_2{1\over T} = -\log_2{T} \,,
\end{align}$$

where:

- A is the relative aperture (f-number); and
- T the exposure time ("shutter speed") in seconds.

A_{v} and T_{v} represent the numbers of stops from f/1 and 1 second, respectively.

Use of APEX required logarithmic markings on aperture and shutter controls, however, and these never were incorporated in consumer cameras. With the inclusion of built-in exposure meters in most cameras shortly after APEX was proposed, the need to use the exposure equation was eliminated, and APEX saw little actual use.

APEX has seen a partial resurrection in the Exif standard, which calls for storing exposure data using APEX values.

== EV as a measure of luminance and illuminance ==
For a given ISO speed and meter calibration constant, there is a direct relationship between exposure value and luminance (or illuminance). Strictly, EV is not a measure of luminance or illuminance; rather, an EV corresponds to a luminance (or illuminance) for which a camera with a given ISO speed would use the indicated EV to obtain the nominally correct exposure. Nonetheless, it is common practice among photographic equipment manufacturers to express luminance in EV for ISO 100 speed, as when specifying metering range or autofocus sensitivity. (Note: The practice of expressing luminance in EV for ISO 100 is long established; Ray (2002), p. 592 cites Ulffers (1968) as an early example.) Properly, the meter calibration constant as well as the ISO speed should be stated, but this seldom is done.

Values for the reflected-light calibration constant K vary slightly among manufacturers; a common choice is 12.5 (Canon, Nikon, and Sekonic. Using K = 12.5, the relationship between EV at ISO 100 and luminance L is then

$$L = 2^{\mathrm{EV} - 3} \, {\mathrm{cd} \over \mathrm{m}^2}.$$

Values of luminance at various values of EV based on this relationship are shown in Table 3. Using this relationship, a reflected-light exposure meter that indicates in EV can be used to determine luminance.

Exposure value vs. Luminance (ISO 100, K = 12.5) and Illuminance (ISO 100, C = 250)
EV_{100}	Luminance		Illuminance	
EV_{100}	cd/m^{2}	fL	lx	fc
−4	0.008	0.0023	0.156	0.015
−3	0.016	0.0046	0.313	0.029
−2	0.031	0.0091	0.625	0.058
−1	0.063	0.018	1.25	0.116
0	0.125	0.036	2.5	0.232
1	0.25	0.073	5	0.465
2	0.5	0.146	10	0.929
3	1	0.292	20	1.86
4	2	0.584	40	3.72
5	4	1.17	80	7.43
6	8	2.33	160	14.9
7	16	4.67	320	29.7
8	32	9.34	640	59.5
9	64	18.7	1280	119
10	128	37.4	2560	238
11	256	74.7	5120	476
12	512	149	10,240	951
13	1024	299	20,480	1903
14	2048	598	40,960	3805
15	4096	1195	81,920	7611
16	8192	2391	163,840	15,221

As with luminance, common practice among photographic equipment manufacturers is to express illuminance in EV for ISO 100 speed when specifying metering range. (Note: The metering range for an incident-light meter specified in EV at ISO 100 usually applies to a hemispherical sensor, so strictly speaking, it does not directly relate to illuminance.)

The situation with incident-light meters is more complicated than that for reflected-light meters, because the calibration constant C depends on the sensor type. Two sensor types are common: flat (cosine-responding) and hemispherical (cardioid-responding). Illuminance is measured with a flat sensor; a typical value for C is 250 with illuminance in lux. Using C = 250, the relationship between EV at ISO 100 and illuminance E is then

$$E = 2.5 \times 2^{\mathrm {EV}} \, \mathrm{lx}.$$

Values of illuminance at various values of EV based on this relationship are shown in the table to the right. Using this relationship, an incident-light exposure meter that indicates in EV can be used to determine illuminance.

Although illuminance measurements may indicate appropriate exposure for a flat subject, they are less useful for a typical scene in which many elements are not flat and are at various orientations to the camera. For determining practical photographic exposure, a hemispherical sensor has proven more effective. With a hemispherical sensor, typical values for C are between 320 (Minolta) and 340 (Sekonic) with illuminance in lux. If illuminance is interpreted loosely, measurements with a hemispherical sensor indicate "scene illuminance".

== See also ==
- APEX system
- Exposure compensation
- Exposure meter calibration
- High-dynamic-range imaging
