= Light value =

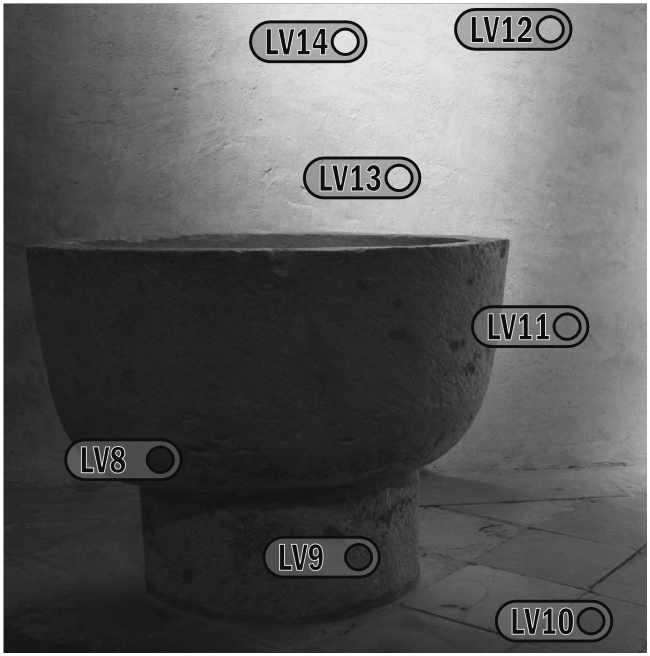
Light Values on picture

In photography, light value has been used to refer to a "light level" for either incident or reflected light, often on a base-2 logarithmic scale. The term does not derive from a published standard, and has had several different meanings:

1. An arbitrary value indicated by an exposure meter such as the Weston Master V, discussed in Adams (1948, 14–18). This may have been the origin of the term. The indicated light value was transferred to the meter's exposure calculator, which then was used to determine camera settings. Ray (2000) uses the term, with the acronym 'LV', in this sense. The Honeywell/Pentax 1°/21° spot meter indicated in "light level" ("LL"), with LL essentially exposure value (EV) for ISO 100 film speed. The later Pentax Spotmeter V and Digital Spotmeter indicated directly in EV for ISO 100, but they made no mention of "light level", "light value", or LV.
2. A synonym for incident light value, from the Additive system of Photographic EXposure (APEX). Zakia and Stroebel (1993) and Stroebel, Compton, Current, and Zakia (2000) used the term in this sense. They used the APEX symbol $B_v$, normally used for luminance value.
3. An apparent synonym for luminance value, from APEX. Stroebel, Compton, Current, and Zakia (2000) referred to "scene illuminance" in the text of the article, but the example used units of luminance. The defining equation used the symbol $L_v$. The table at the end of the article used units of illuminance and the symbol $B_v$, as noted above.
4. A synonym for exposure value (EV) (e.g., Kyoritsu calibrated light sources, for which the luminance ranges are specified in terms of "LV at ISO 100". Kyoritsu specify the luminance ranges of their multi-function camera testers in EV, presumably at ISO 100).
5. A synonym for "EV at ISO 100 film speed". This usage appears on many web pages, usually without attribution of an authoritative source. Eads (2000) proposed a revised APEX in which luminance value was equal to EV for ISO 100 speed, but he did not use the term light value.
6. Literally speaking, the English term light value could be translated as "Lichtwert" in German language, however, this is not what the term Lichtwert, as it was introduced by the German shutter manufacturer Friedrich Deckel in 1954 and defined as Belichtungswert in DIN 19010, is used for in German-speaking countries. Instead, the established term Lichtwert (abbreviated as "LW") describes what became known as exposure value (EV) elsewhere.

In APEX, luminance value and incident light value are numerically equal, so that for a given "light value", either meaning 2 or 3 would result in the same camera settings.

== See also ==
- APEX system
- Exposure value
- Sunny 16 rule
