= Canon A series =

Canon’s A series is Canon's amateur series of manual focus 35 mm single lens reflex cameras. The first camera, the AE-1, was introduced in April 1976 while the final camera, the AL-1, was released in March 1982. All have a Canon FD lens mount compatible with Canon's extensive range of manual-focus lenses.

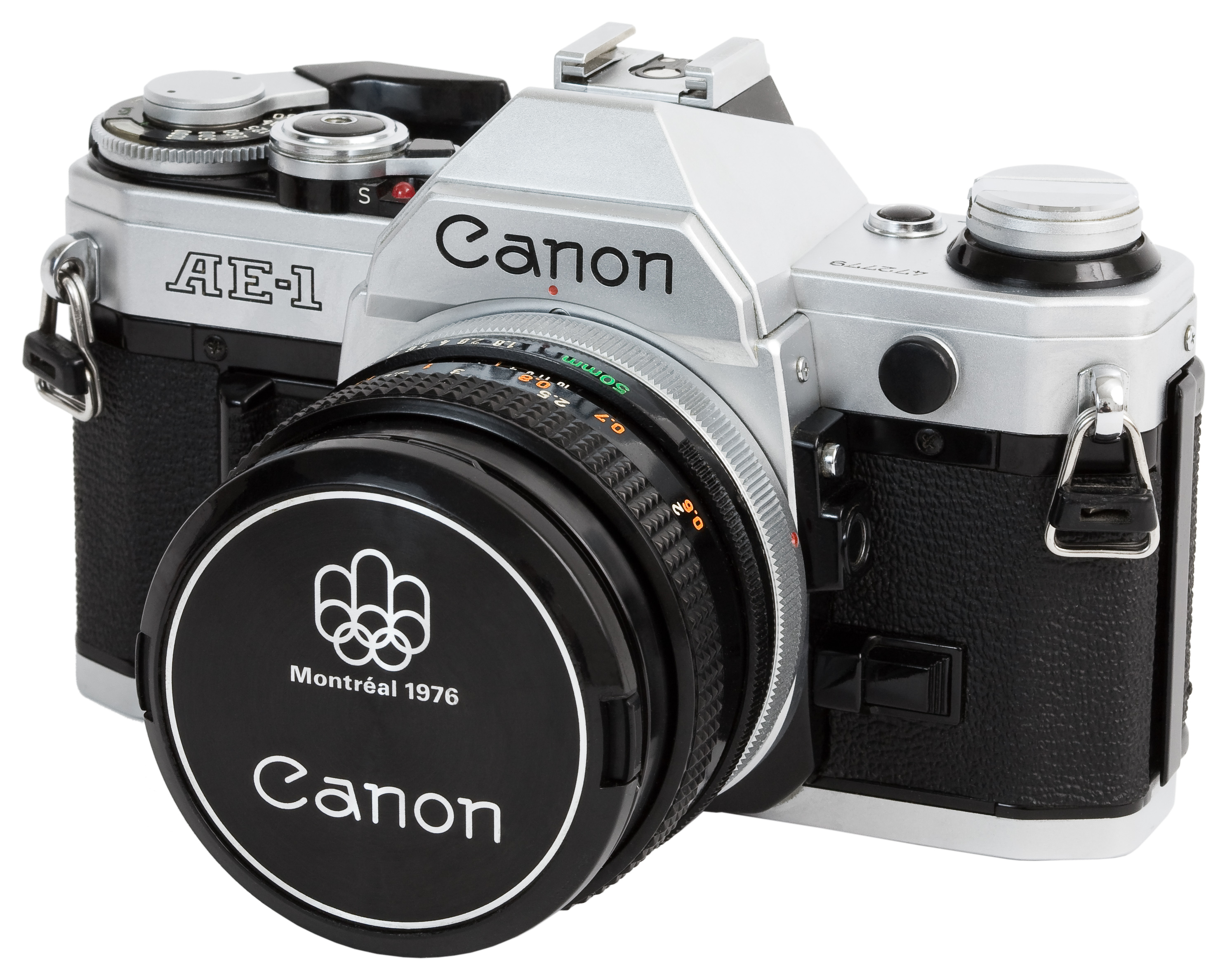
Canon AE-1 with 50mm f1.8 S.C. II

- Canon AE-1 (April 1976)
- Canon AT-1 (December 1976)
- Canon A-1 (April 1978)
- Canon AV-1 (May 1979)
- Canon AE-1 Program (April 1981)
- Canon AL-1 (March 1982)

	1971	1972	1973	1974	1975	1976	1977	1978	1979	1980	1981	1982	1983	1984	1985	1986	1987	1988	1989	1990	1991	1992	1993
Professional																T90							
Professional		F-1 High Speed Motor Drive Camera												New F-1 High Speed Motor Drive Camera									
Professional	F-1						F-1N / F-1 (Later Model)					New F-1											
Amateur				EF					A-1														
Amateur															T70								
Amateur	FTb			FTb-N			AE-1					AE-1 Program											
Amateur					TLb					AV-1			AL-1			T80							
Amateur					TX		AT-1							T50							T60		
