= Brice Gelot =

French photographer

- Born: Brice Gelot; 1985 (age 40–41); Dijon, France
- Other name: NSD51/50
- Occupations: Photographer, visual artist
- Years active: 2004 - present
- Known for: Street photography Documentary photography
- Notable work: Brice Gelot Archives Vol.1; Straight Out of the Hood; For the Love of God

Brice Gelot (born 1985) is a French street and documentary photographer based in Dijon, France.

== Biography ==
Gelot was born in 1985, in Dijon, France. He began his photographic career in 2004 with a Canon A-1 film camera, initially documenting skateboarding culture. He later worked professionally within the industry, contributing to various projects. He is a self-taught artist known for his black-and-white documentary photography of urban communities, religious expressions and street culture. Gelot's documentary work focuses on urban subcultures and social issues, including tattoo culture, homelessness and marginalized communities. His methodology involves extended immersion in the environments he photographs. He primarily works with black and white film photography to document these subjects.

In 2022, Gelot presented For the Love of God, a documentary project examining religious practices in contemporary society. The series documents Catholic religious expressions through photographs of tattoos, statues, icons and street shrines. For the Love of God received positive acclaim from various news outlets. In 2023, Gelot published Brice Gelot Archives Vol. 1, a collection of his notable works. The publication has been recognized for its focus on narrative structure and emotional depth, representing a significant point in his career and his contributions to contemporary street photography.

One of Gelot's notable works is Straight out the Hood, a long-term documentary project that focuses on urban areas, especially poor neighborhoods and underserved communities. The project examines the influence of criminal organizations, such as the Camorra in Italy and local gangs in Los Angeles, and how they affect these disadvantaged areas. Through his photography, Gelot captures the challenges these communities face, highlighting their social and economic struggles. He has described this work as a key focus of his career, aiming to show the history and culture of urban areas beyond typical depictions. Straight out the hood series earned Gelot the Best Selected Photographer award at the Hamburg Portfolio Review and third prize at the World Masters of Photography in 2024. He also received third prize in the AAP Magazine 36 for the same series in 2023.

Gelot's work has been included in exhibitions such as Art Basel in Miami, the Biennale Artbox Expo in Venice, and the Glasgow Gallery of Photography. His photography has also been featured in publications including Vice and LensCulture, contributing to his recognition in the international photography community.
