= Canon AE-1 =

35 mm film single-lens reflex camera

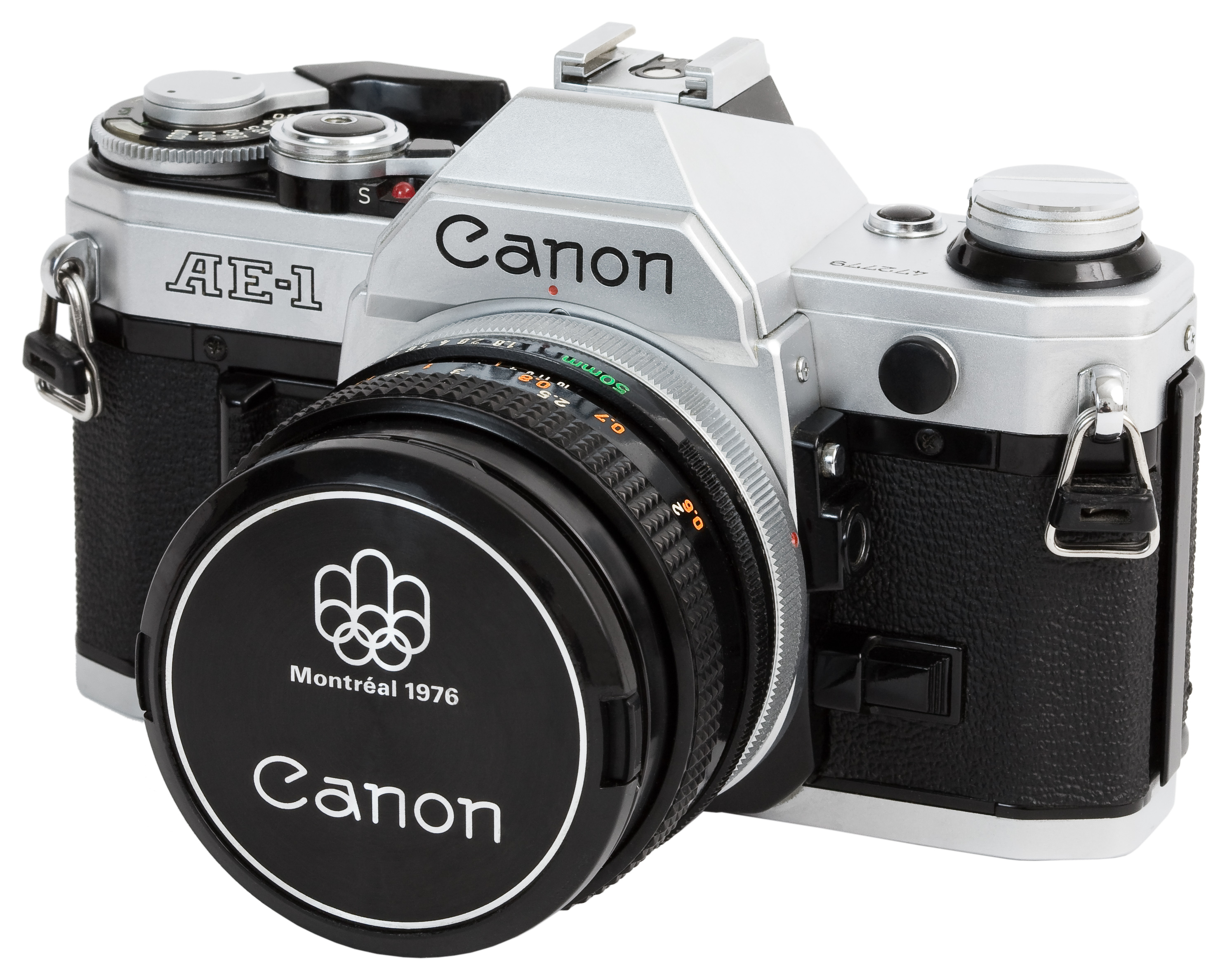

Overview
- Maker: Canon Camera K. K.
- Type: 35 mm SLR
- Released: 1976
- Production: 1976-1984

Lens
- Lens mount: Canon FD

Sensor/medium
- Film speed: ISO 25 to 3200 [manual]
- Recording medium: 135 film

Focusing
- Focus: Manual

Exposure/metering
- Exposure: Shutter priority, manual
- Exposure metering: EV1 to EV18 @ ASA 100

Flash
- Flash: Hot shoe, PC socket
- Flash synchronization: 1/60 s

Shutter
- Frame rate: Manual lever winding, unmodified.
- Shutter speed range: 2 s to 1/1000 s

General
- Battery: 4SR44 6 V battery
- Dimensions: 87×141×47.5 mm (3.43×5.55×1.87 in)
- Weight: 590 g (21 oz)
- Made in: Japan

Chronology
- Successor: Canon AE-1 Program

The Canon AE-1 is a 35 mm single-lens reflex (SLR) film camera for use with interchangeable lenses, manufactured by Canon Camera K. K. (today Canon Incorporated) in Japan from April 1976 to 1984. It uses an electromagnetically controlled, horizontal cloth focal plane shutter, with a speed range of 2 to 1/1000 second plus Bulb and flash X-sync of 1/60 second. The camera body is 87 mm tall, 141 mm wide, and 48 mm deep; it weighs 590 g. Most are silver, with black grip and chrome trim, but some are black with chrome trim.

Its name refers to the fact that it is an electronic camera using aperture control for automatic exposure. The AE-1 is the first SLR containing a digital integrated circuit, which allowed Canon to integrate more functionality while making the camera smaller.

== Features ==
The AE-1 has a Canon FD breech-lock lens mount and accepts any FD or New FD (FDn) lens. It is not compatible with Canon's later Canon EF lens mount, though adapters made by independent manufacturers can be found. The camera will also accept Canon's earlier FL-mount lenses through the use of stop-down metering. Original FD lenses, introduced in 1971, do not rotate in the mounting process; instead, a locking ring at the base is turned to attach the lens. This was often criticized as being slower than the bayonet mounts of competing cameras. The counter argument, though, was that as the lens/body mating surfaces did not rotate, there was no wear that could affect the critical distance from lens to film plane. In 1979, Canon introduced the New FD series of lenses that rotate the whole outer lens barrel to lock. The inner lens barrel remains stationary, and thus the signal levers and pins still do not rotate. During the late 1970s, over 50 Canon FD lenses were available for purchase. They ranged from a fisheye FD 15 mm f/2.8 SSC to a FD 800 mm f/5.6 SSC, plus special purpose lenses such as a 7.5mm circular fisheye and a 35 mm tilt and shift lens.

Accessories for the AE-1 include the Canon Winder A (motorized single frame film advance up to 2 frames per second), the Canon Databack A (sequential numbering or date stamping on the film), and the Canon Speedlite 155A (guide number 56/17 (feet/meters) at ASA 100) and Canon Speedlite 177A (guide number 83/25 (feet/meters) at ASA 100) electronic flashes. The later Power winder A2 is also compatible, but the Motor Drive MA is not.

The AE-1 is a battery-powered microprocessor-controlled manual focus SLR. It supports either manual exposure control or shutter priority auto exposure. The exposure control system consists of a needle pointing along a vertical f-stop scale on the right side of the viewfinder to indicate the readings of the built-in light meter (center-weighted with a silicon photocell). The viewfinder used by the AE-1 is Canon's standard split image rangefinder with microprism collar focusing aids. The camera will not function without a battery (one 4LR44 or 4SR44 cell), including the shutter and lightmeter.

== Design history ==
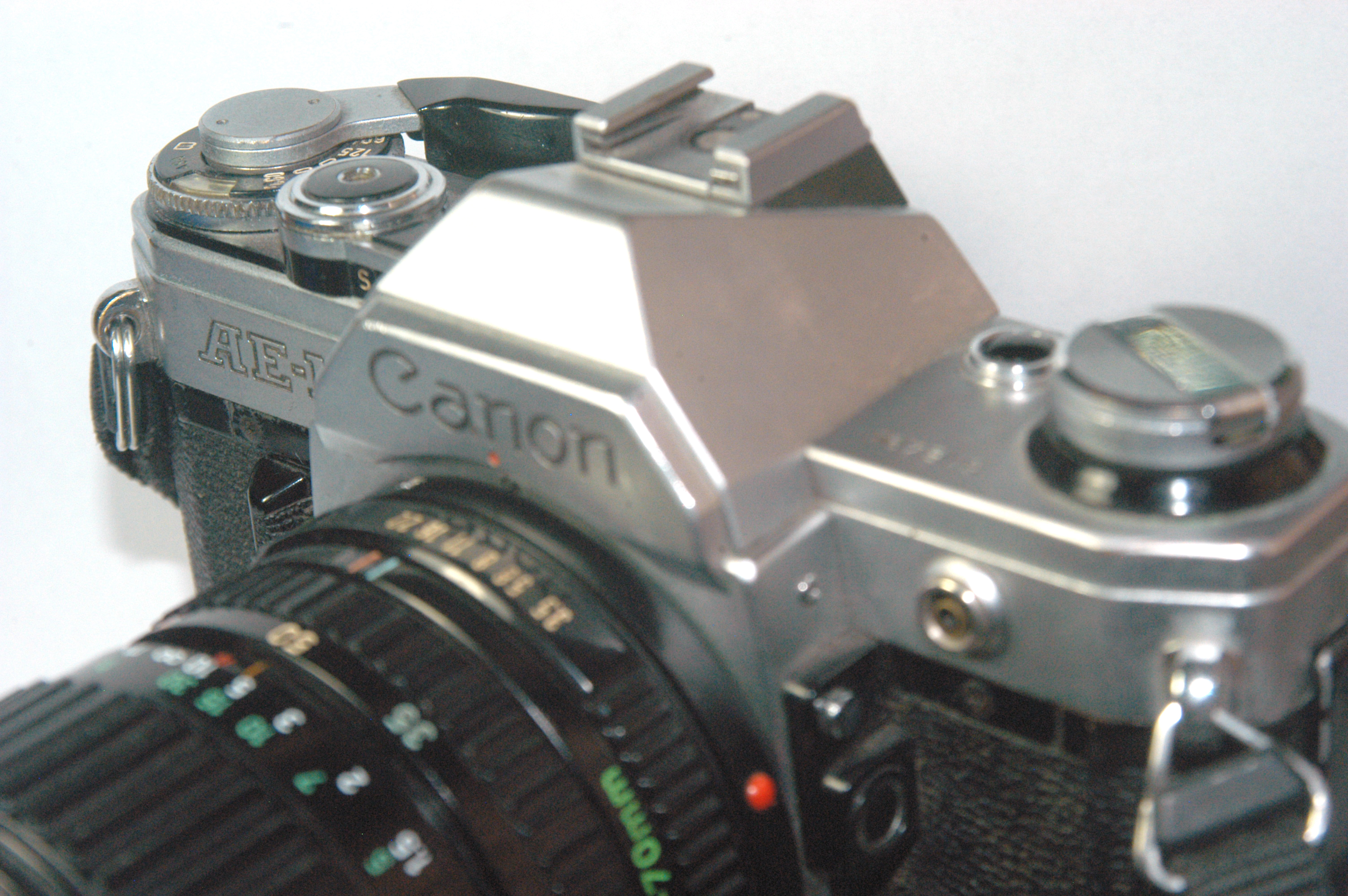
Canon AE-1 detail

The AE-1 was the first in what became a complete overhaul of Canon's line of SLRs. The 1970s and 1980s were an era of intense competition between the major Japanese SLR brands: Canon, Nikon, Minolta, Pentax and Olympus. Between 1975 and 1985, there was a dramatic departure from heavy all-metal manual mechanical camera bodies to much more compact bodies with integrated circuit (IC) electronic automation. In addition, due to rapid advances in electronics, the brands leap-frogged each other with successively more automated models.

Although Canon had been making quality 35 mm cameras for decades, it had since the late 1950s been overshadowed by rival Nippon Kokagu K. K. and its Nikon cameras. While Canon easily led in the amateur compact fixed-lens market (where Nikon did not compete), Canon SLRs did not have the professional features of the top-end Nikon SLRs. Nikon, with its solid reputation for quality of material and workmanship, held a stranglehold on the prestigious professional SLR market that competitors could not break.

The AE-1 was the vanguard of the landmark Canon amateur level A-series SLRs and led Canon's foray into the emerging electronically controlled SLR market. The other members of the A-series were the AT-1 (released 1977), A-1 (1978), AV-1 (1979), AE-1 Program (1981) and AL-1 (1982). They all used the same compact aluminum alloy chassis, but with different feature levels and outer cosmetic plastic top panel. By sharing most major components, including an inexpensive horizontal cloth-curtain shutter, viewfinder information display, and autoflash control, Canon further reduced costs and could undercut the price of the more expensive SLRs then on the market.

In keeping with its cost-cutting philosophy, Canon designed the AE-1 to use a significant amount of structural plastic for a lighter and cheaper camera at the expense of being less impact resistant. Canon went to great effort to disguise the use of plastic—the injection–molded acrylonitrile-butadiene-styrene (ABS) for the top panel finished with either satin chrome or black enameled to give the look and feel of metal. The bottom plate was made of brass and then finished with satin chrome or black enameled. Extensive use of electronics also allowed simpler modular internal construction instead of mechanical linkages. Five major and 25 minor internal modules reduced the individual parts count by over 300. Modular construction, in turn, allowed automated production lines in order to reduce cost. Unfortunately, cost concerns also resulted in the use of plastic in some of the moving and operating mechanisms.

The AE-1 was never designed to be a professional camera; however, it was made to have relatively straightforward controls and automatic aperture for newcomers, with various manual controls and system accessories to appeal to more experienced photographers. The AE-1 was the first SLR purchased by millions of amateur photographers, persuaded by its feature list and low price.

In many ways, the AE-1 represented the confluence of two streams of Canon camera development. The first generation electronically controlled 35 mm SLR Canon EF (1973) merged with the final generation rangefinder Canonet G-III QL17 (1972). After decades of chasing Nikon for Japanese optical supremacy, Canon finally hit upon a formula for success: high technology for ease of use, cheaper internal parts and electronics for lower price, and heavy advertising to get the message out. Despite an outcry from traditionalist photographers who complained about an “excess” of automation ruining the art of photography, automation proved to be the only way to entice most amateur photographers.

The AE-1 had only one pointer needle used to indicate the light meter recommended f-stop, and had neither a follower needle to indicate the actual lens set f-stop, nor plus or minus indicators for over and underexposure. The shutter-priority system of the AE-1 was more suited to sports action than to preserving depth-of-field, yet the 1/1000 s top speed of its horizontally traveling shutter limited its use for such activities. The battery door design was subject to frequent breakage, and over time owners have reported instances of shutter and mechanical gremlins, including mirror linkage wear (the "Canon squeal"). Canon's eventual abandonment of the FD lens mount for the EOS autofocus design also had an effect on prices for the AE-1 on the used market.

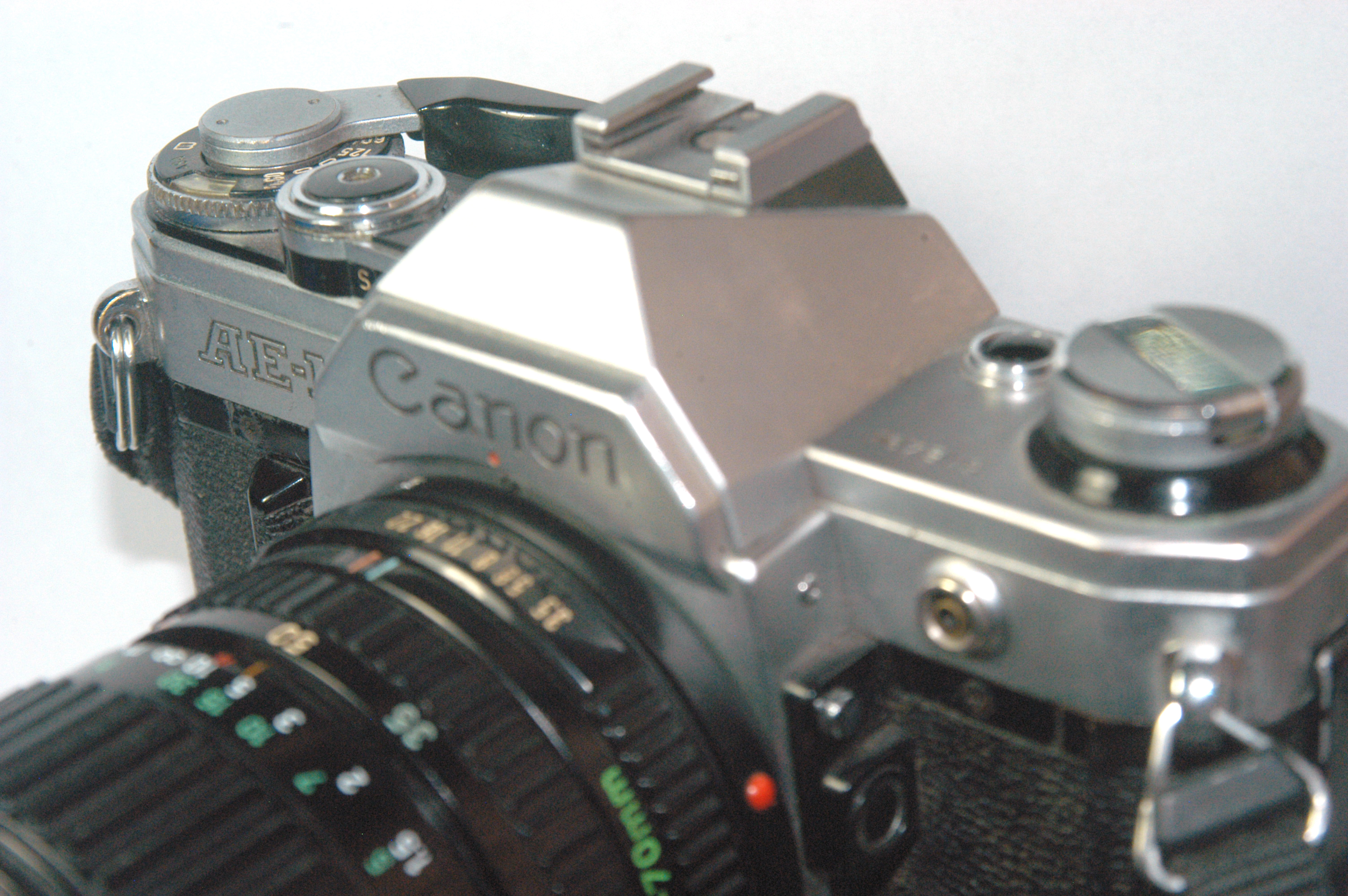
Canon AE-1 in detail, with Canon FD 35-70mm

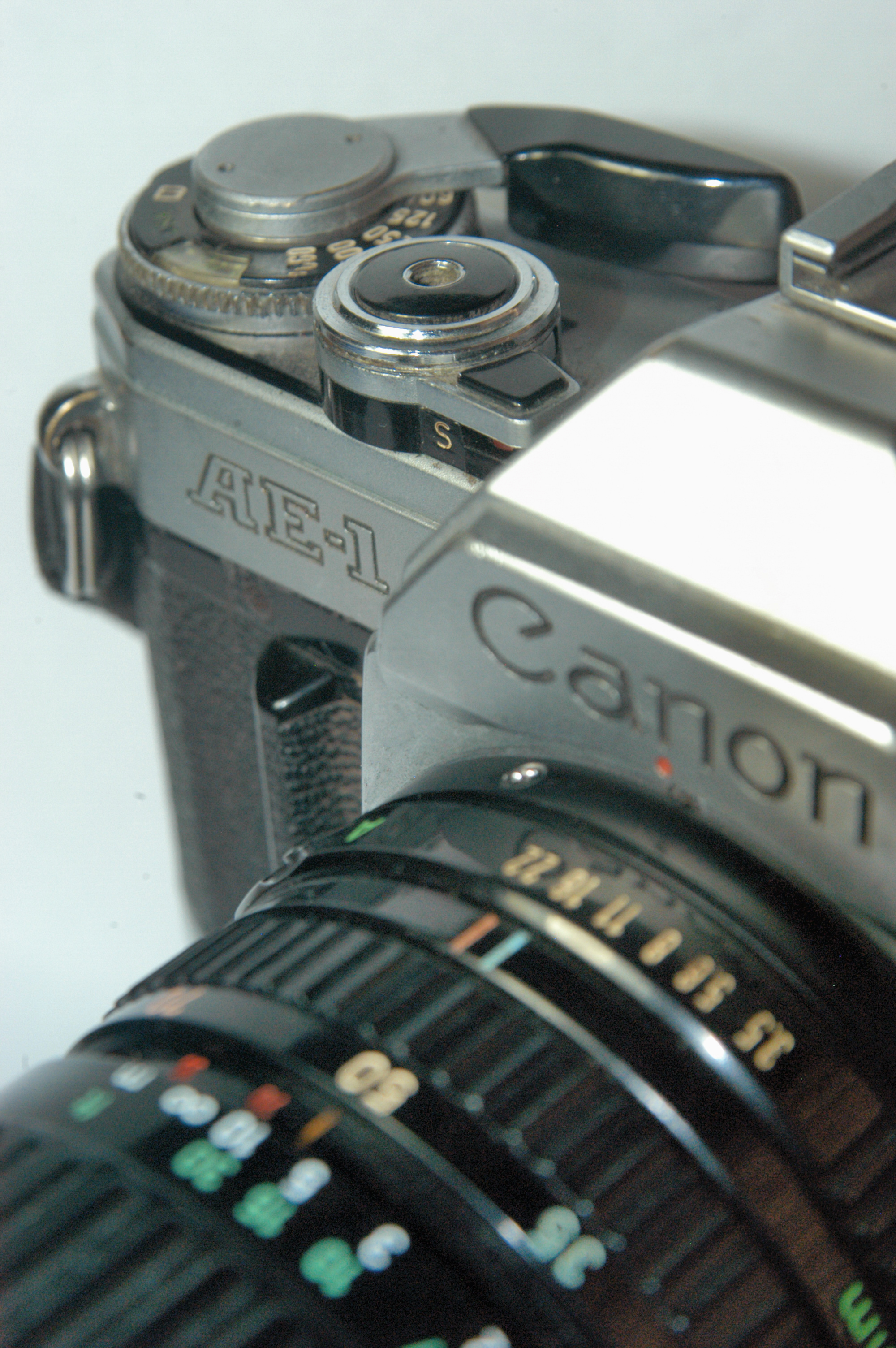
Canon AE-1 in detail

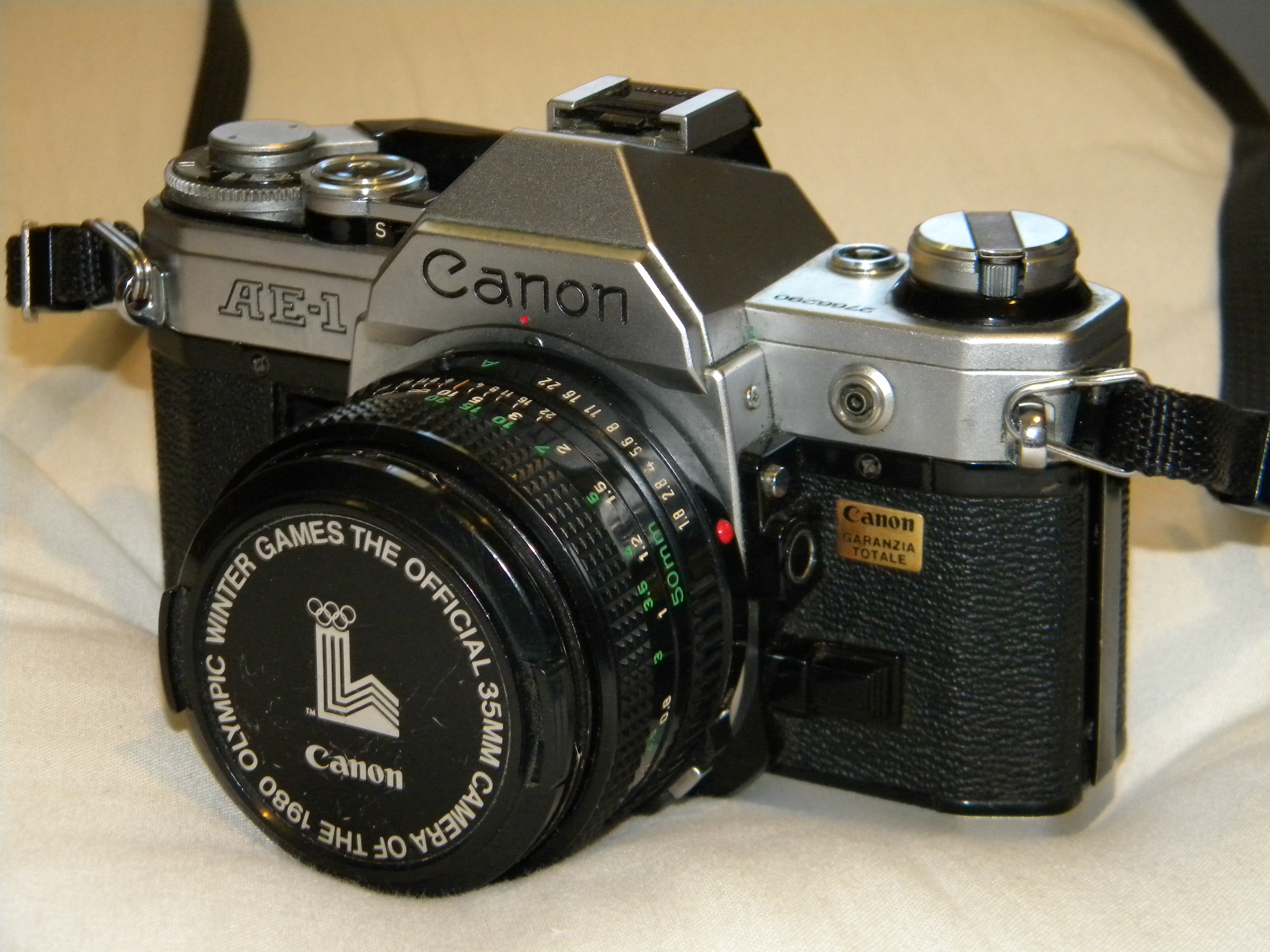
Canon AE-1 with lens cap of the 1980 Olympic Winter Games

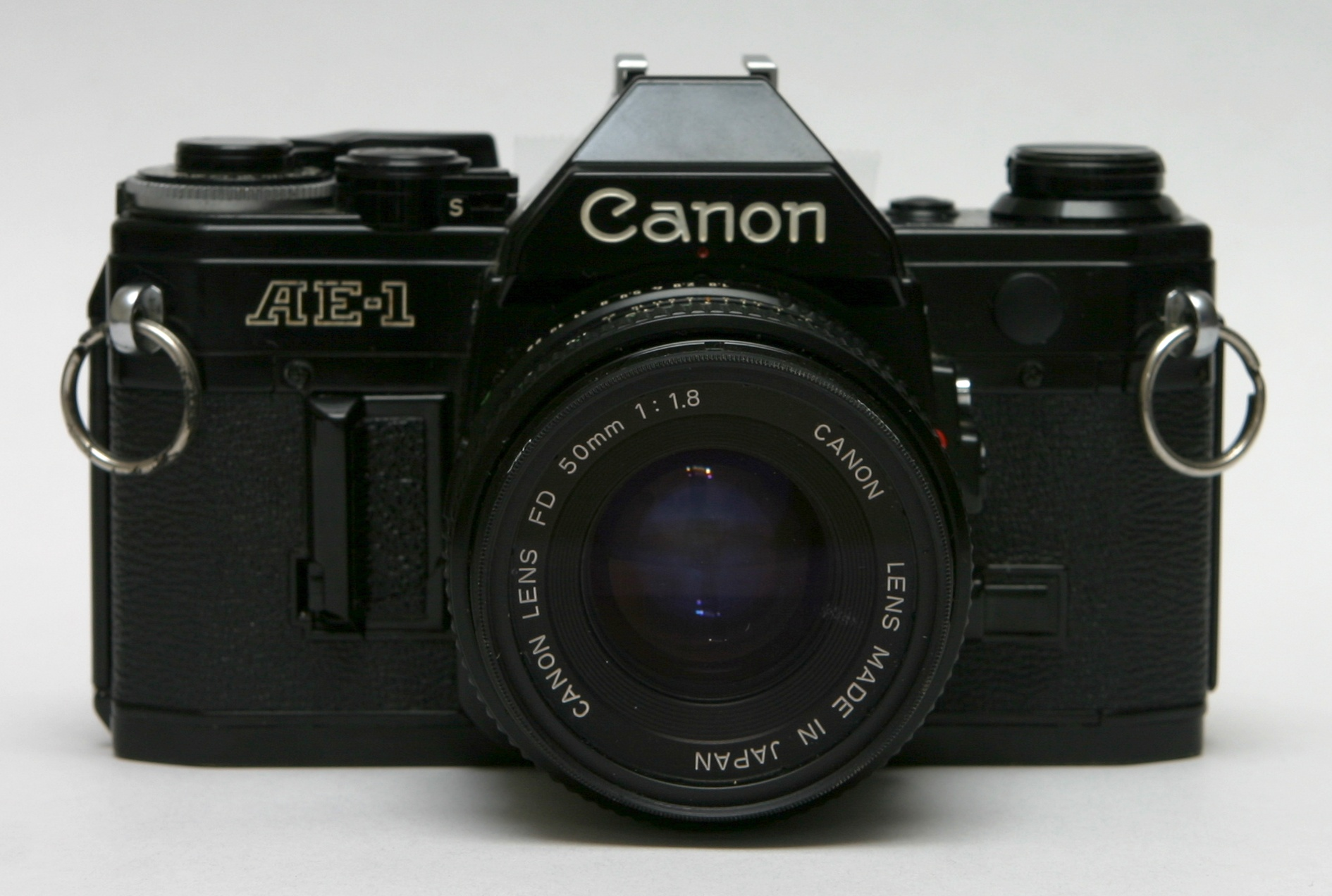
Black model with 50 mm f/1.8

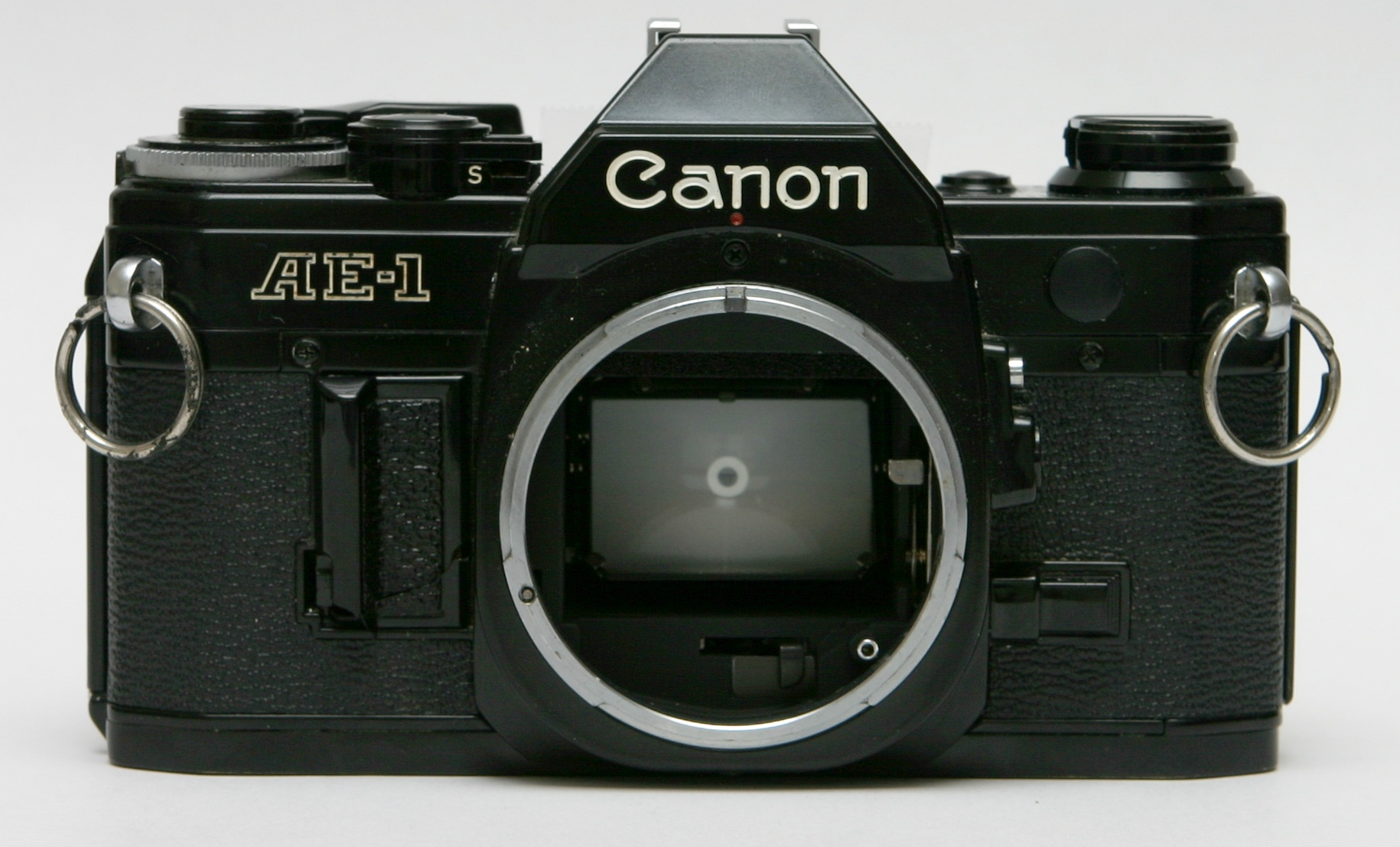
Without lens

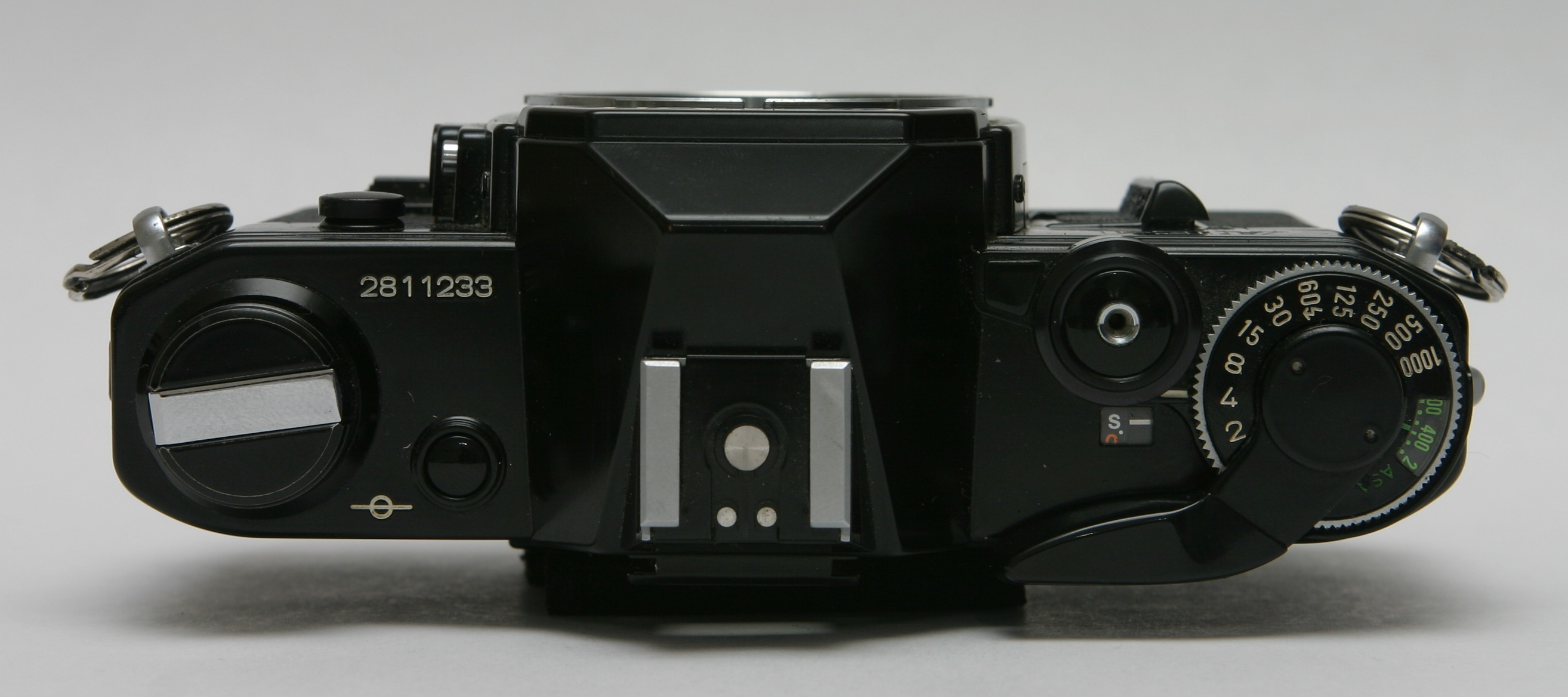
From the top showing controls

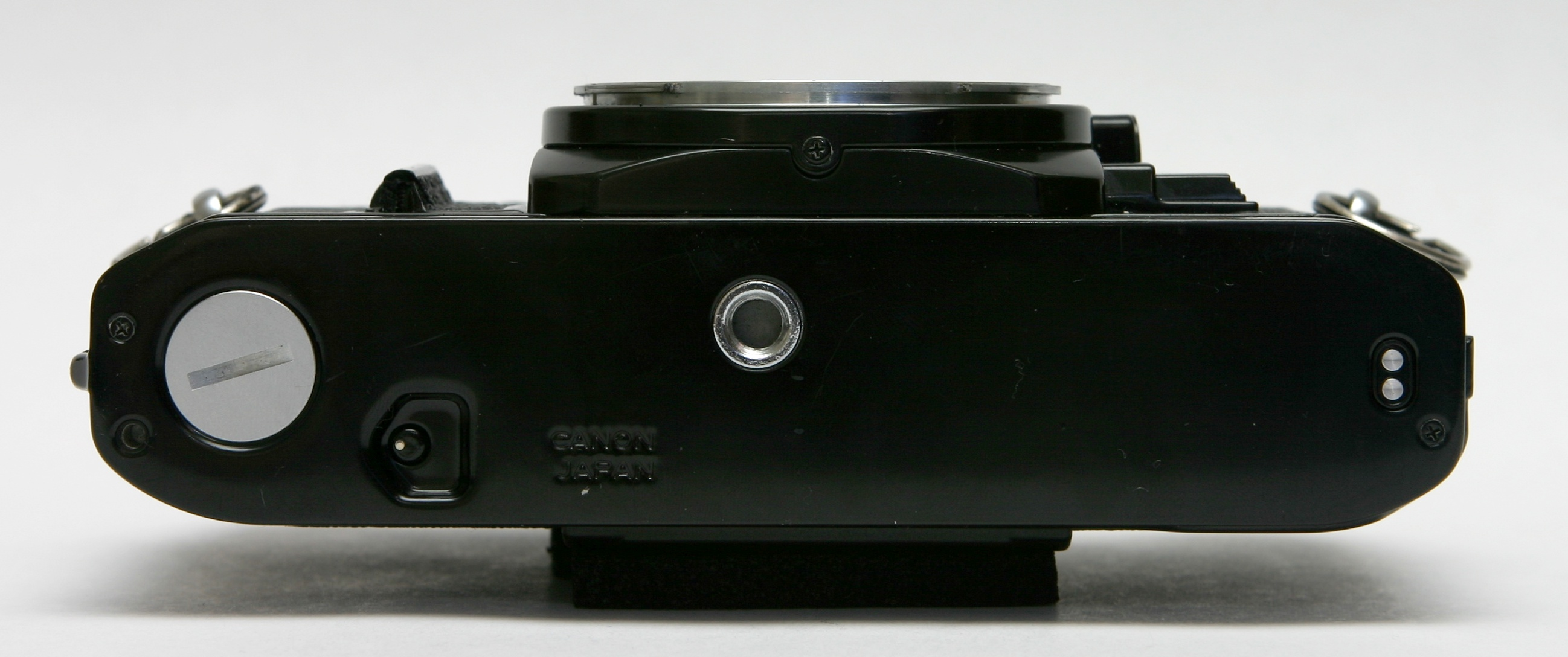
From the bottom with the black rewind button with the small white dot on the bottom left

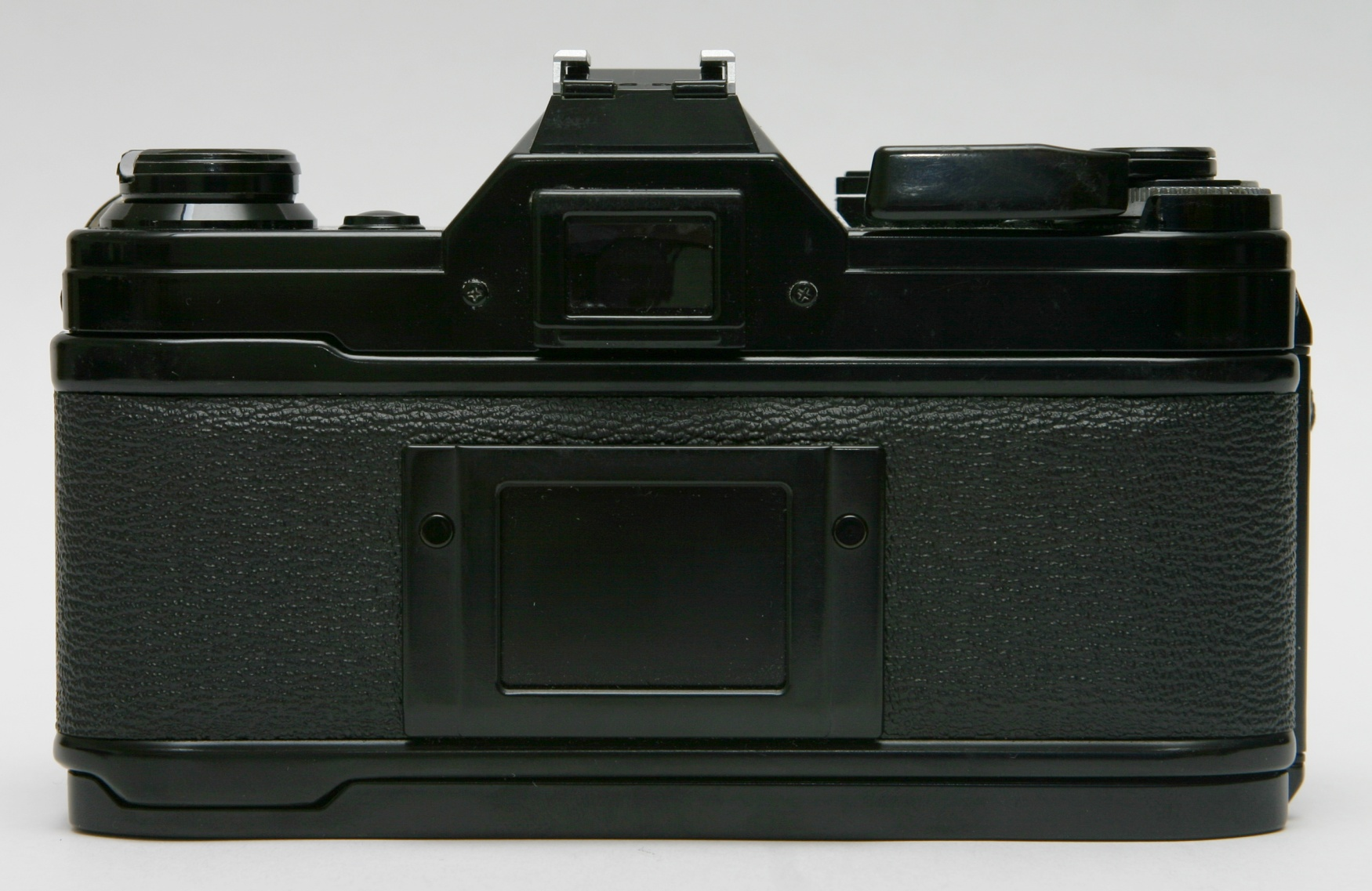
From the back

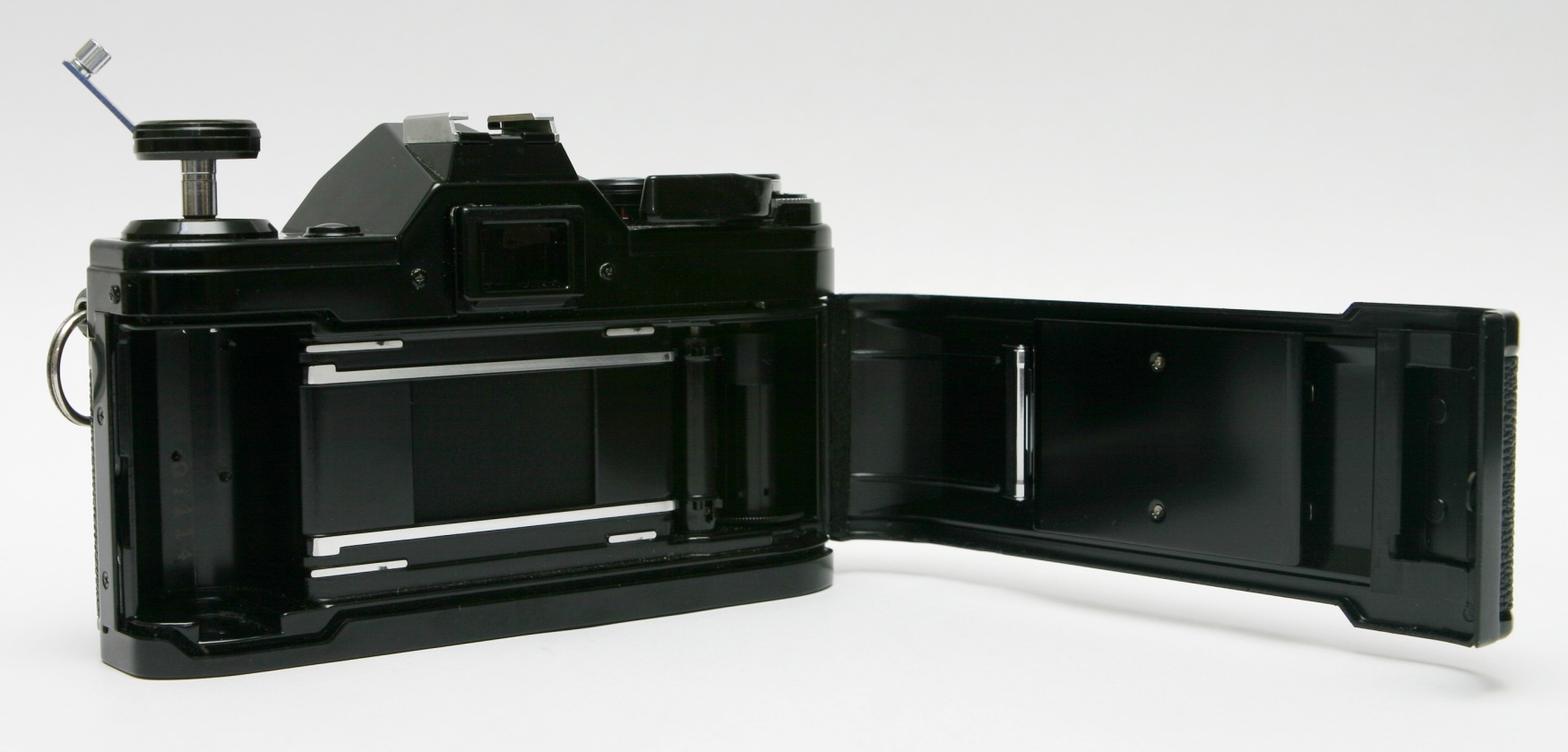
From the back with the film cover open

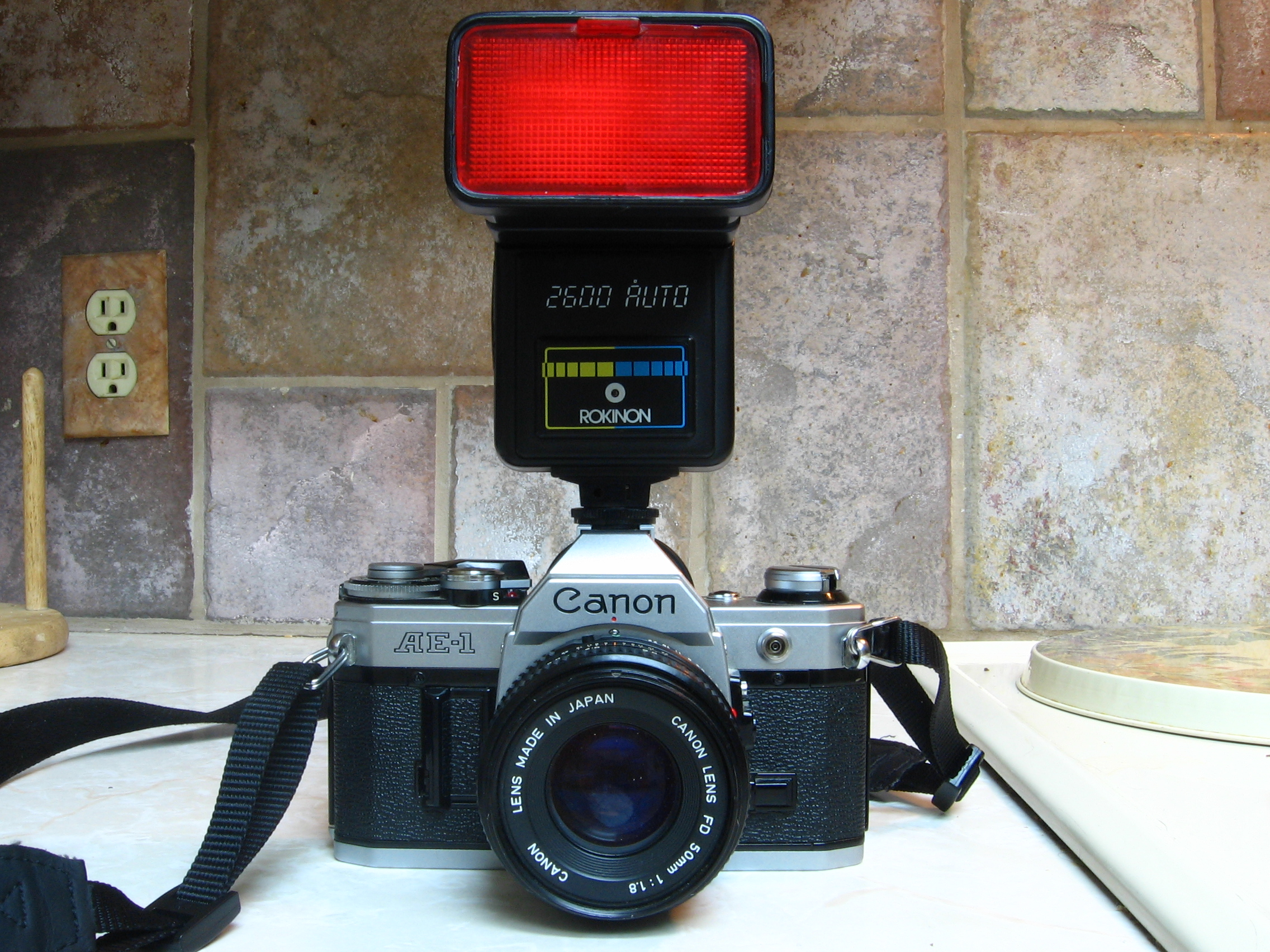
With a 3rd party flash.

=== Legacy ===
Apple sound designer Jim Reekes recorded the screen snapshot sound used on Macintosh computers and iPhones from the AE-1 he used as a high school student.

| | 1971 | 1972 | 1973 | 1974 | 1975 | 1976 | 1977 | 1978 | 1979 | 1980 | 1981 | 1982 | 1983 | 1984 | 1985 | 1986 | 1987 | 1988 | 1989 | 1990 | 1991 | 1992 | 1993 |
| Professional | | | | | | | | | | | | | | | | T90 | | | | | | | |
| Professional | | F-1 High Speed Motor Drive Camera | | | | | | | | | | | | New F-1 High Speed Motor Drive Camera | | | | | | | | | |
| Professional | F-1 | | | | | | F-1N / F-1 (Later Model) | | | | | New F-1 | | | | | | | | | | | |
| Amateur | | | | EF | | | | | A-1 | | | | | | | | | | | | | | |
| Amateur | | | | | | | | | | | | | | | T70 | | | | | | | | |
| Amateur | FTb | | | FTb-N | | | AE-1 | | | | | AE-1 Program | | | | | | | | | | | |
| Amateur | | | | | TLb | | | | | AV-1 | | | AL-1 | | | T80 | | | | | | | |
| Amateur | | | | | TX | | AT-1 | | | | | | | T50 | | | | | | | T60 | | |
