= Canon A-1 =

35mm single-lens reflex camera model

- A-1 top

Overview
- Maker: Canon Camera K. K.
- Type: 35 mm SLR
- Released: 1978
- Production: 1978-1985

Lens
- Lens mount: Canon FD

Sensor/medium
- Recording medium: 135 film

Focusing
- Focus: Manual

Exposure/metering
- Exposure metering: Center-weighted average metering

Shutter
- Frame rate: Manual lever winding, unmodified.

General
- Dimensions: 92×141×48 mm (3.6×5.6×1.9 in)
- Weight: 620 g (22 oz)

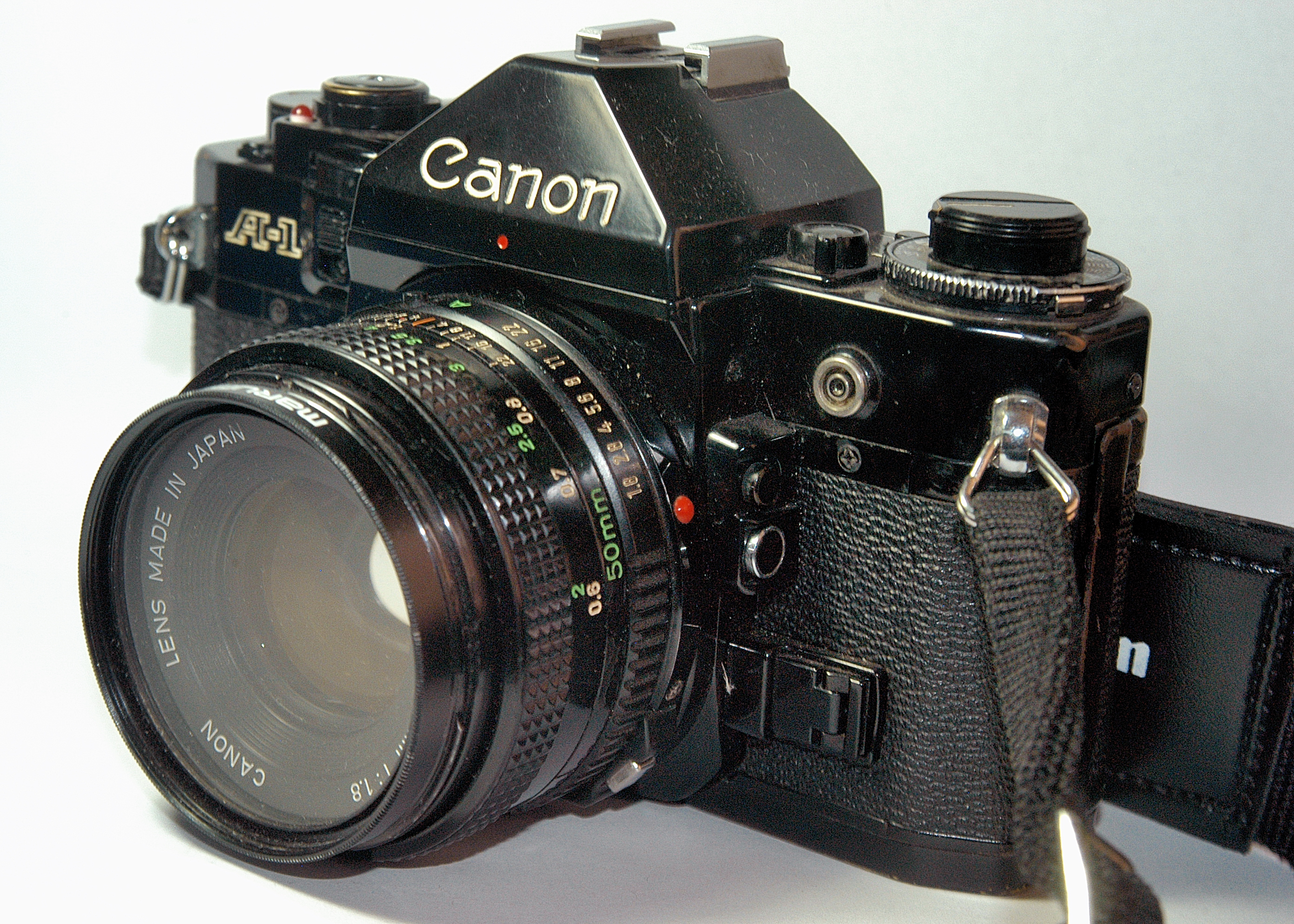
Canon A1 detail

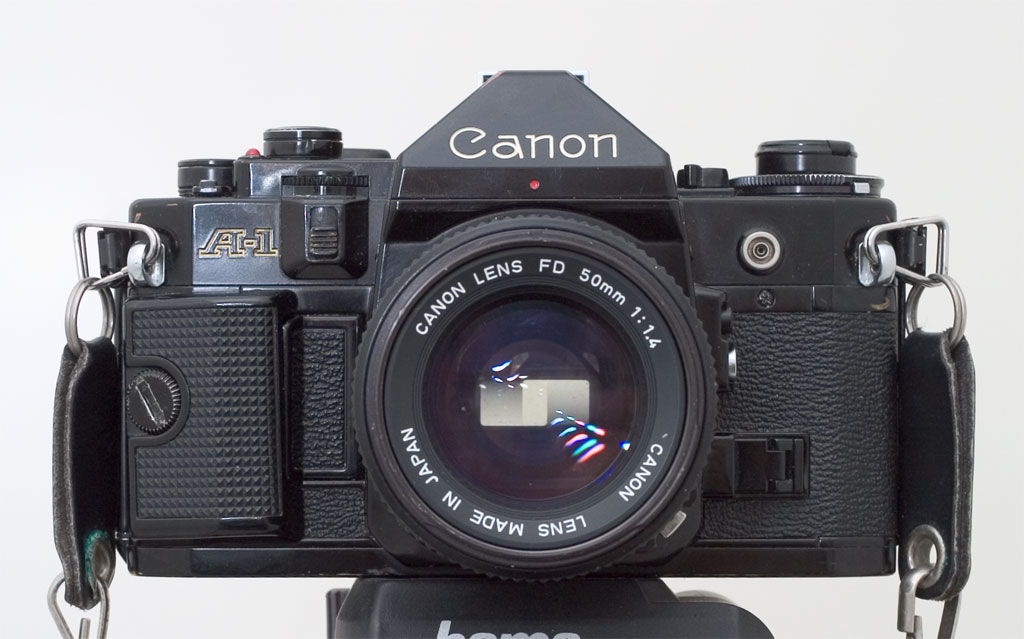
Canon A-1

The Canon A-1 is an advanced-level single-lens reflex (SLR) 35 mm film camera for use with interchangeable lenses. It was manufactured by Canon Camera K. K. (today Canon Incorporated) in Japan from March 1978 to 1985. It employs a horizontal cloth-curtain focal-plane shutter with a speed range of 30 to 1/1000 second plus bulb and flash synchronization speed of 1/60 second. It has dimensions of 92 millimetres (3.6 in) height, 141 millimetres (5.6 in) width, 48 millimetres (1.9 in) depth and 620 grams (22 oz) weight. Unlike most SLRs of the time, it was available in only one color; all black. The introductory US list price for the body plus Canon FD 50 mm f/1.4 SSC lens was $625; the camera body was generally sold with a 30–40% discount (roughly $375 to $435).

The A-1 is a historically significant camera. It was the first SLR to offer an electronically controlled programmed autoexposure mode. While the Minolta XD came out in 1977 with electronic control exposure modes, specifically Aperture Priority, Shutter Priority, Full Manual modes, as well as an "off the mode dial" full program exposure mode, the Canon A-1 offered "Program" mode. Instead of the photographer picking a shutter speed to freeze or blur motion and choosing a lens aperture f-stop to control depth of field (focus), the photographer relied on the A-1's microprocessor to automatically select a compromise exposure based on light meter input. Virtually all cameras today have at least one program mode.

== Features ==
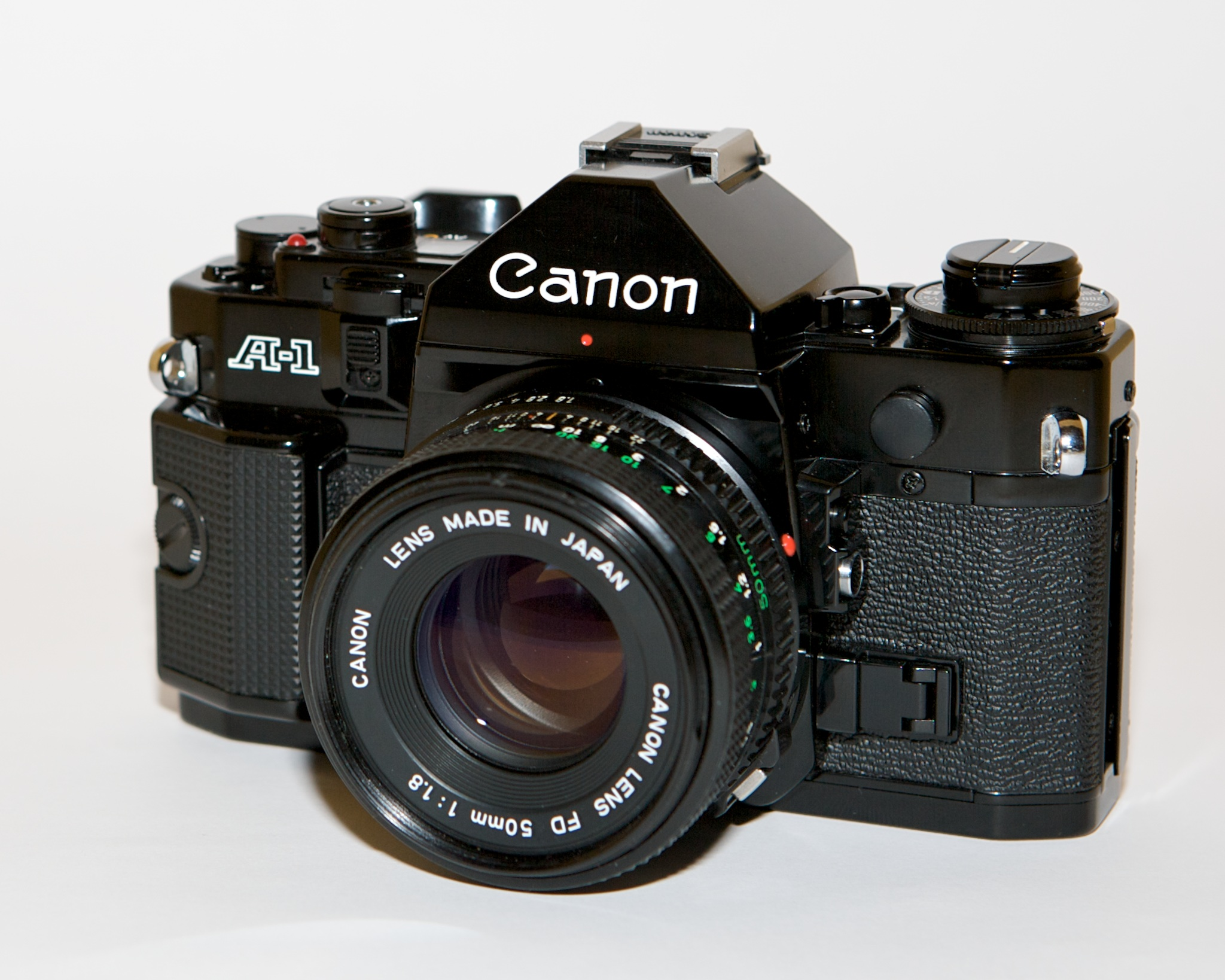
Canon A-1 with a FD 50/1.8

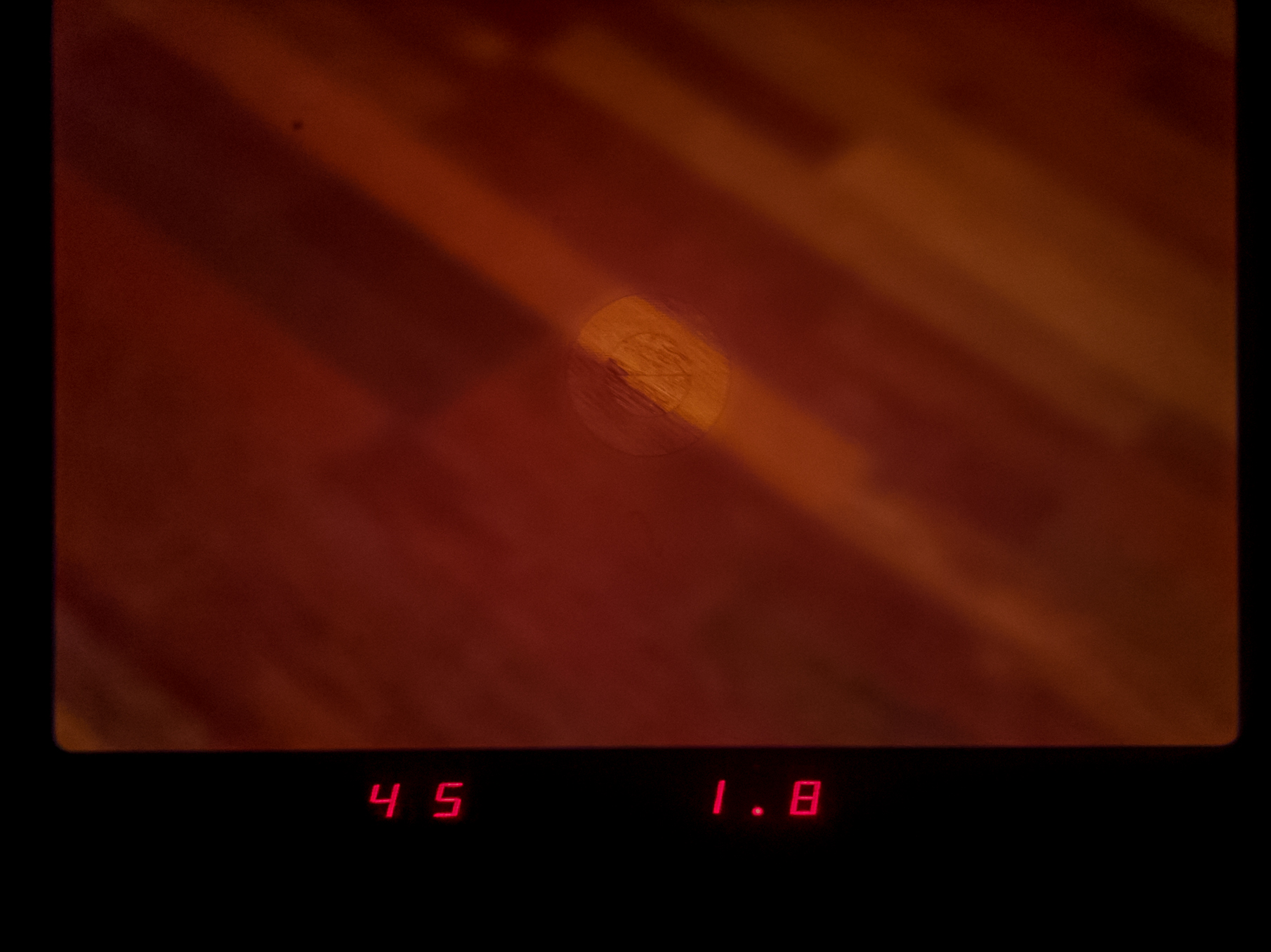
Viewfinder of a Canon A-1. The right number is the current F-number (1.8), meaning that the aperture is fairly wide open. The left number (45) indicates the approximate shutter speed of 45^{−1}s (the camera can select odd shutter speeds, but does not display them)

The A-1 accepts any lens with the Canon FD breech lock mount (introduced in 1971) or Canon New FD pseudo-bayonet mount (sometimes called the FDn mount, introduced 1979). It can also use most earlier FL lenses and some even older R (or Canomatic) series lenses, albeit with reduced functionality. This excludes all of Canon's EF bayonet mount autofocus lenses (introduced in 1987). During the late 1970s and the 1980s, there were approximately 55 Canon FD lenses available for purchase. They ranged from a 7.5mm f/5.6 fisheye to an FD 800mm f/5.6 telephoto, and included lenses with maximum apertures to f/1.2 and a line of L-series lenses of exceptional quality. Accessories for the A-1 included the Canon motor drive MA (automatic film advance up to 5 frames per second), the Canon Databack A (sequential numbering or date stamping on the film), and the Canon Speedlite 155A (guide number 56/17 (feet/meters) at ASA/ISO 100) and Canon Speedlite 199A (guide number 98/30 (feet/meters) at ASA/ISO 100) electronic flashes.

The A-1 is a battery-powered (one 4LR44 or PX-28) microprocessor-controlled manual-focus SLR with manual exposure control or shutter priority, aperture priority or programmed autoexposure. A fifth mode is "stopped down AE", in which the aperture is closed and alterable by the photographer and the camera selects the shutter speed based on the actual light reading. This differs from aperture priority in which the aperture is not closed until a photograph is taken and the shutter speed is calculated based on the light measured through the fully open aperture. Stopped down AE existed so that old FL lenses could be used with at least some kind of AE, and was also useful for photomicroscopy, manual-aperture lenses, etc. The A-1 is the first SLR to have all four of the now standard PASM exposure modes. It has a viewfinder exposure information system using a six-digit, seven-segment per digit, red alphanumeric LED display on the bottom of the viewfinder to indicate the readings of the built-in silicon photocell light meter. It supports one metering mode, center-weighted average metering. The focusing screen also has Canon's standard split image rangefinder and microprism collar focusing help.

== Design history ==
Beginning with the amateur level Canon AE-1 of 1976, there was a complete overhaul of the entire Canon SLR line. The 1970s and 1980s were an era of intense competition among the major SLR brands: Canon, Nikon, Minolta, Pentax and Olympus. Between 1975 and 1985, there was a dramatic shift away from heavy all-metal manual mechanical camera bodies to much more compact bodies with integrated circuit (IC) electronic automation. In addition, because of rapid advances in electronics, the brands continually leapfrogged each other with models having new or more automatic features, and less expensive components and assembly. The industry was trying to expand out from the saturated high-end professional market and appeal to the large mass of low-end amateur photographers keen to move up from compact automatic leaf shutter rangefinder cameras to the more "glamorous" SLR but were intimidated by the need to learn all the details of operating a traditional SLR.

The A-1 is the high technology standard bearer of the landmark Canon amateur level A-series SLRs. The other members of the A-series are the Canon AE-1 (released 1976), AT-1 (1977), AV-1 (1979), AE-1 Program (1981) and AL-1 (1982). They all use the same compact aluminum alloy chassis, but with differing feature levels and outer cosmetic acrylonitrile-butadiene-styrene (ABS) plastic panels. By sharing most major components, and an inexpensive horizontal cloth-curtain shutter, costs could be spread out over a larger production volumes. The A-1 represented Canon's bid to defeat Nikon through more features and cheaper pricing.

The A-1 attracted much press attention when it was released in early 1978, though not all comments were positive. Some professional photographers worried about the long term reliability of its consumer-level mechanical and electronic components under heavy daily use, the relatively slow flash sync and top shutter speeds. Traditionalist photographers complained about an "excess" of automation ruining the art of photography, a criticism that was leveled at all of the newly automated cameras released in the 1980s. However, the automated features appealed to many new amateur photographers on a budget, and the camera saw strong sales.

Later, as competitors brought out their own programmed SLRs, the A-1 began to show its age. This is especially true for its horizontal cloth-curtain shutter, viewfinder information display and autoflash control. The A-1 was due for replacement when the Canon T90 came out in 1985. Canon's abandonment of the FD lens mount for the EOS design also had a significant effect on demand for the A-1 on the used market.

== Notes ==
	1971	1972	1973	1974	1975	1976	1977	1978	1979	1980	1981	1982	1983	1984	1985	1986	1987	1988	1989	1990	1991	1992	1993
Professional																T90							
Professional		F-1 High Speed Motor Drive Camera												New F-1 High Speed Motor Drive Camera									
Professional	F-1						F-1N / F-1 (Later Model)					New F-1											
Amateur				EF					A-1														
Amateur															T70								
Amateur	FTb			FTb-N			AE-1					AE-1 Program											
Amateur					TLb					AV-1			AL-1			T80							
Amateur					TX		AT-1							T50							T60		
