= Canonet =

Series of rangefinder cameras

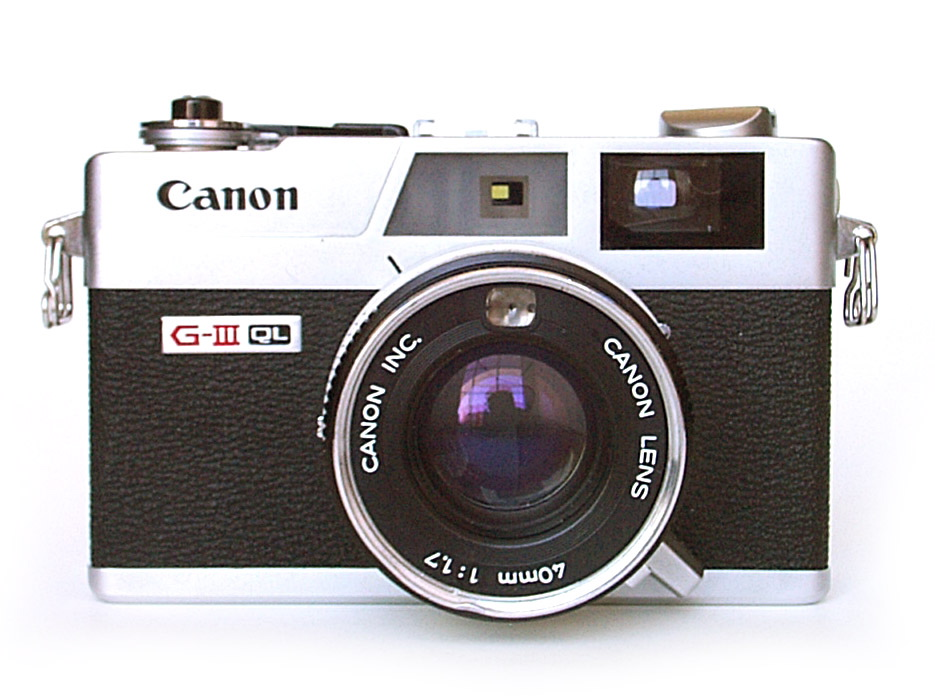
A Canonet GIII QL-17 from the early 1970s

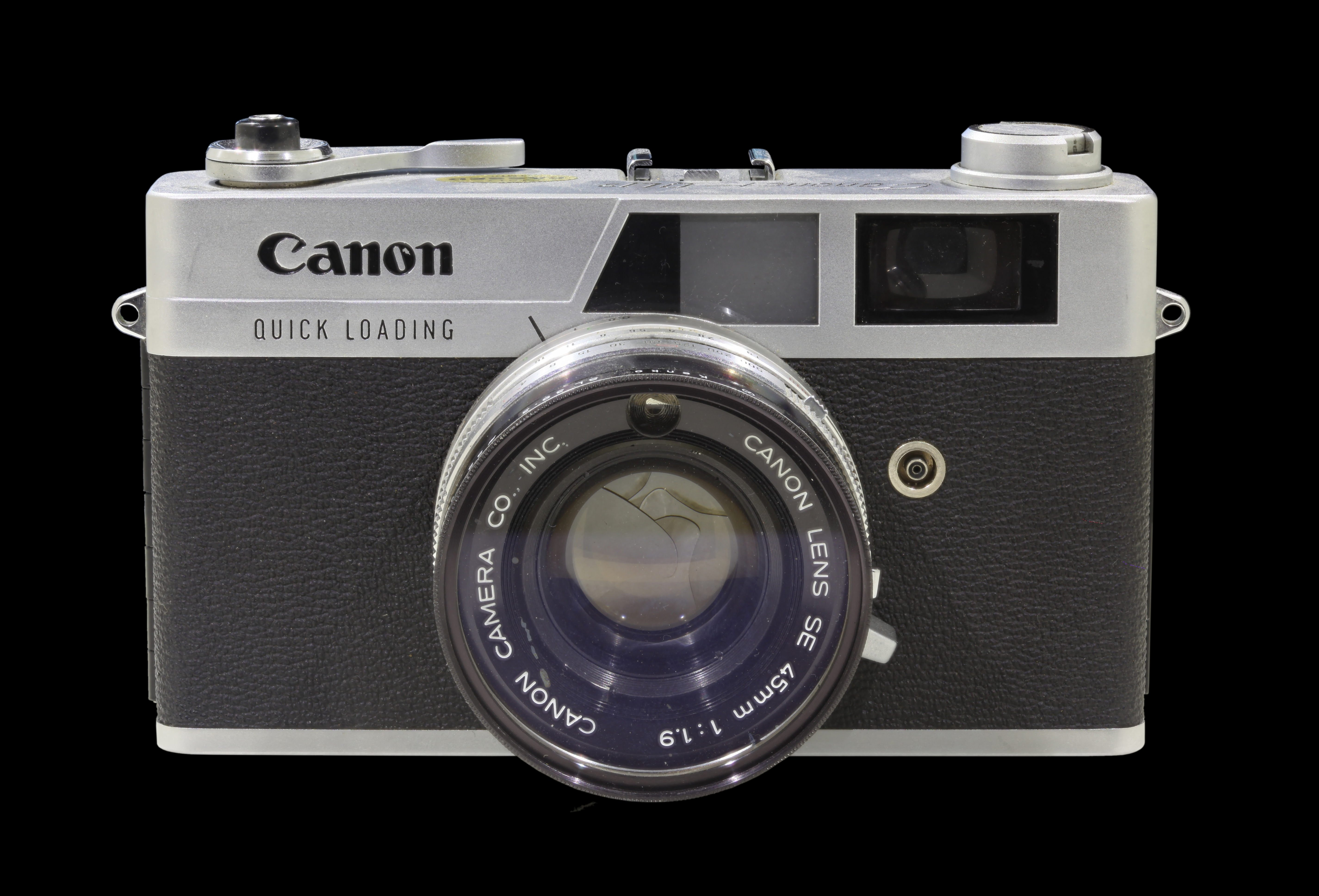
Canonet GIII QL-19

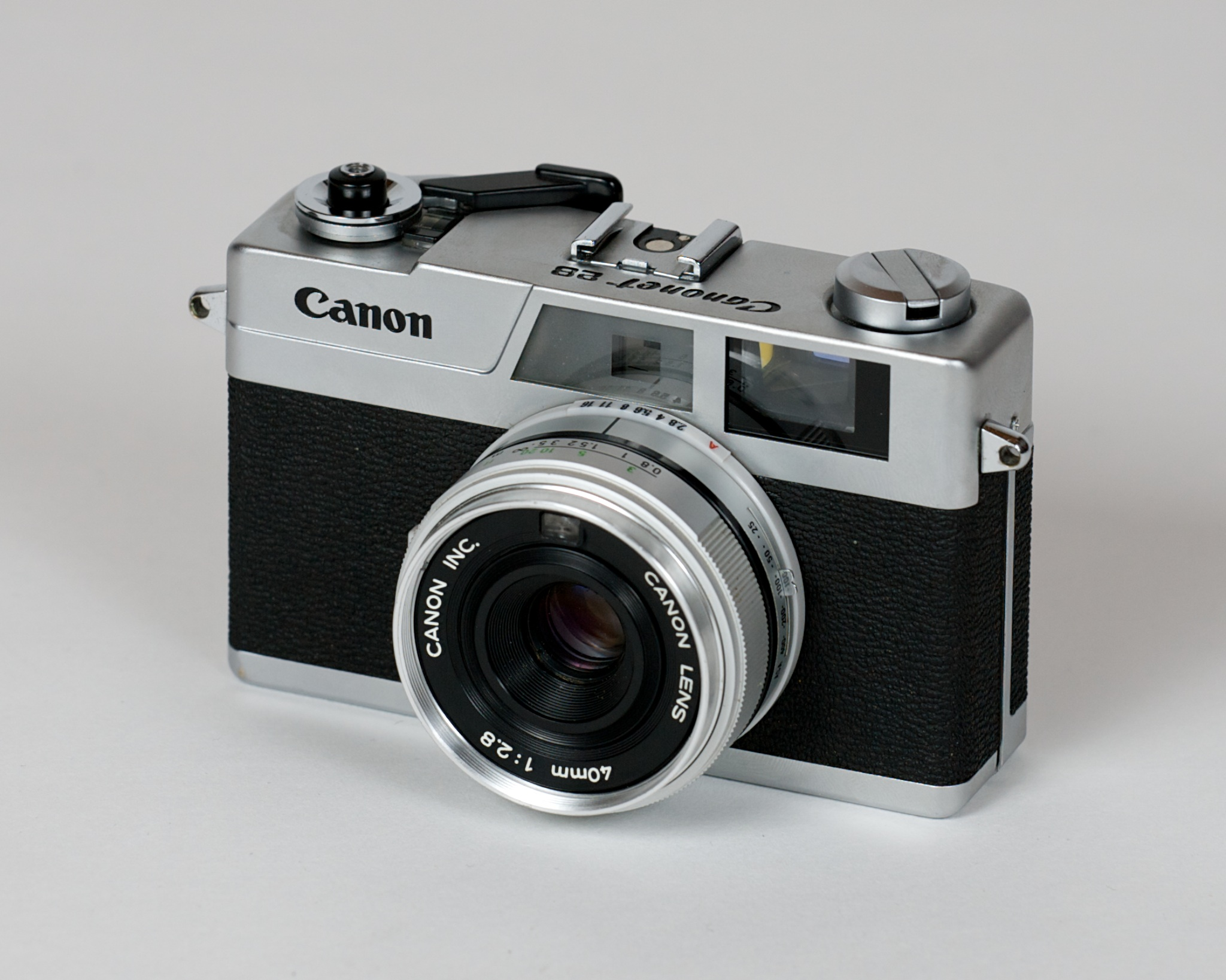
New Canonet 28 from 1971

The Canonets were a series of rangefinder cameras made by Canon from the early 1960s to the early 1980s. They were aimed at enthusiasts on a budget and more discerning point-and-shoot photographers. The cameras are considered to have made Canon famous worldwide.

== Models ==
The models included:

- Canon Canonet
- Canon Canonet S
- Canon Canonet Junior
- Canon Canonet QL 17
- Canon Canonet QL 17 New
- Canon Canonet QL 17-L New
- Canon Canonet QL 17 GIII
- Canon Canonet QL 19
- Canon Canonet QL 19E
- Canon Canonet QL 19 New
- Canon Canonet QL 19 GIII
- Canon Canonet QL 25
- Canon Canonet 28
- Canon Canonet 28 New
- Canon Canodate E
- Canon Canodate E-N
- Canon Datematic

== See also ==
- Point-and-shoot camera
