= Canon AE-1 Program =

35 mm single-lens reflex camera

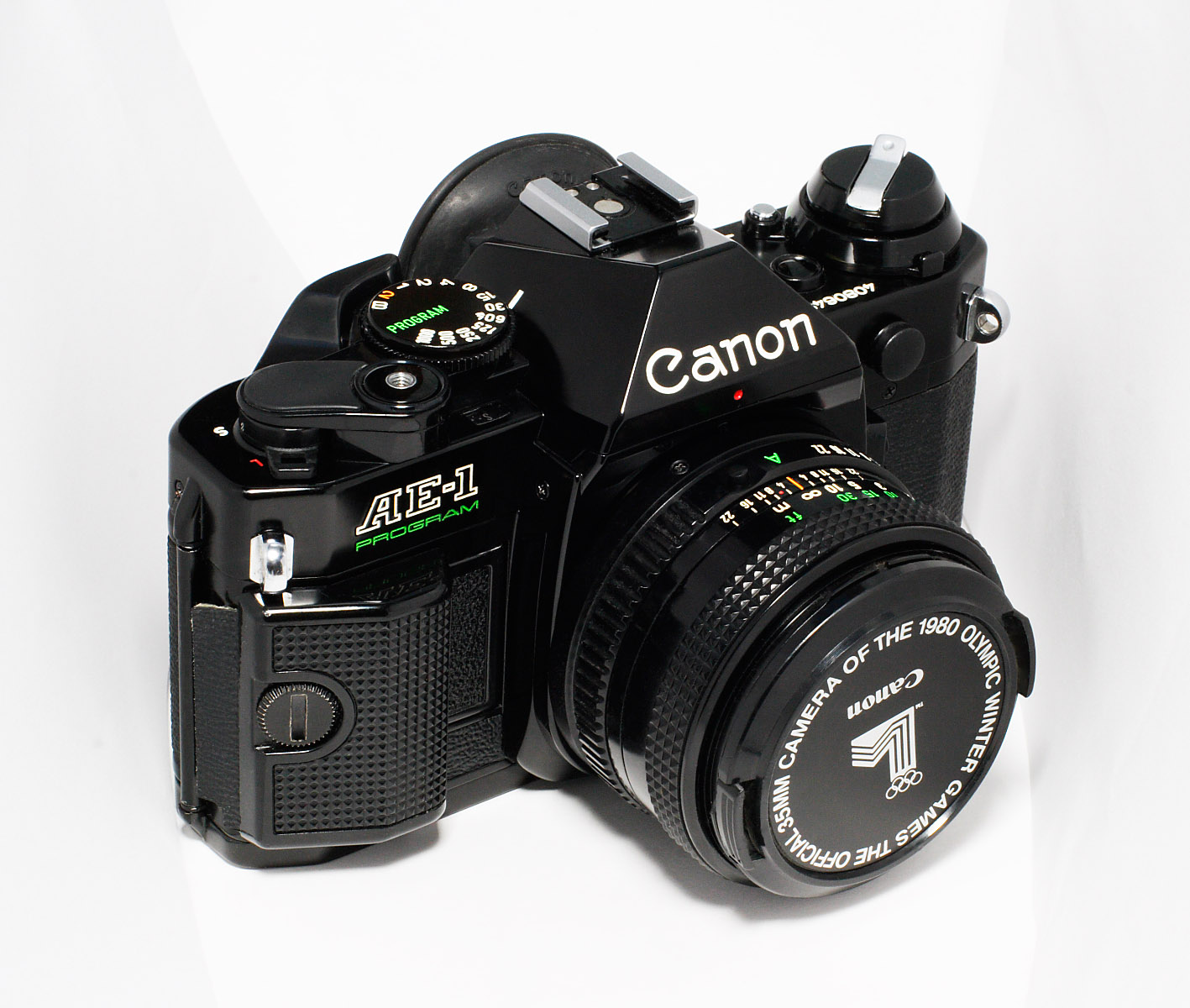
- Canon AE-1 Program with all-black finish

Overview
- Maker: Canon Camera K. K.
- Type: 35 mm SLR
- Released: 1981
- Production: 1981-1989
- Intro price: ¥60,000 (equivalent to ¥84,741 in 2024), body only; ¥92,000 (equivalent to ¥129,936 in 2024), w/New FD 50mm f/1.4SSC; ¥86,500 (equivalent to ¥122,168 in 2024), w/New FD 50mm f/1.8SSC

Lens
- Lens mount: Canon FD

Sensor/medium
- Film speed: ISO 12 to 3200 [manual]
- Recording medium: 135 film

Focusing
- Focus: Manual

Exposure/metering
- Exposure: Program, shutter priority, manual
- Exposure metering: EV1 to EV18 @ ASA 100

Flash
- Flash: Hot shoe
- Flash synchronization: 1/60 s

Shutter
- Shutter speed range: 2 s to 1/1000 s

General
- Battery: 4LR44 6V battery or 4 LR44 1.5 volt batteries
- Dimensions: 87×141×47.5 mm (3.43×5.55×1.87 in)
- Weight: 575 g (20 oz)
- Made in: Japan

Chronology
- Predecessor: Canon AE-1

The Canon AE-1 Program is a 35 mm single-lens reflex camera that uses the Canon FD lens mount manufactured by Canon Camera K. K. (today Canon Incorporated) in Japan and introduced in April 1981 as the successor to the Canon AE-1, five years after that camera's introduction. The major difference was the addition of the Program AE mode first seen in the A-1. This mode sets both the shutter speed and aperture automatically—albeit with a slight bias towards the shutter speed setting. The user focuses the camera and then presses the shutter button. For those desiring more control, the AE-1's shutter priority auto-exposure and full manual modes are still available.

== Features ==
Like the A-1, the AE-1 Program has a right-hand "action grip" on the front of the camera. It also supports the A-1's Motor Drive MA; this requires another electrical contact on the base plate. The AE-1's Power Winder A, and a new, faster Power Winder A2, are also supported. The viewfinder uses LEDs to show information to the user.

Also like the A-1, the AE-1 Program supports interchangeable focusing screens. Unlike the A-1, though, which specifies that screens should only be changed by the factory or by experienced service technicians, those on the AE-1 Program can be changed by the user. The camera came standard with the new split/microprism screen, but seven others were available. The focusing screen on the AE-1 Program is brighter than any previous focusing screen on any Canon manual focus camera, allowing the user to focus with greater ease with "slow" lenses (up to f/5.6). It is the same focusing screen design that is used in the newest model of the top-of-the-line Canon F-1 (known as the New F-1).

The AE-1 Program retains the older A-series type electromagnet-controlled cloth-curtain shutter that limits top shutter speed to 1/1000 of a second, together with a rather slow flash sync speed of 1/60 second. In the years since the AE-1 Program was introduced, this shutter design has also proven to be more maintenance-intensive than modern vertical-travel metal blade designs. The camera's electronics and electromagnets are powered by one 4SR44, PX28A, A544, K28A, V34PX, 4LR44, or L544 alkaline battery.

The additional electronics used for the program features of the AE-1P have resulted in more electronic gremlins over the years, and the model is considered by some more difficult to repair than earlier and simpler A-series cameras. In its day, however, the AE-1 Program's automated features and simple controls helped introduce many new consumers to the SLR camera.

== Gallery ==
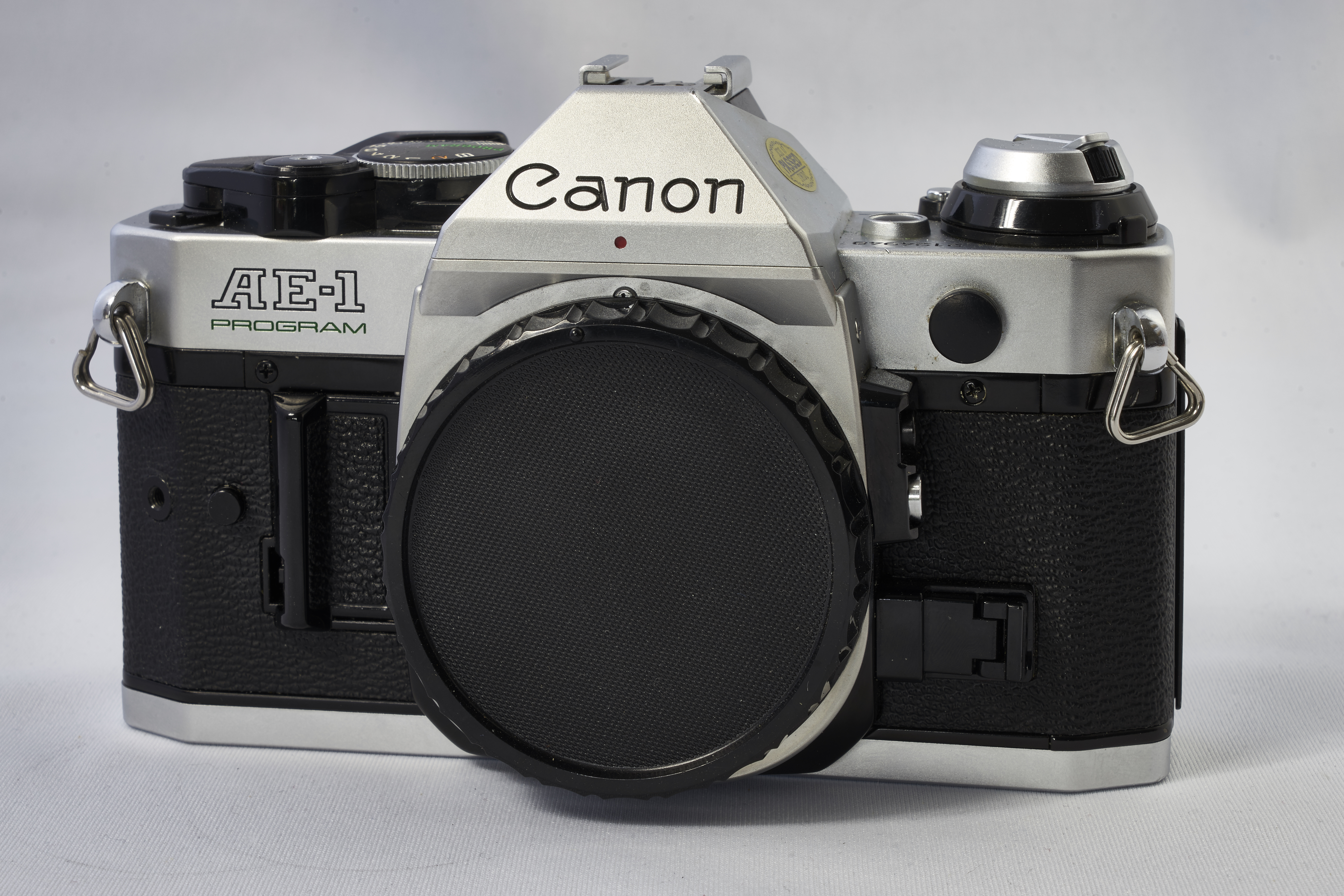
Canon AE-1 Program body with silver finish

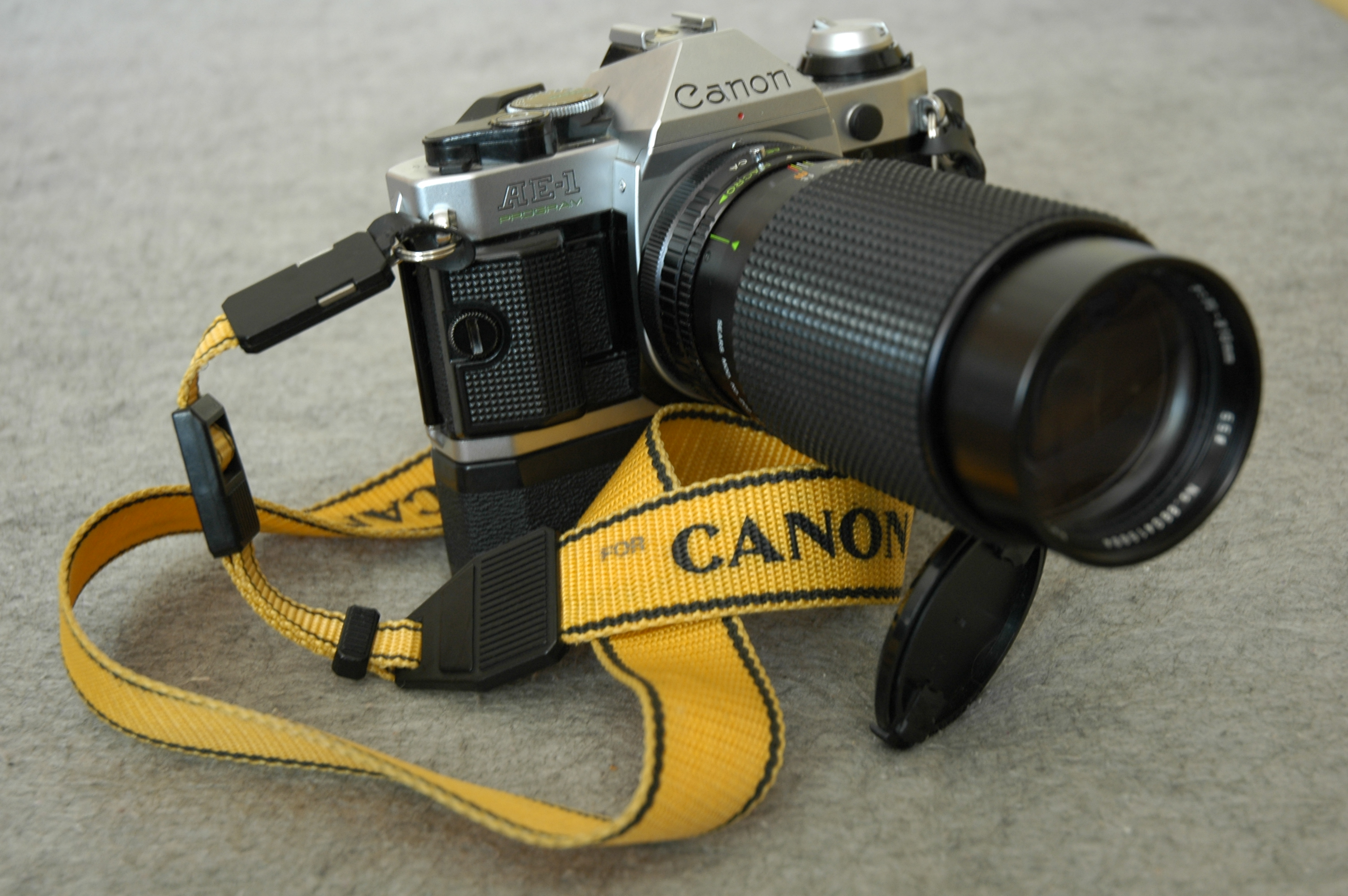
Canon AE-1 Program with telephoto lens and power winder

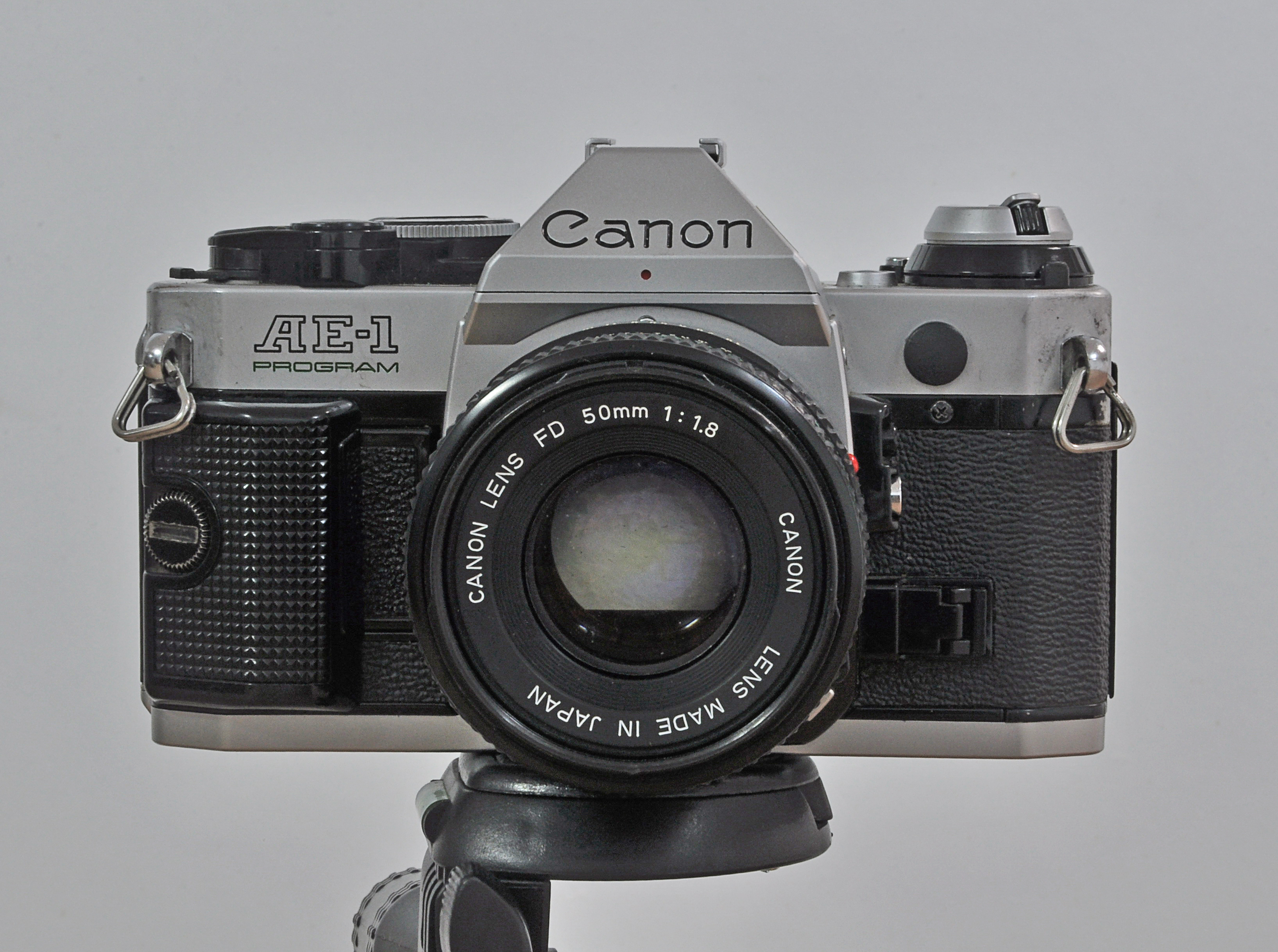
AE-1 Program with Canon 50mm 1:1.8

== See also ==
- List of Canon cameras

	1971	1972	1973	1974	1975	1976	1977	1978	1979	1980	1981	1982	1983	1984	1985	1986	1987	1988	1989	1990	1991	1992	1993
Professional																T90							
Professional		F-1 High Speed Motor Drive Camera												New F-1 High Speed Motor Drive Camera									
Professional	F-1						F-1N / F-1 (Later Model)					New F-1											
Amateur				EF					A-1														
Amateur															T70								
Amateur	FTb			FTb-N			AE-1					AE-1 Program											
Amateur					TLb					AV-1			AL-1			T80							
Amateur					TX		AT-1							T50							T60		
