= Canonet G-III QL17 =

35mm rangefinder camera

Canon Canonet G-III QL17
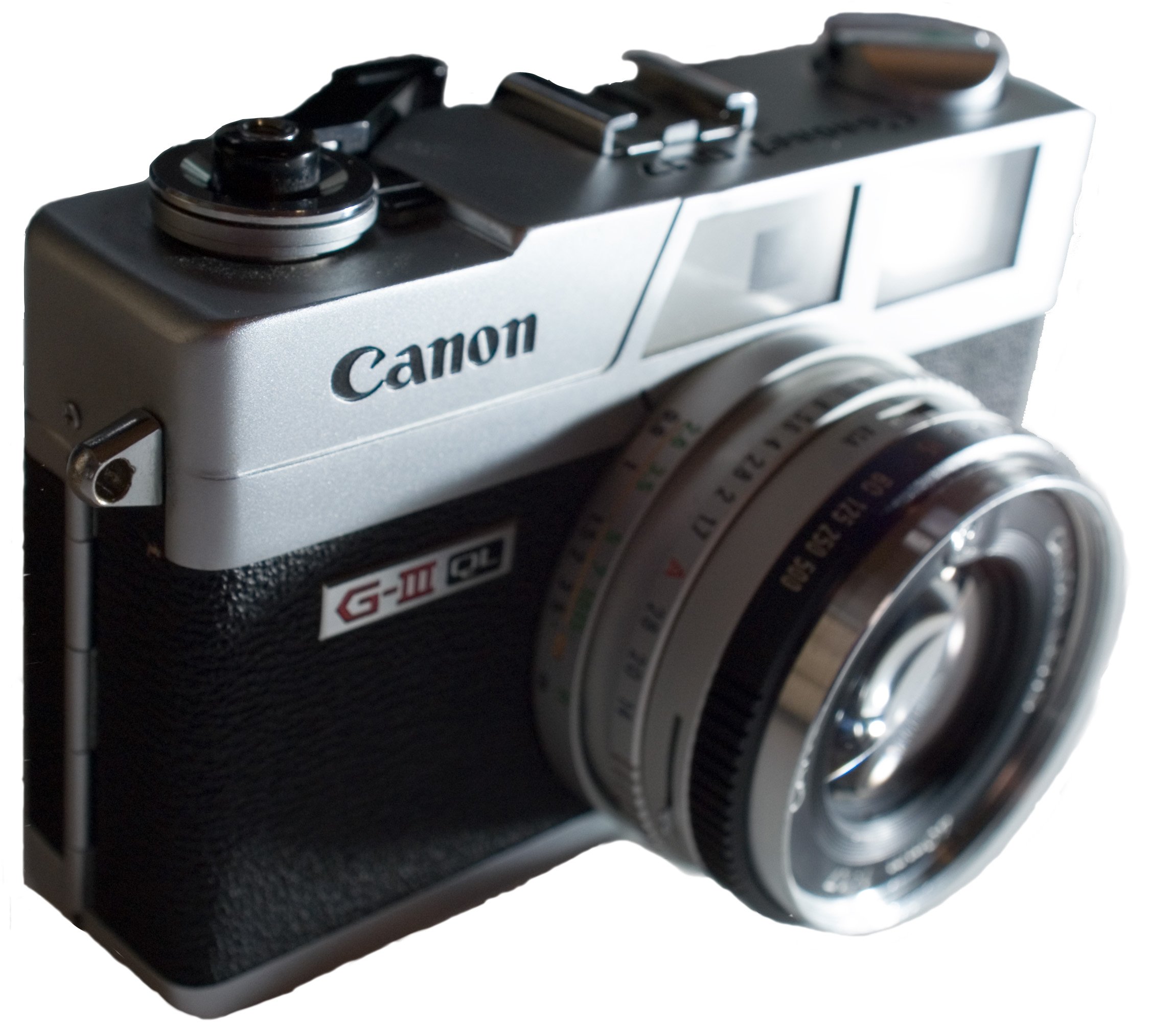

Overview
- Type: 35 mm rangefinder camera

Lens
- Lens mount: integrated

Focusing
- Focus: Coupled rangefinder with parallax compensation, 0.6× magnification

Exposure/metering
- Exposure: shutter priority autoexposure

Flash
- Flash: External hot shoe, PC connector

General
- Dimensions: 120 × 75 × 60 mm, 620 g

The Canon Canonet G-III QL17 is a coupled-rangefinder, leaf-shuttered, fixed-focal-length 35 mm camera first manufactured by Canon between 1972 and 1982. It features fully shutter-priority automatic exposure and fully manual shooting modes.

The Canonet G-III is the third generation of Canonet, following the original Canonet and the New Canonet.

The G-III features a 40 mm f/1.7 with six elements in four groups. The integrated lightmeter provides shutter priority and manual modes. The sensor is located on the forward part of the lens, which allows use of filters without manual compensation of exposure. The Canonet can use standard flashes, or the Canolite D which was custom-designed for the Canonet.

== Exposure meter ==
The exposure meter uses a PX625 mercury battery, which is now discontinued. The alkaline equivalent can be used, but the different voltage, different discharge curve, and absence of voltage regulation circuit cause incorrect metering that results in between 1.5-f-stop underexposure at the beginning of the life of the alkaline battery and 1.5-f-stop overexposure at the end.

Furthermore, the mercury battery has a life span of several years, compared to a few months for the alkaline battery. This degree of incorrect exposure is tolerable with negative colour or black-and-white films, but is more noticeable with slide films.

Many users will use a 1.4-volt hearing aid battery or adapters with Schottky diodes that allow use of SR-44 battery with better results. A zinc-air replacement battery can also be used. This battery has the same voltage as the PX625 mercury battery, and therefore is seen as a viable replacement by many.

The G-III camera made checking the battery easier by the addition of the battery check button on the side of the viewfinder eyepiece. A lamp on the camera would light when the battery was still good.
