= Canon AT-1 =

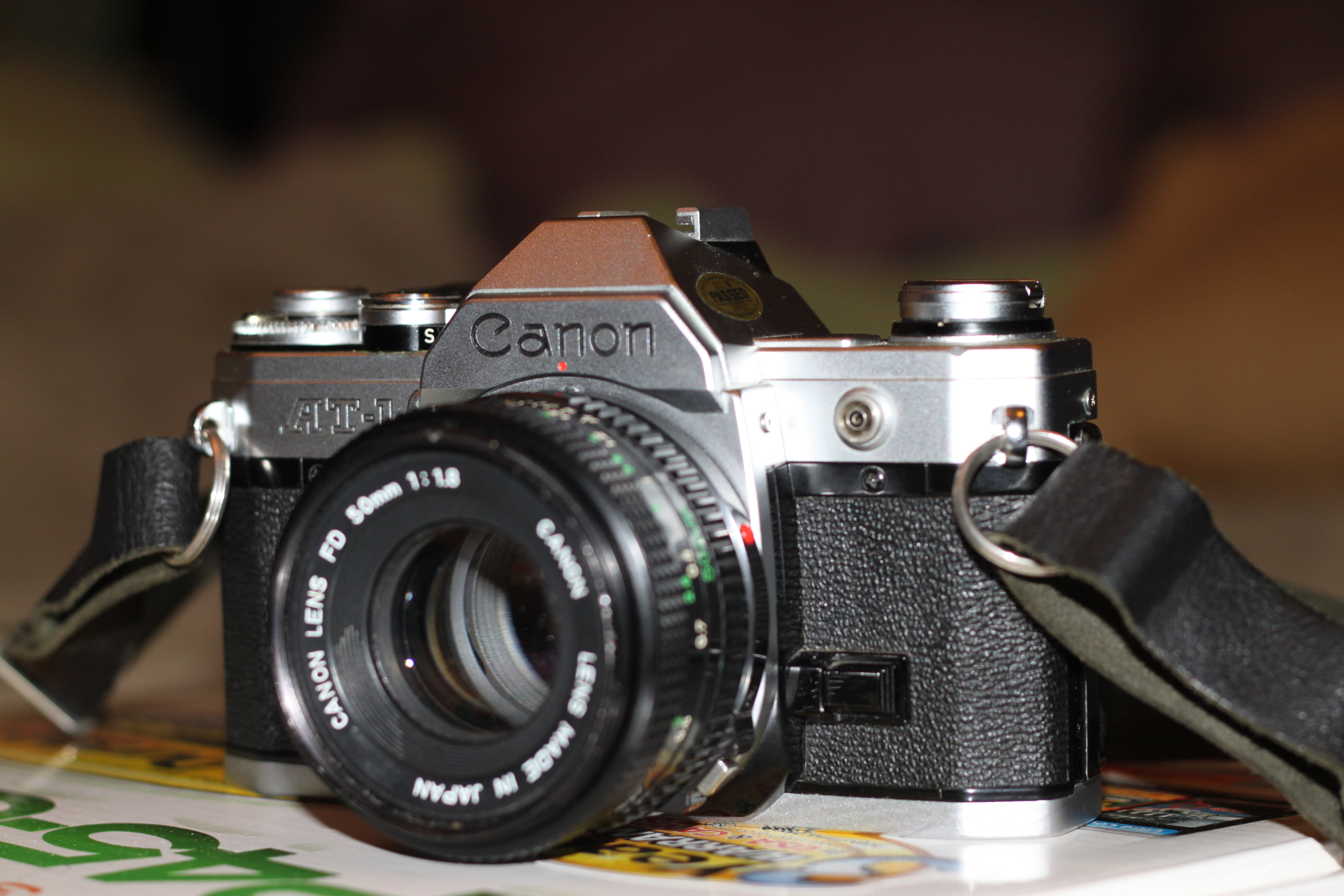

Overview
- Maker: Canon Camera K. K.
- Type: 35 mm SLR

Lens
- Lens mount: Canon FD

Sensor/medium
- Film speed: ISO 25 to 3200

Focusing
- Focus: Manual

Exposure/metering
- Exposure: Manual

Flash
- Flash synchronization: 1/60 s

Shutter
- Shutter speed range: 2 s to 1/1000 s

General
- Battery: 4SR44 6V battery
- Made in: Japan

The Canon AT-1 is a 35mm FD-mount single-lens reflex camera manufactured by Canon of Japan from December 1976. It was produced purely for export and was never sold in the home Japanese market. It is a version of the popular AE-1 but without the shutter-speed priority auto-exposure mode of that camera. The AT-1 features manual exposure only. This made the camera cheaper.

A light meter is included, featuring TTL center-weighted average metering with a CdS photocell, and a match needle in the viewfinder.

The accessories produced for the AE-1 also work with the AT-1, including motor drives.

Similar to the AE-1 and AE-1 program camera, it has a built-in light meter. The aperture settings are in the lens.

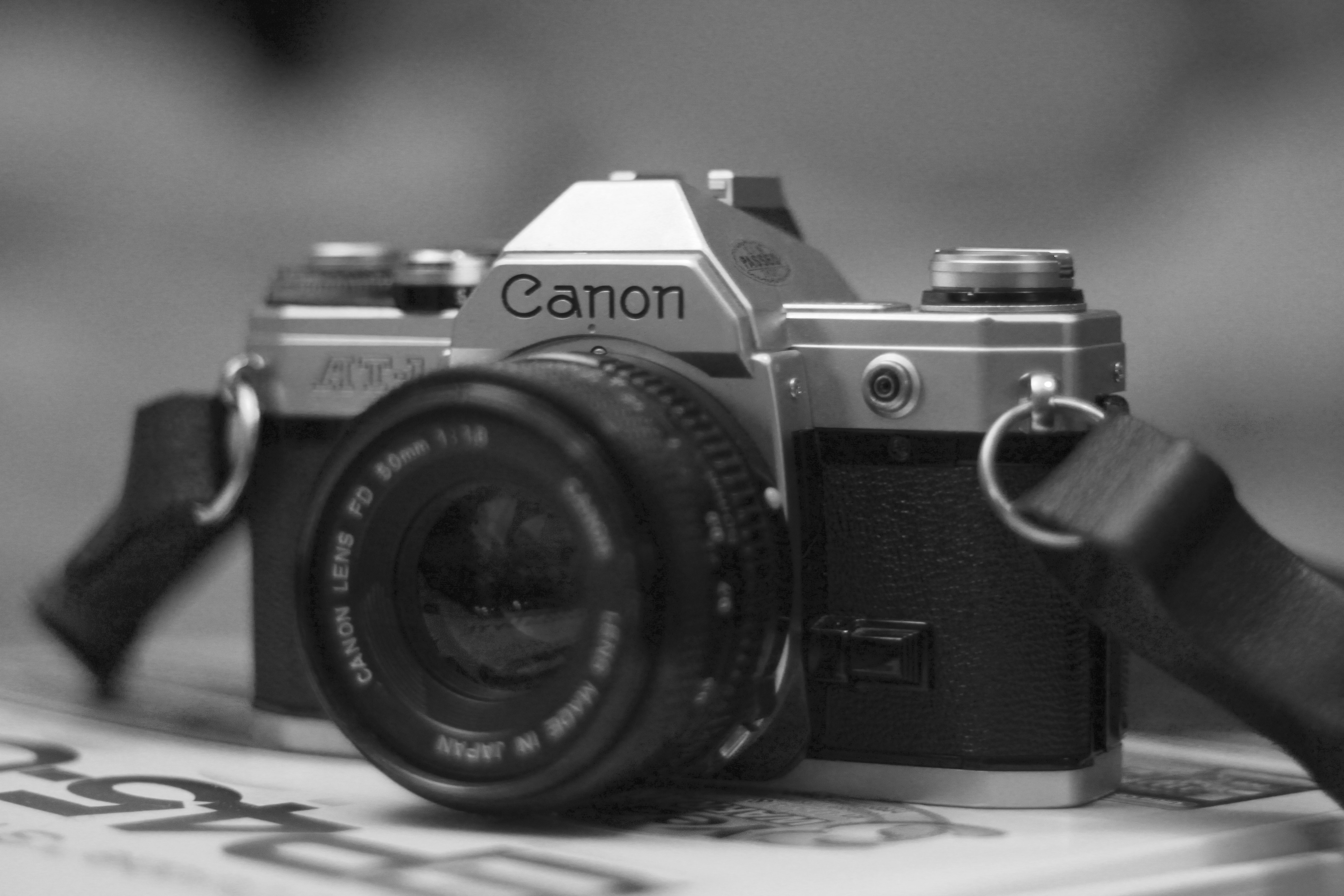
Canon AT-1 with 50mm f/1.8 Lens

	1971	1972	1973	1974	1975	1976	1977	1978	1979	1980	1981	1982	1983	1984	1985	1986	1987	1988	1989	1990	1991	1992	1993
Professional																T90							
Professional		F-1 High Speed Motor Drive Camera												New F-1 High Speed Motor Drive Camera									
Professional	F-1						F-1N / F-1 (Later Model)					New F-1											
Amateur				EF					A-1														
Amateur															T70								
Amateur	FTb			FTb-N			AE-1					AE-1 Program											
Amateur					TLb					AV-1			AL-1			T80							
Amateur					TX		AT-1							T50							T60		
