= Canon AV-1 =

35 mm SLR camera

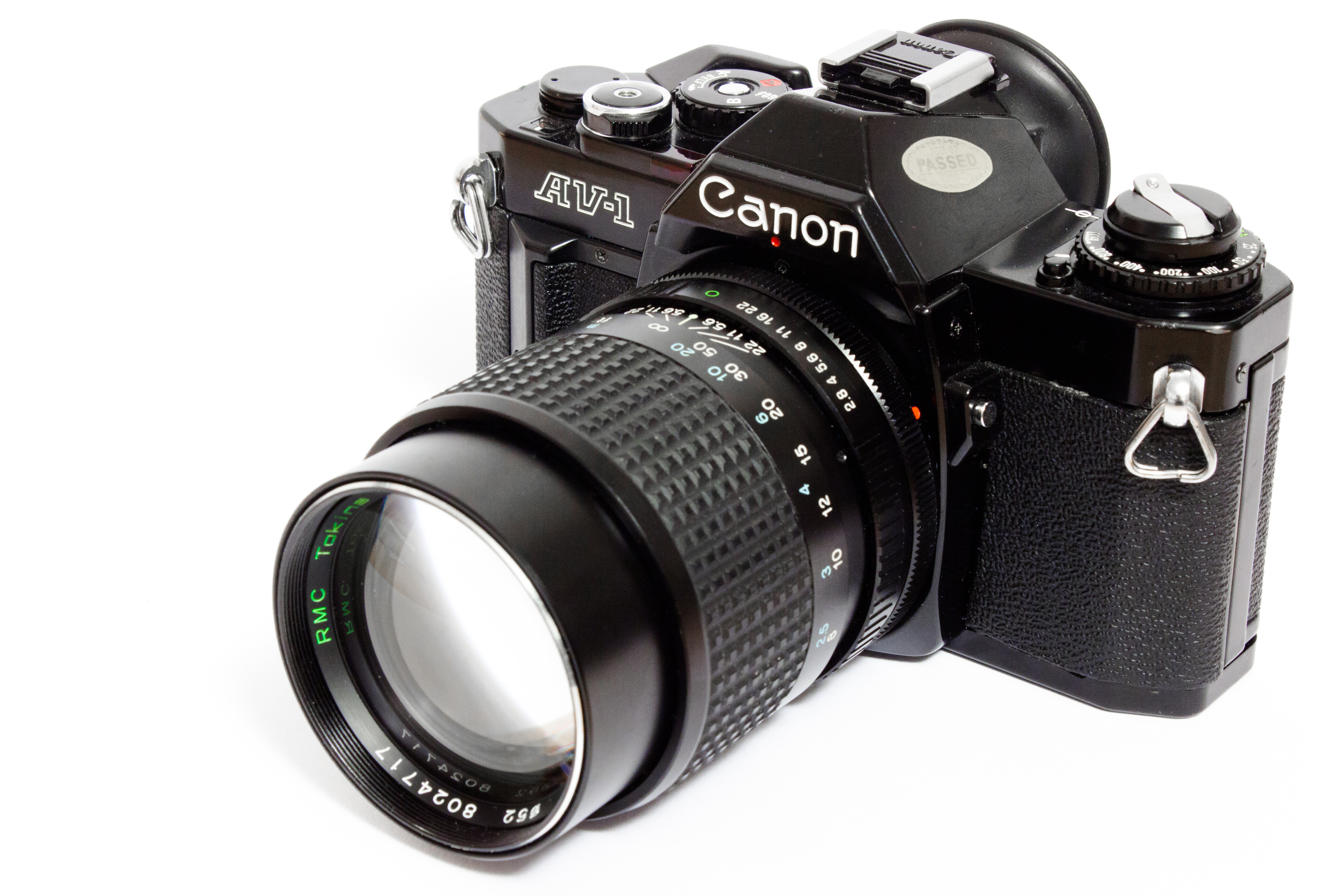

Overview
- Maker: Canon Inc.
- Type: 35 mm SLR camera

Lens
- Lens mount: Canon FD

Focusing
- Focus: manual

Exposure/metering
- Exposure: Aperture priority

Flash
- Flash: Hot shoe

Shutter
- Frame rate: Manual lever winding, unmodified.

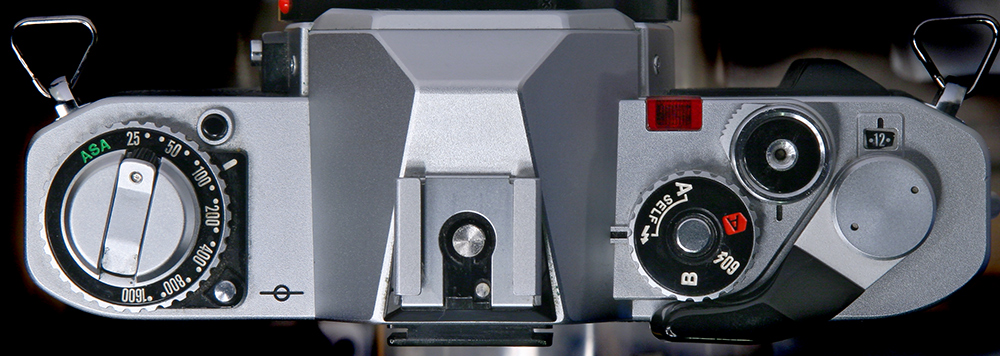
Top view of controls.

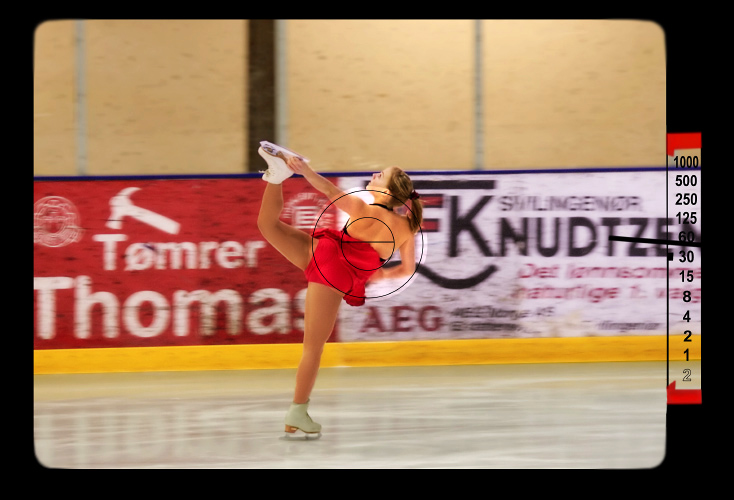
Illustration of the image in finder of AV-1

The Canon AV-1 is a 35 mm single-lens reflex camera with an FD lens mount, introduced by Canon Inc. in 1979.

The AV-1 is very similar to the 1976 AE-1 but provides aperture priority autoexposure rather than the AE-1's shutter speed priority AE. The camera is not capable of fully manual exposure. Canon's international distributors, particularly in the United States, had clamored for such a camera because competing brands offered mostly aperture-priority cameras and some preferred it. The AV in the name referred to the type of autoexposure; Av (Aperture Value) is a common abbreviation for aperture priority.

When this camera appeared, a new range of FD lenses was introduced, with instant mounting/unmounting of the lens. This is called the New FD mount and does away with the older type of mounting ring which was fitted on to the rear of the lens and was awkward to use and needed two hands, to a newer, easier system whereby the user lined up the red dot on the lens, with the red dot on the camera and simply turned the whole lens clockwise until it clicked into place.

All the other AE-1 accessories fit the AV-1.

	1971	1972	1973	1974	1975	1976	1977	1978	1979	1980	1981	1982	1983	1984	1985	1986	1987	1988	1989	1990	1991	1992	1993
Professional																T90							
Professional		F-1 High Speed Motor Drive Camera												New F-1 High Speed Motor Drive Camera									
Professional	F-1						F-1N / F-1 (Later Model)					New F-1											
Amateur				EF					A-1														
Amateur															T70								
Amateur	FTb			FTb-N			AE-1					AE-1 Program											
Amateur					TLb					AV-1			AL-1			T80							
Amateur					TX		AT-1							T50							T60		
