= Canon AL-1 =

35 mm film single-lens reflex camera

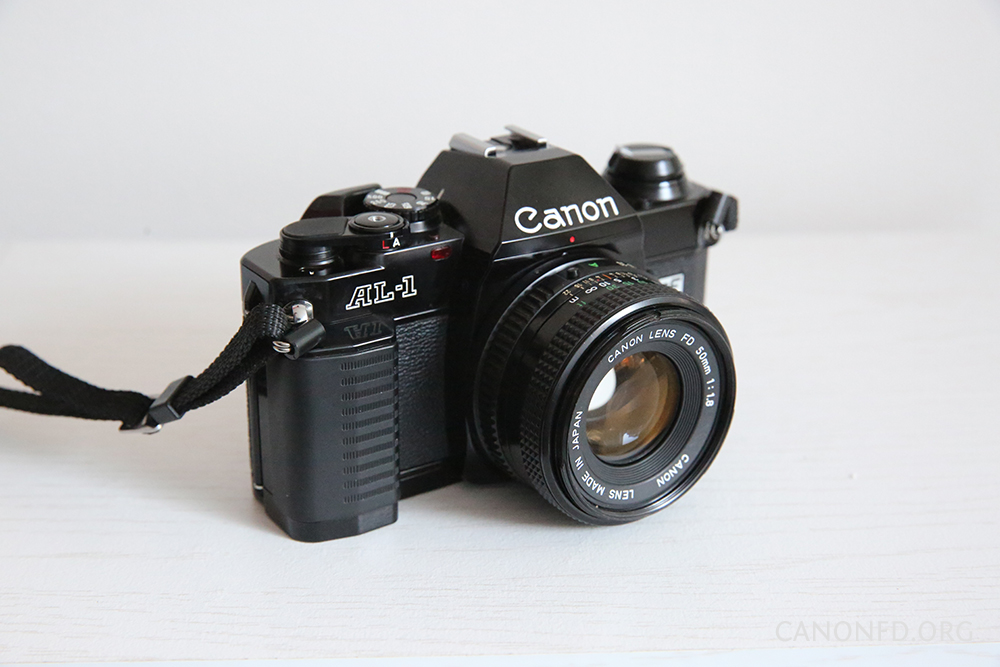

Overview
- Maker: Canon Camera K. K.
- Type: 35 mm SLR

Lens
- Lens mount: Canon FD

Sensor/medium
- Film speed: ISO 25 to 1600

Focusing
- Focus: Manual

Exposure/metering
- Exposure metering: EV3.5 to EV18

Flash
- Flash: Hot shoe
- Flash synchronization: 1/60 s

Shutter
- Frame rate: Manual lever winding, unmodified.
- Shutter speed range: 2 s to 1/1000 s

General
- Dimensions: 86.5×142.1×47.6 mm (3.41×5.59×1.87 in)
- Weight: 490 g (17 oz)
- Made in: Japan

The Canon AL-1 was an FD mount, 35mm single-lens reflex camera introduced in March 1982. Its main feature was the "Quick Focus" focus-assist system that was aimed at those who had trouble focusing through the viewfinder—either novices, or those with poor eyesight—and was intended to head off competition from the first full-autofocus cameras from other manufacturers, such as the Pentax ME F.

== Features ==
As a lower-end camera, the AL-1 did not offer a long list of features. Instead, Canon focused on providing core functionality and lowering price. The AL-1 provides focus-confirmation, aperture-priority autoexposure (controlled by a through-the-lens silicon photocell), manual shutter speeds from 1/15 to 1/1000 of a second, and a 10-second self-timer. It also added a larger grip, and the convenience of using of AAA cells for power. However the battery door is one of its weakness as most of the cameras that are found today on the market have a battery door that is broken or has been replaced. Its body was constructed from a special polycarbonate that was then painted to imitate metal. An ISO hotshoe, A-series power winder connections, and cable-release socket provide an acceptable level of compatibility with accessories. It was also the last Canon SLR to use the Canon logo, which resembles the Japanese romaji font used on Canon cameras since the 1960s on a pentaprism.

The camera uses Canon's breech-lock FD mount, and so users could choose from the wide variety of Canon FD lenses, as well as those from third parties. Users could also utilise Canon R and FL lenses, but with some limitations.

In 1987, Canon abandoned the FD mount in favour of the EF mount along with the EOS camera system, which uses the same concept as the T80 but with a new and incompatible mount designed around an all-electronic interface.

== Autofocus ==
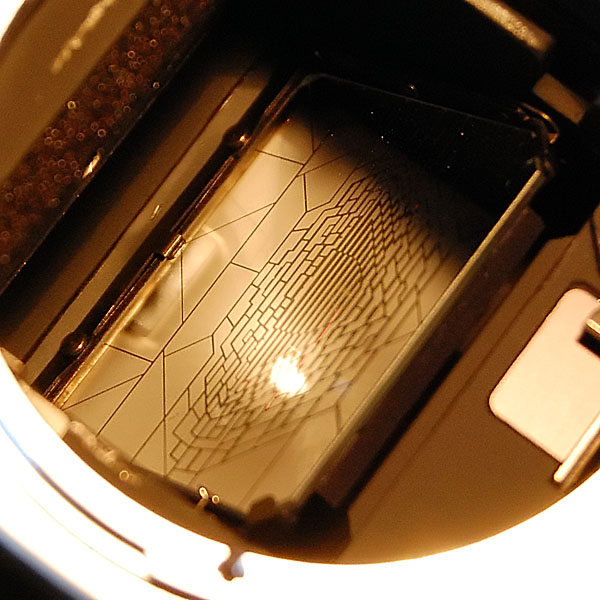
The mirror of a Canon AL-1, showing the etched gaps in the mirror coating that allow light to reach the phase-detection system.

The AL-1 marked Canon's first public foray into autofocus technology. While far from a true autofocus system, the camera acted a test for Canon engineers to evaluate phase detection for SLR cameras. The QF focus-assist system uses traditional phase detection linear CCD arrays in the base of the camera. Light is diverted to these sensors through a partially silvered mirror. When the light of the subject is in phase, the image is in focus. Below the viewfinder image, two red arrows indicate which direction to turn the focusing ring to achieve focus. Optimum focus is indicated by a green light (circle) between the two arrows.

Due to the camera's lack of features, it was never overly popular and so it would be 1985 before Canon expanded on the concept, even though its competitors raced ahead. In 1983 Nikon introduced the F3AF, a special version of their pro-series F3, which used a special viewfinder with a built-in autofocus system connecting electronically to a motor in the lens. In 1985 Minolta introduced the Maxxum 7000 (Dynax 7000 in Europe and Asia), the world's first body-integrated autofocus SLR. Canon reacted to this with the T80, which integrated the focus system into the body and, as with the F3AF, connected electronically with a motor in the lens.

	1971	1972	1973	1974	1975	1976	1977	1978	1979	1980	1981	1982	1983	1984	1985	1986	1987	1988	1989	1990	1991	1992	1993
Professional																T90							
Professional		F-1 High Speed Motor Drive Camera												New F-1 High Speed Motor Drive Camera									
Professional	F-1						F-1N / F-1 (Later Model)					New F-1											
Amateur				EF					A-1														
Amateur															T70								
Amateur	FTb			FTb-N			AE-1					AE-1 Program											
Amateur					TLb					AV-1			AL-1			T80							
Amateur					TX		AT-1							T50							T60		
