= Trigger =

Trigger may refer to:

== Arts, entertainment and media ==
=== Fictional entities ===
- Trigger (Only Fools and Horses), in the TV sitcom
- Trigger Argee, in science fiction short stories by James H. Schmitz
- Devil Trigger, a transformation ability of Dante in Devil May Cry
- Trigger, a horse in "Ernie (The Fastest Milkman in the West)"
- Trigger, the protagonist and player character of Ace Combat 7: Skies Unknown
- Trigger, the version of Popeye in the 1933 film The Story of Temple Drake
- Trigger, a playable character in Zenless Zone Zero

=== Film and television ===
- Trigger (2010 film), a Canadian comedy-drama
- Trigger (2022 film), an Indian Tamil-language action thriller
- Trigger (Russian TV series), a medical drama series since 2020
- Trigger (South Korean TV series), a 2025 action series
- Triggers: Weapons That Changed the World, a 2011–2013 American TV series
- "Trigger" (Supergirl), a 2017 TV episode

=== Literature ===
- The Trigger, a 1999 novel by Arthur C. Clarke and Michael P. Kube-McDowell
- Triggers (novel), by Robert J. Sawyer, 2012
- The Trigger: The Lie That Changed the World – Who Really Did It and Why, a 2019 book by David Icke

=== Music ===
==== Albums and EPs ====
- Trigger (EP), by In Flames, 2003
- Trigger (album), by Porno Graffitti, 2010
- Trigger, a 2025 album by Amane Kanata
- Trigger, a 2019 album by GreatGuys
- Trigger, a 2017 album by Jacob Quistgaard
- Trigger, a 1988 album by Soulside
- Trigger, a 2012 album by The Law

==== Songs ====
- "Trigger" (song), by Major Lazer and Khalid, 2019
- "Trigger", a song by Anne-Marie from the 2018 album Speak Your Mind
- "Trigger", a song by Converge from the 2017 The Dusk in Us
- "Trigger", a song by In Flames from the 2002 album Reroute to Remain
- "Trigger", a song by Itzy from the 2025 album Collector
- "Triggers", a song by Royal Blood from the 2023 album Back to the Water Below
- "Trigger", a 2013 song by Marcel Woods and W&W
- "Trigger", a 2019 song by CarryMinati and Wily Frenzy

==== Other uses in music ====
- Trigger (drums), a transducer that allows a drum to control an electronic device
- Trigger (guitar), the Martin N-20 guitar played by Willie Nelson
- Trigger, part of a trombone
- The Trigger (band), a Serbian hard rock/heavy metal band

== People ==
- Trigger Alpert (1916–2013), American jazz bassist
- Bruce Trigger (1937–2006), Canadian archaeologist
- Damon Trigger (born 1972), cricketer for England
- Hannah Trigger (born 1987), Australian snowboarder
- Ian Trigger (1938–2010), British actor

== Science and technology ==
- Trigger (firearms), a mechanism that actuates the firing of firearms
- Trigger (particle physics), in a particle detector
- Database trigger, procedural code in a database
- Trigger strategy, a class of strategies in game theory
- Image trigger, in a digital camera
- Trigger, an event that creates a landslide
- Trigger, part of a gamepad

== Other uses ==
- Trigger (horse), owned by cowboy star Roy Rogers
- Trigger, a term for symmetrical voice
- Trauma trigger, an event causing traumatic memories or feelings to resurface
- Stimulus (psychology), a broader concept occasionally colloquially referred to as a "trigger"
- Studio Trigger, a Japanese animation studio
- USS Trigger, the name of several ships

== See also ==
- Triggered (disambiguation)
- Trigger pad, a device used in electronic percussion
- Trigger Warning (disambiguation)
- Environmental factor
- Flip-flop (electronics)
- Schmitt trigger, in electronics
- Spawning trigger, causing fish to breed
- Detonator, in explosives
- Pyrotechnic initiator, in explosives
