= Trigger Warning =

A trigger warning is a content warning that a work contains material that may be distressing.

Trigger Warning may also refer to:

- Trigger Warning (book), a 2015 collection of short fiction and verse by Neil Gaiman
- Trigger Warning (film), a 2024 American action thriller
- Trigger Warning with Killer Mike, a 2019 American documentary series
- Trigger Warning (EP), by Knife Party, 2015

== See also ==
- Trigger (disambiguation)
- Triggered (disambiguation)
