= Bulb (photography) =

Shutter technique on cameras

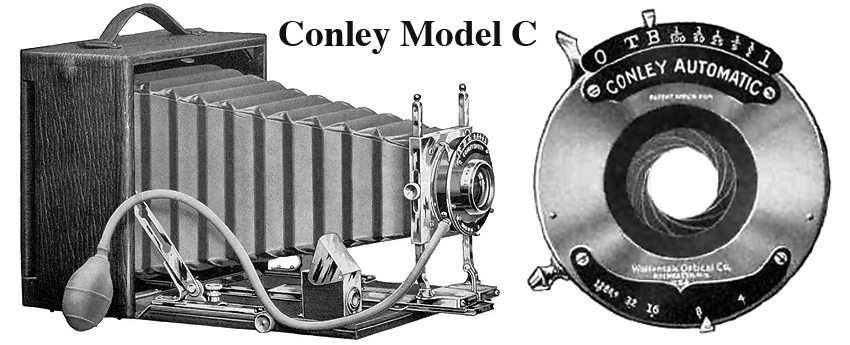
Bulb is named for the bulb on detachable rubber pneumatic shutter releases that came with early cameras. With shutters set to "B", the pneumatic release kept the shutter open for as long as the photographer squeezed the bulb—a "Bulb" exposure.

The Bulb setting (abbreviated B) on camera shutters is a momentary-action mode that holds shutters open for as long as the photographer depresses the shutter-release button. The Bulb setting is distinct from shutter's Time (T) setting, which is an alternate-action mode where the shutter opens when the shutter-release button is pressed and released once, and closes when the button is actuated again.

== History ==
Decades before the first flashbulbs, some box cameras and many view cameras and folding cameras came with a detachable pneumatic shutter release with a rubber bulb on the end; "Bulb" refers to the rubber shutter release bulb. Though mechanically timed exposures could also be triggered by squeezing the shutter release bulb, "Bulb" exposures then had the same momentary action as camera shutters have today, as per this description from Sears Roebuck's 1909 Cameras [&] Photographic Supplies:

With the indicator set to B, the shutter opens when the bulb is pressed and remains open as long as the pressure is maintained (“bulb” exposure), a very convenient means of making time exposures of only a few seconds’ duration.

Around 1894 in Germany, the momentary-action setting on camera shutters made by C. A. Steinheil & Söhne in Munich were denoted with "B" but the literature referred to it as Beliebig (meaning beliebige Zeit, English: "Any time").

The Eastman Kodak Company sold entry-level consumer cameras that did not have the option of a pneumatic shutter release. Though Kodak retained the convention of using "B" on shutters to denote the setting that provides momentary actuation, they referred to it as "Brief Time" in brochures for cameras like their Folding Autographic Brownies, as well as in instruction manuals for products like their 1 & 1A Pocket "Kodaks" Juniors. "Brief time" was also used in reference works like Newnes Photographers' Pocket Reference Book (1955).

== Use ==
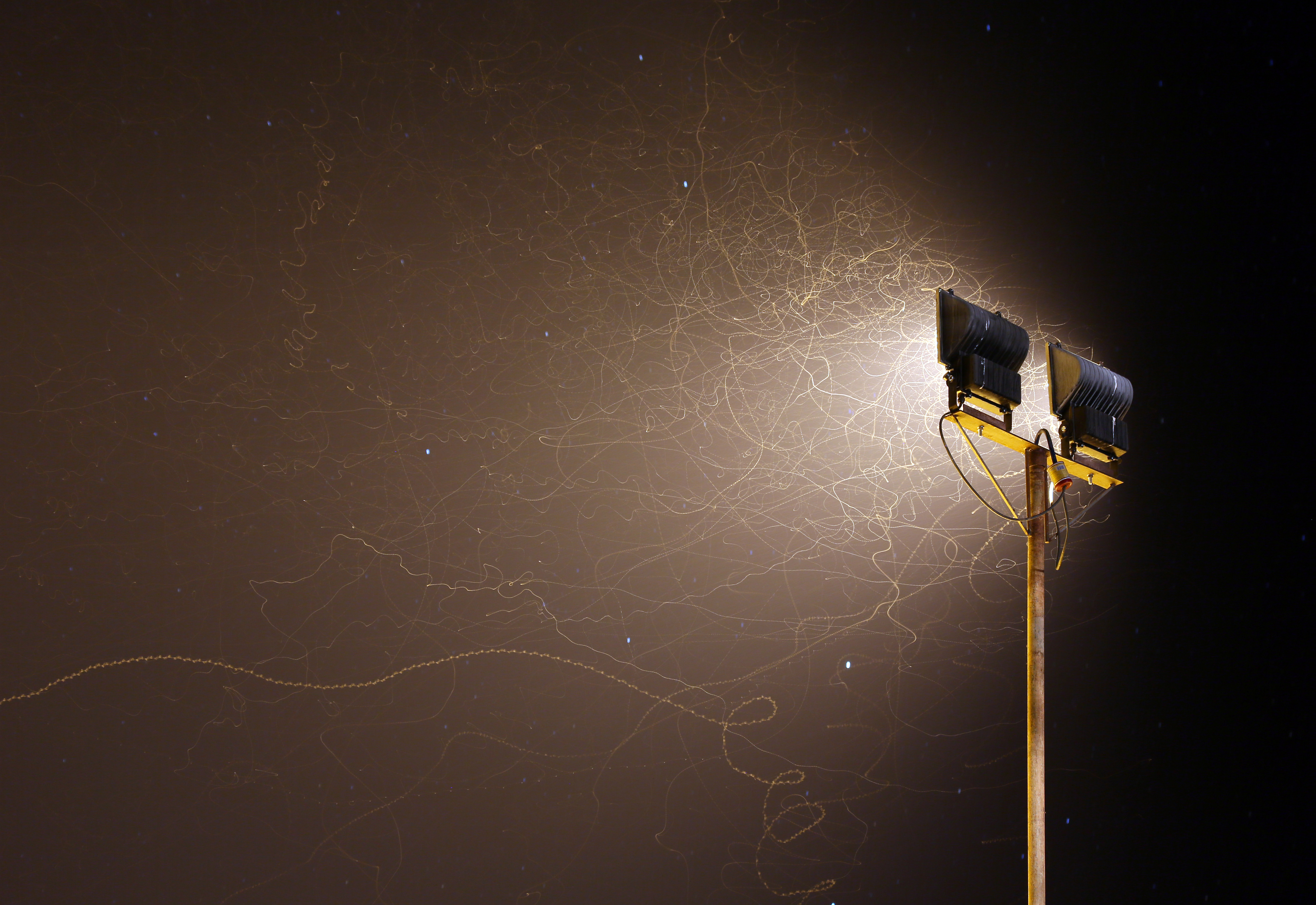
This 30-second exposure shows the flight trails of several insects around a floodlight at night.

The bulb setting is used on some cameras, including some point-and-shoot cameras, to obtain shutter speeds slower than the minimum offered by the camera otherwise.

Because of the risk of camera movement, the camera is most often mounted on a tripod for the duration of the exposure. While it is generally possible to use the shutter release button on the camera itself, a cable release or electronic remote is often used to further eliminate the risk of shaking the camera during long exposures. The cable releases generally include a locking feature to eliminate the need to keep the button or plunger depressed during extremely long exposures.

The bulb setting is useful for the following types of photographic subjects:

- fireworks at night
- the night sky and celestial objects (see astrophotography)
- lightning
- streets at night (creating streaks from moving cars)
- light painting

== On modern cameras ==
On some modern cameras, bulb is a mode available as an option on the LCD menu only, if possible at all. On others, including many Digital SLR cameras, bulb is typically available from the manual exposure mode and—rarely—also from shutter priority mode.

When set to bulb, generally on the "M" or manual setting of the camera, the shutter will stay open as long as the shutter release button (or shutter release cable or remote) remains depressed.

Some mid-level or bridge cameras such as the Olympus SP-560UZ have a 'limited' bulb setting, allowing time exposures up to 8 minutes and at an ISO setting of 200 ISO and lower.

In 2012, Olympus introduced a new form of bulb mode with their "Live Bulb" (without toggle) and "Live Time" (with toggle) settings in their Olympus OM-D E-M5 digital camera, where the viewfinder and display gets updated during the exposure in order to allow the photographer to inspect the exposure while it "develops". The display refresh rate for this mode can be configured between 0.5 s and 60 s.

Some specialized cameras use other image triggers.

== Gallery ==
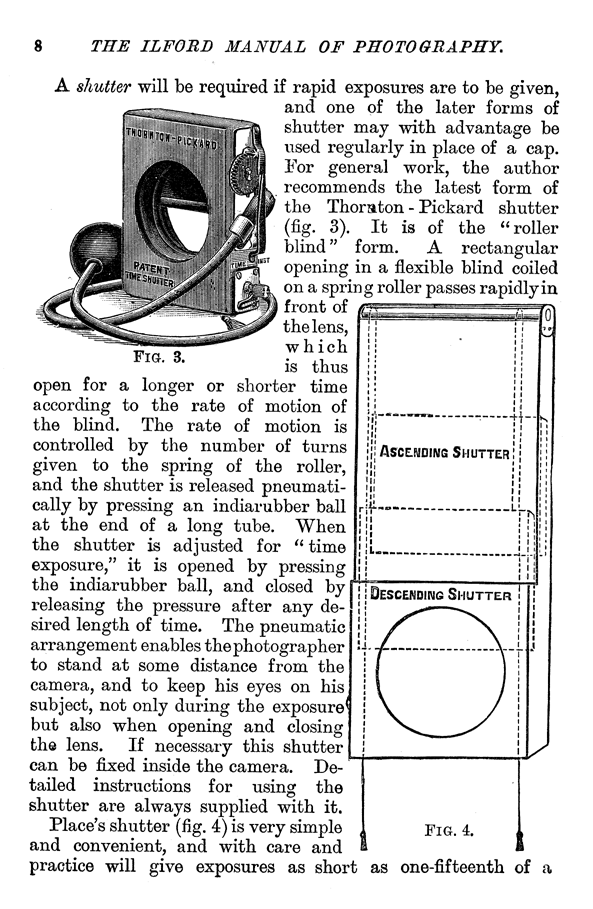
Circa 1894 page showing a camera with an "indiarubber ball" and a "time exposure" mode that works like what came to be called "bulb". Suggests that the "bulb" terminology had not yet been introduced.

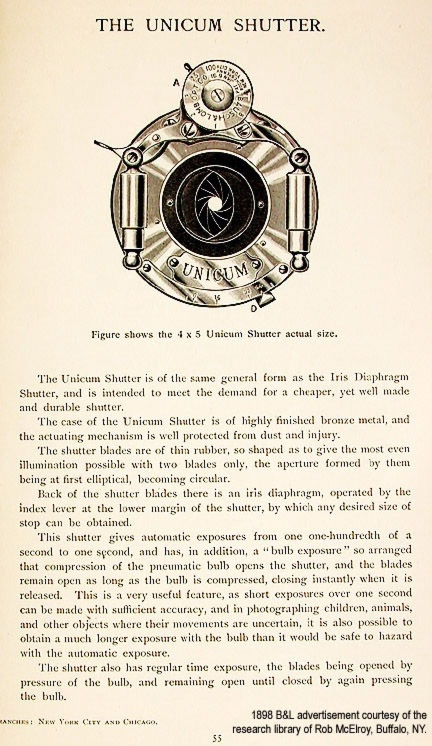
1898 Bausch & Lomb ad showing a shutter with B setting; the explanation displayed "bulb exposure" in quotation marks and explained it in detail, since the term was still novel.

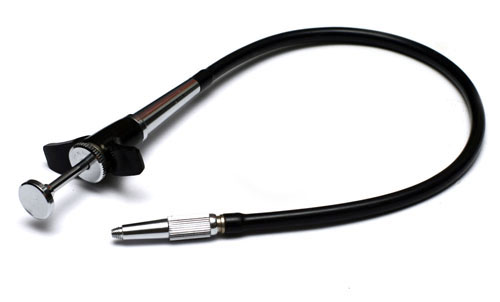
A more modern (circa 1950) camera cable release.

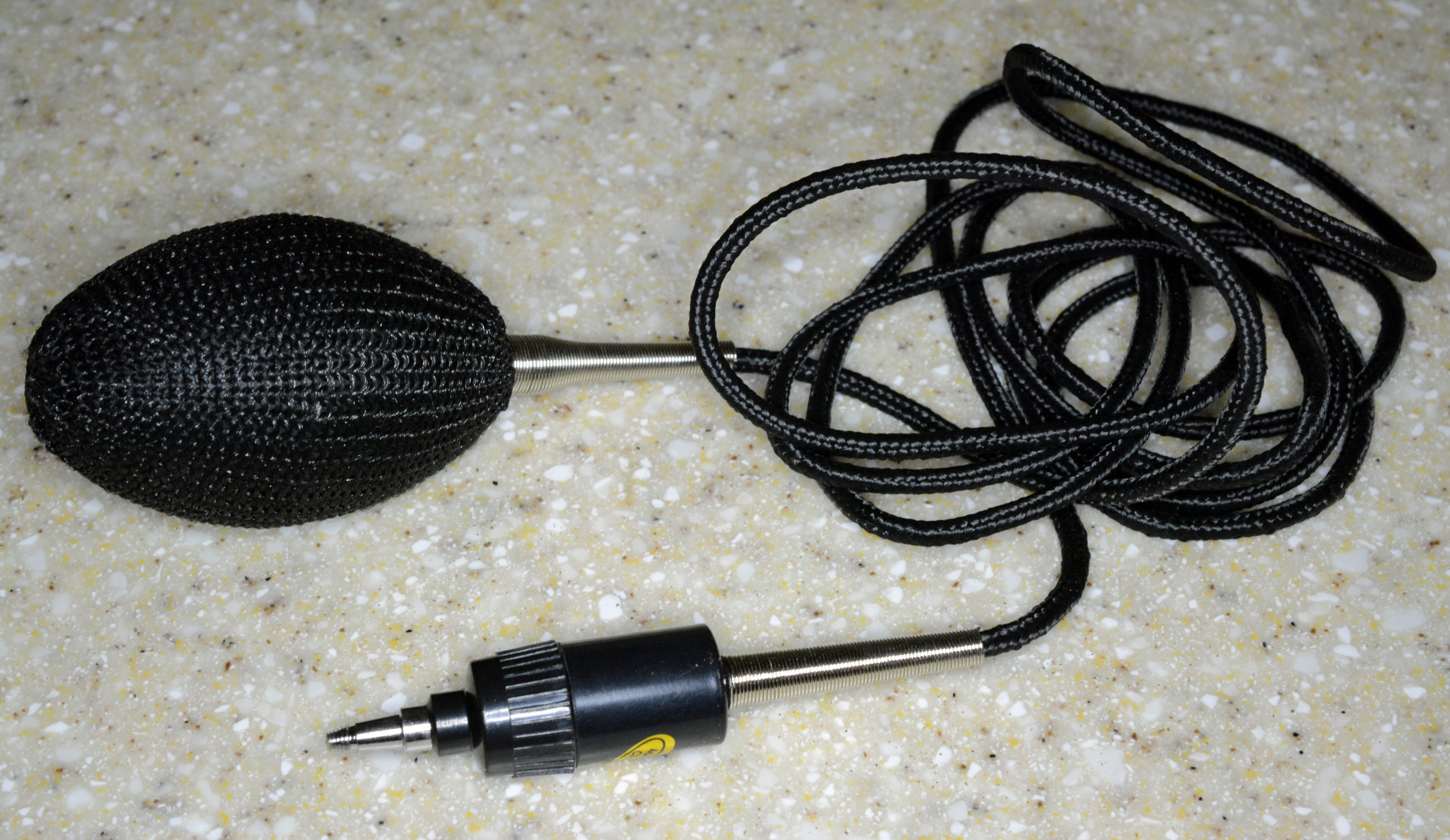
Squeeze the bulb to release the shutter

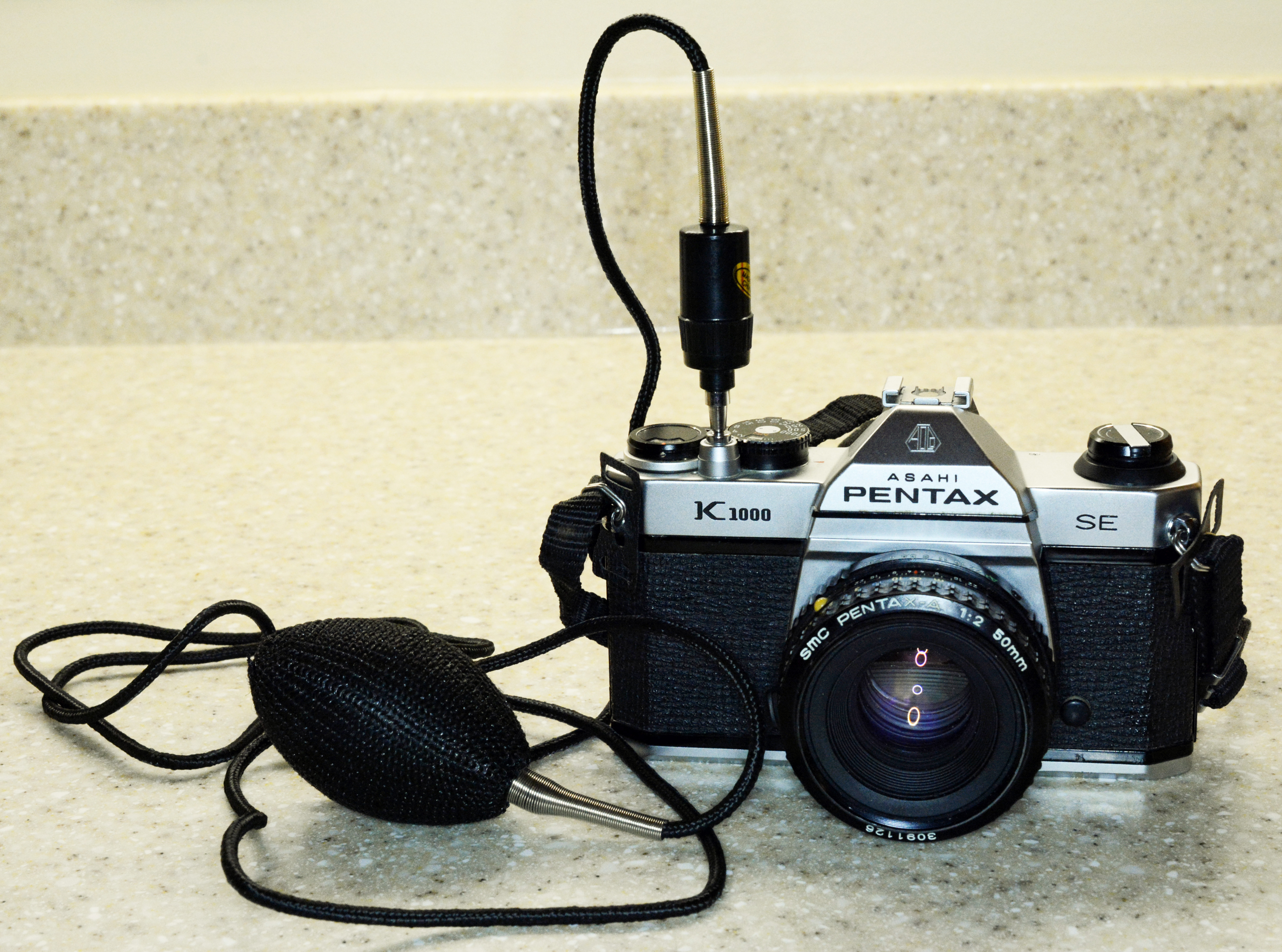
A bulb shutter release on a Pentax K1000 SE

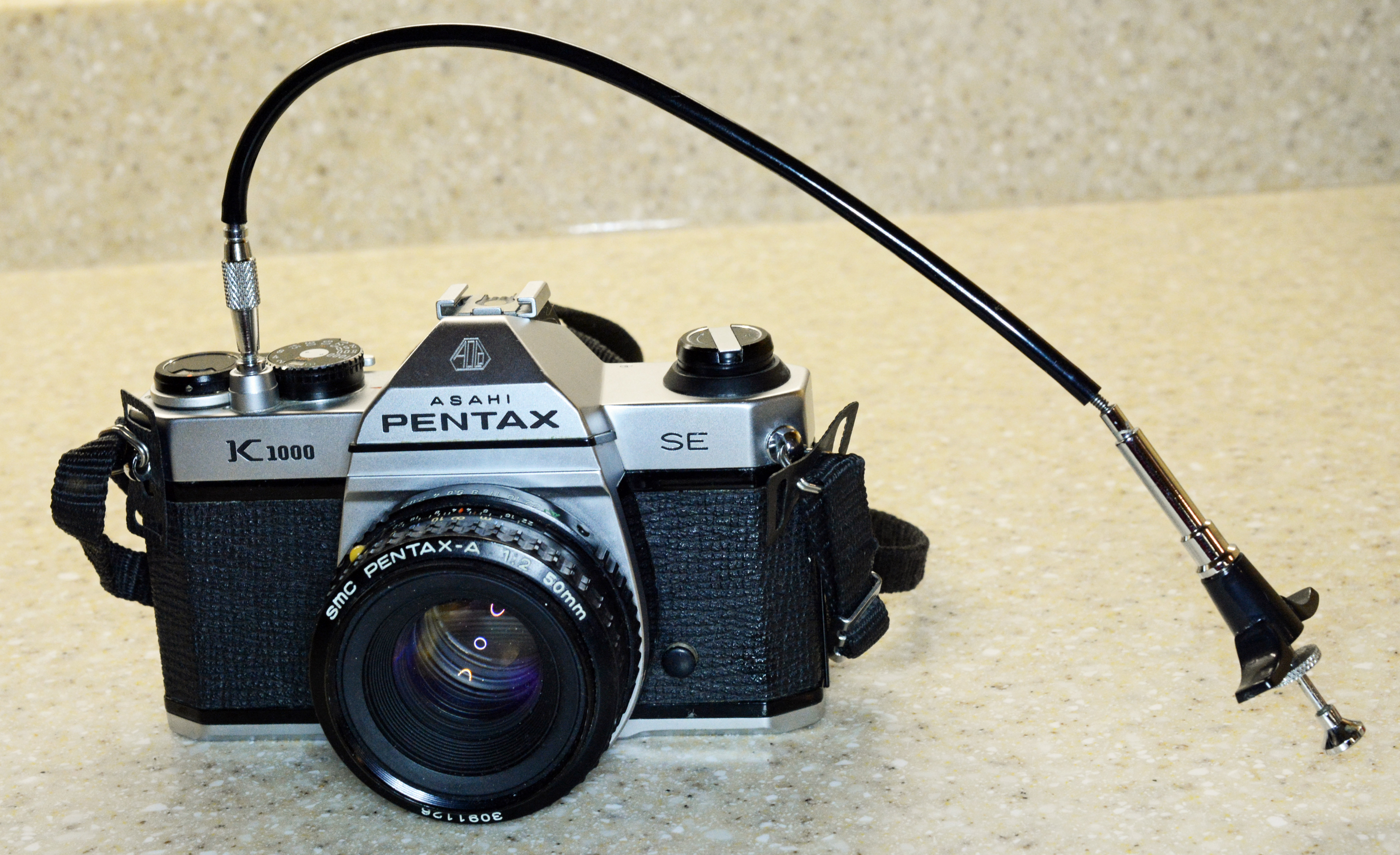
A cable shutter release on a Pentax K1000 SE

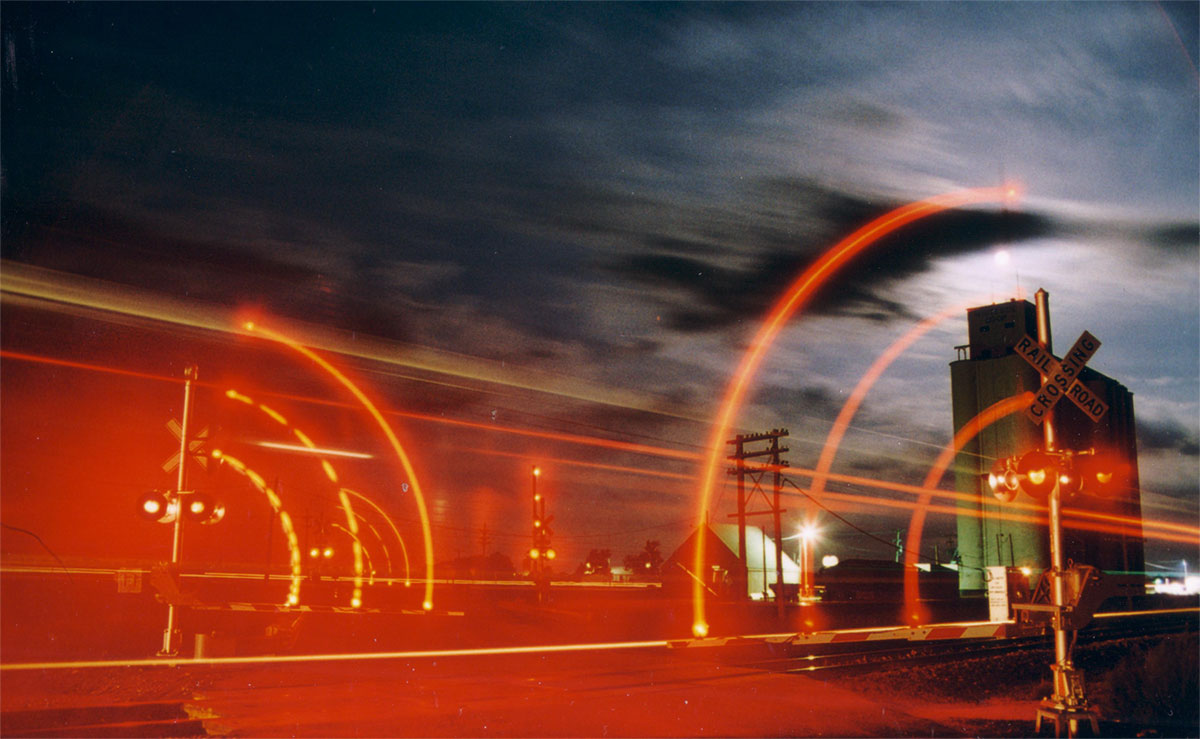
Photo shot with a Bulb exposure. The movement of the clouds, crossing arms and passing train register as streaks rather than sharp images, unlike the stationary objects in the frame.
