= Traffic camera =

Video camera observing vehicles on a road

A traffic camera is a video camera that observes vehicular traffic on a road. Typically, traffic cameras are put along major roads such as highways, freeways, expressways and arterial roads, and are connected by optical fibers buried alongside or under the road, with electricity provided either by mains power in urban areas, by solar panels or other alternative power sources, which provide consistent imagery without the threat of power outages. A monitoring center receives the live video in real-time, and serves as a dispatcher in the event of a traffic collision, some other disruptive incident, or a safety issue.

== Usage ==
Traffic cameras form a part of most intelligent transportation systems. They are especially valuable in tunnels, where safety equipment can be activated remotely based on information provided by the cameras and other sensors. On surface roads, they are typically mounted on high poles or masts, sometimes with street lights. On arterial roads, they are often mounted on traffic light poles at intersections, where problems are most likely. In remote areas beyond the electrical grid, they are usually powered by a renewable source such as solar power, which also provides a backup source to urban camera infrastructure.

Traffic cameras are distinct from road safety cameras, the latter of which are put in specific places to enforce rules of the road by taking still photos in a much higher image resolution upon a trigger. Traffic cameras are only for observation and continuously take lower-resolution video, often in full motion, though they may be remotely controlled to focus on an incident in the distance or at an orientation normally outside its field of view, such as a frontage road. Many transmit in analog television formats, though many are being converted to high definition or 4K resolution video as equipment is replaced. Some have a compass built in, which displays the cardinal direction at which the camera is aimed, although many installers also provide a reference image with the cardinal direction. These cameras are required to be able to resist weather conditions permanently.

A non-public use for traffic cameras is video tolling, where motorists drive through open road tolling gantries, have an image of their license plate taken, and are then billed after automatic number-plate recognition has read the license plate and cross-referenced it with motor vehicle databases.

Many transportation departments have linked their camera networks to the Internet so that travelers can view traffic conditions. They can show either streaming video or still imagery that refreshes at a set interval, helping travelers determine whether an alternate route should be taken. In the United States and Canada, these often are displayed on state or municipally-run 5-1-1 websites (511 being a telephone service relaying traffic information). These images can be combined with in-road sensors that measure traffic timing and mapping providers such as Google Maps/Waze that allow user-generated traffic information.

Many states and provinces consider this information public domain, thus many television stations air live traffic camera imagery during traffic reports on their local news broadcasts, or simply as a moving background during newscasts. Some cable TV systems provide these pictures full-time on a governmental access channel, and some broadcast stations set aside a full digital subchannel solely for traffic information and camera imagery, such as WMVT-DT3 in Milwaukee and WFMZ-DT2 in Allentown, Pennsylvania. In some cases, however, such as for toll roads and other private road authorities (e.g., the Illinois State Toll Highway Authority), these images are the property of the toll agency (or private company that runs a toll road), and are released exclusively to one station (e.g., ISTHA feeds only to WMAQ-TV).

== Gallery ==
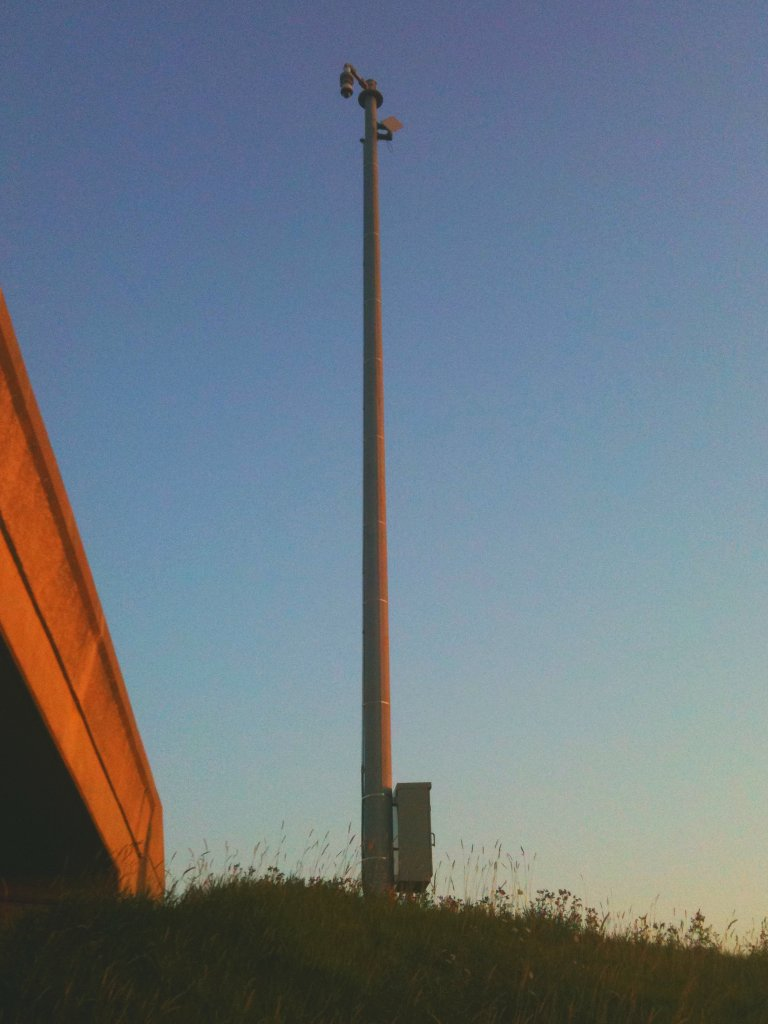
A Wisconsin Department of Transportation camera at Interstate 43 and Wisconsin Highway 28 in Sheboygan, Wisconsin; solar powered (link to current image).

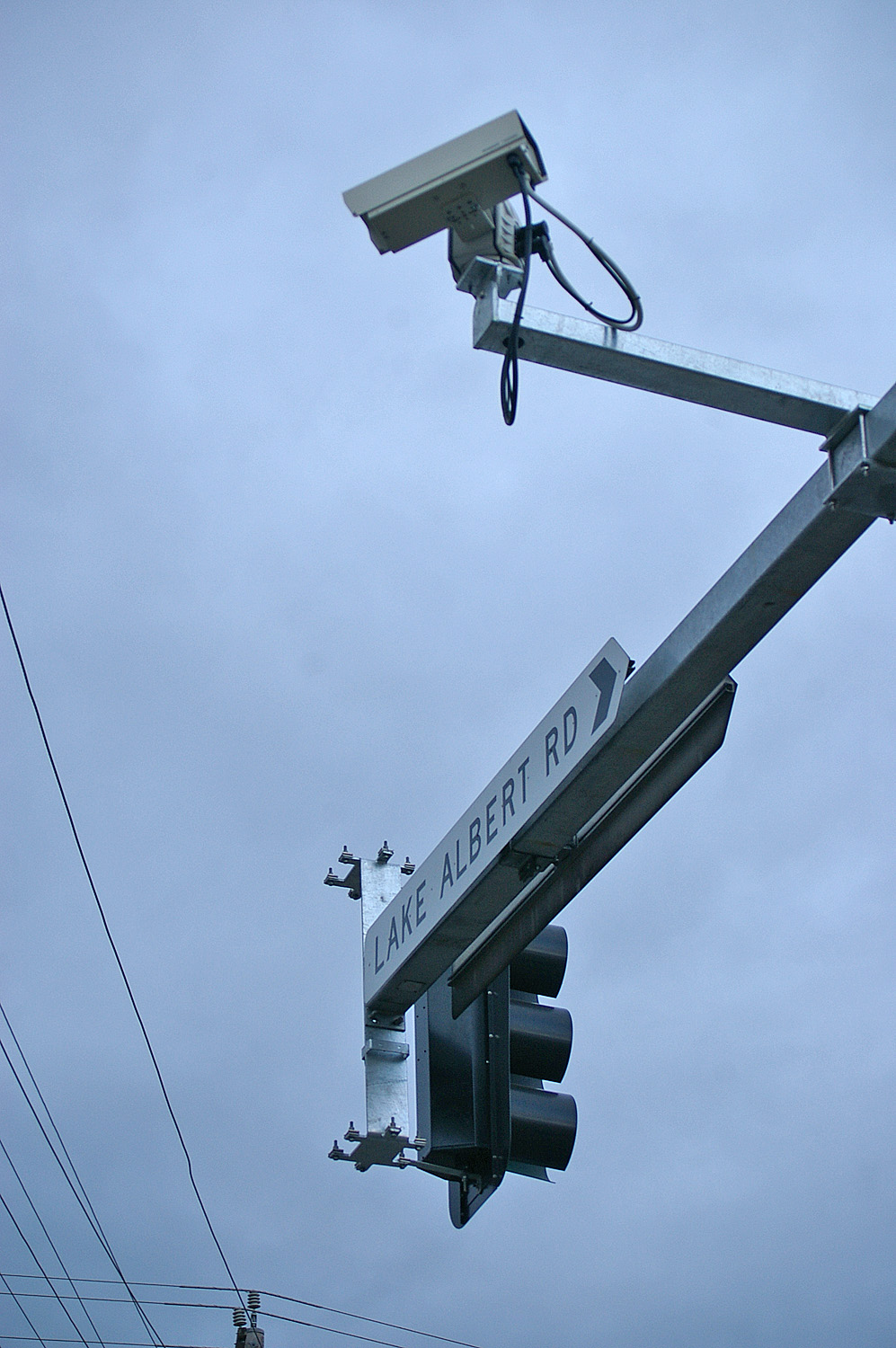
Traffic camera mounted on a traffic light pole at an intersection on the Sturt Highway in Wagga Wagga, Australia.

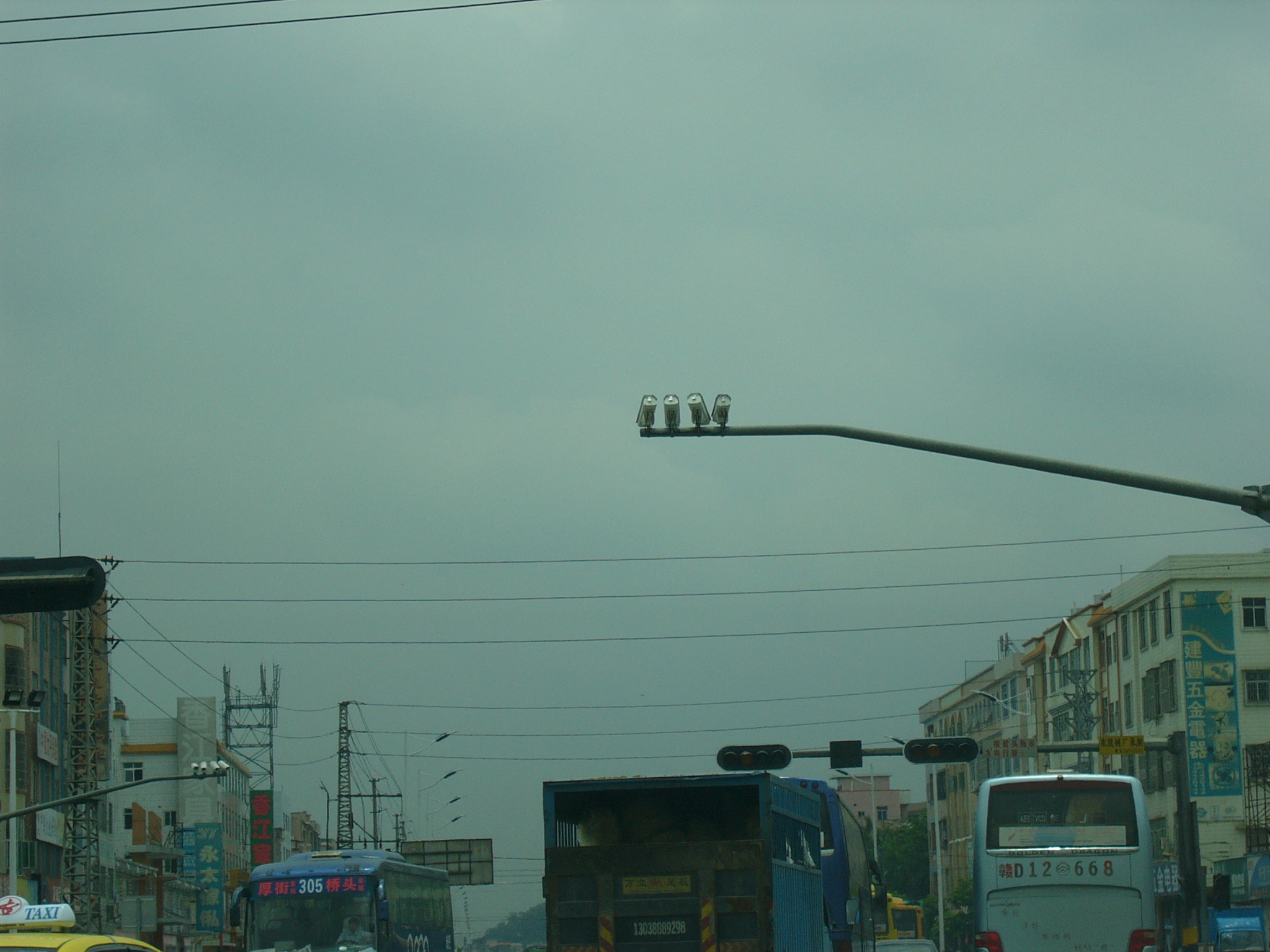
A set of traffic cameras in Dongguan, China.

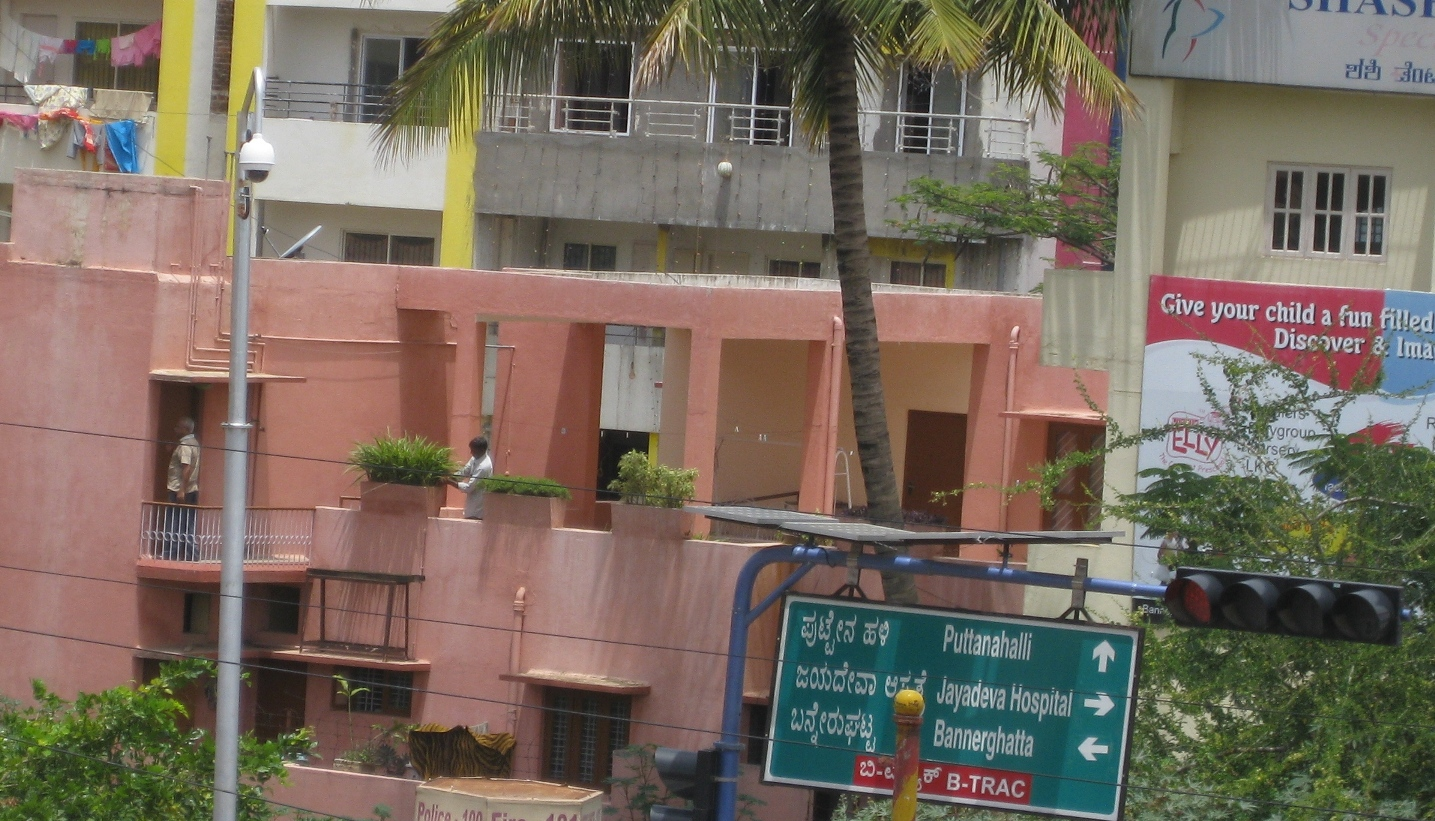
Traffic camera at Arekere junction on Bannerghatta Road. Footage is transmitted to the Bangalore Transport Information System website.

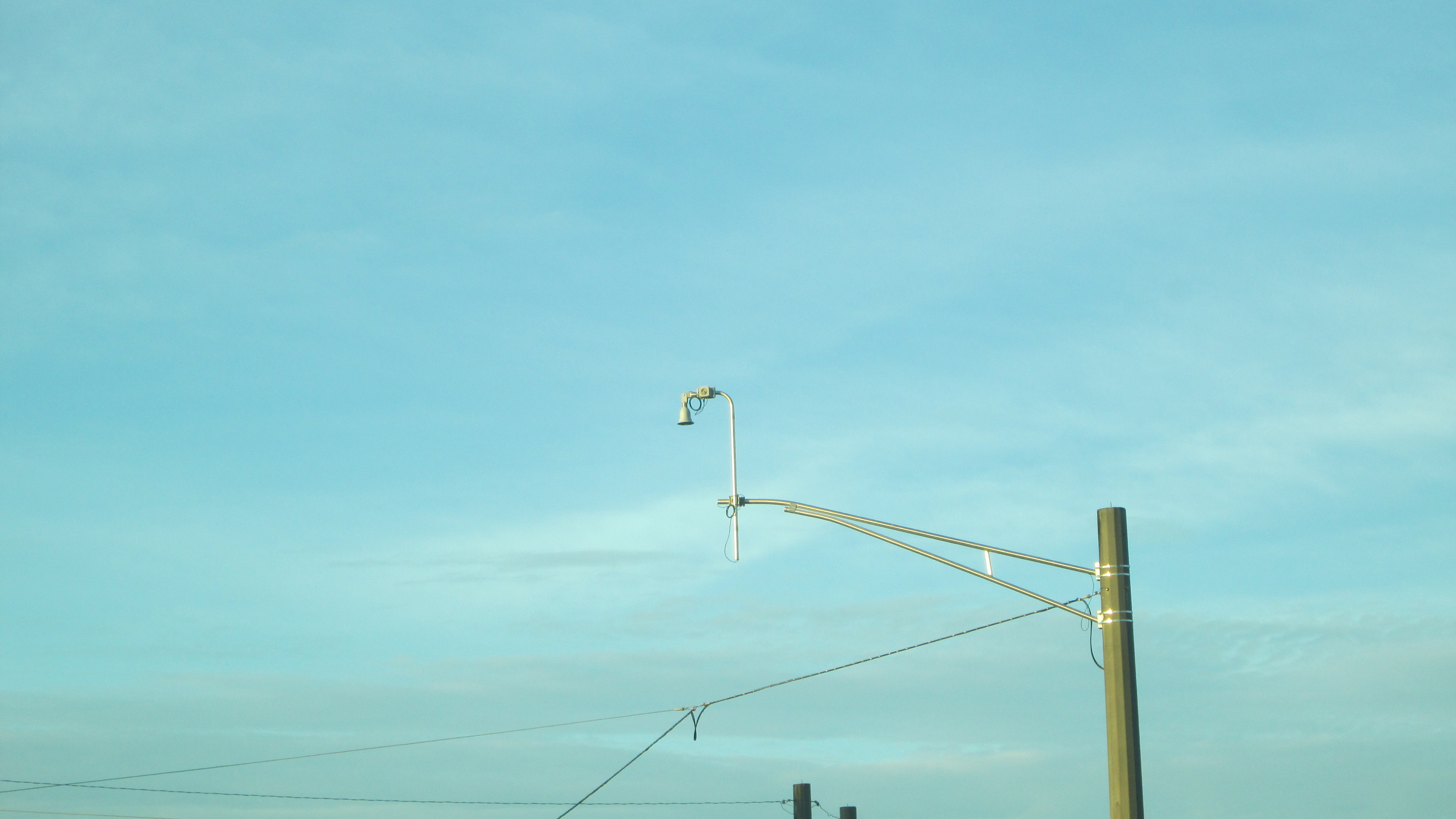
Highway scanner Almon Road, Covington, Georgia.

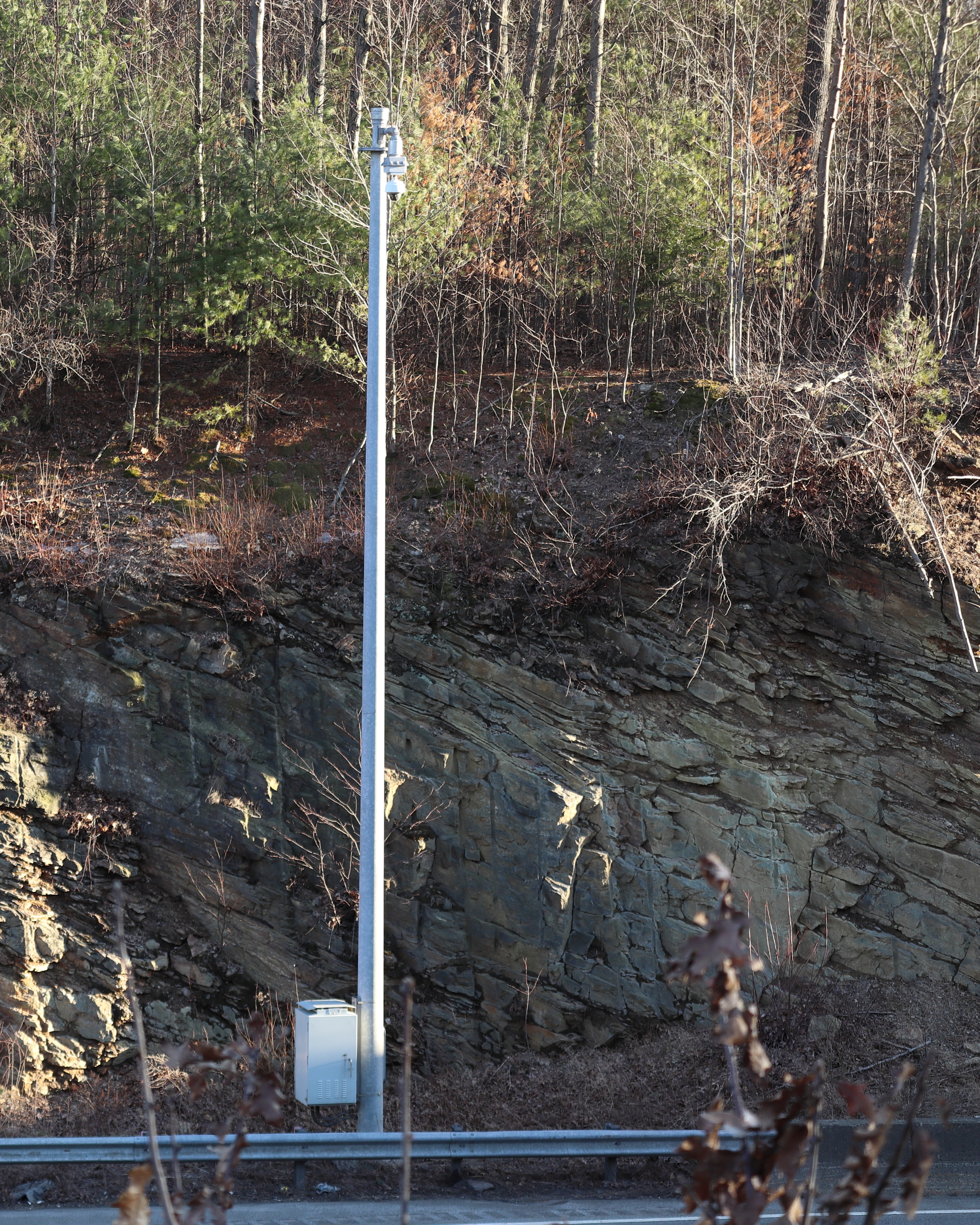
Dome camera mounted on pole monitoring traffic on the Massachusetts Turnpike.
