= Pentax Spotmatic =

Family of cameras by Asahi Optical Co. Ltd

Asahi Pentax Spotmatic
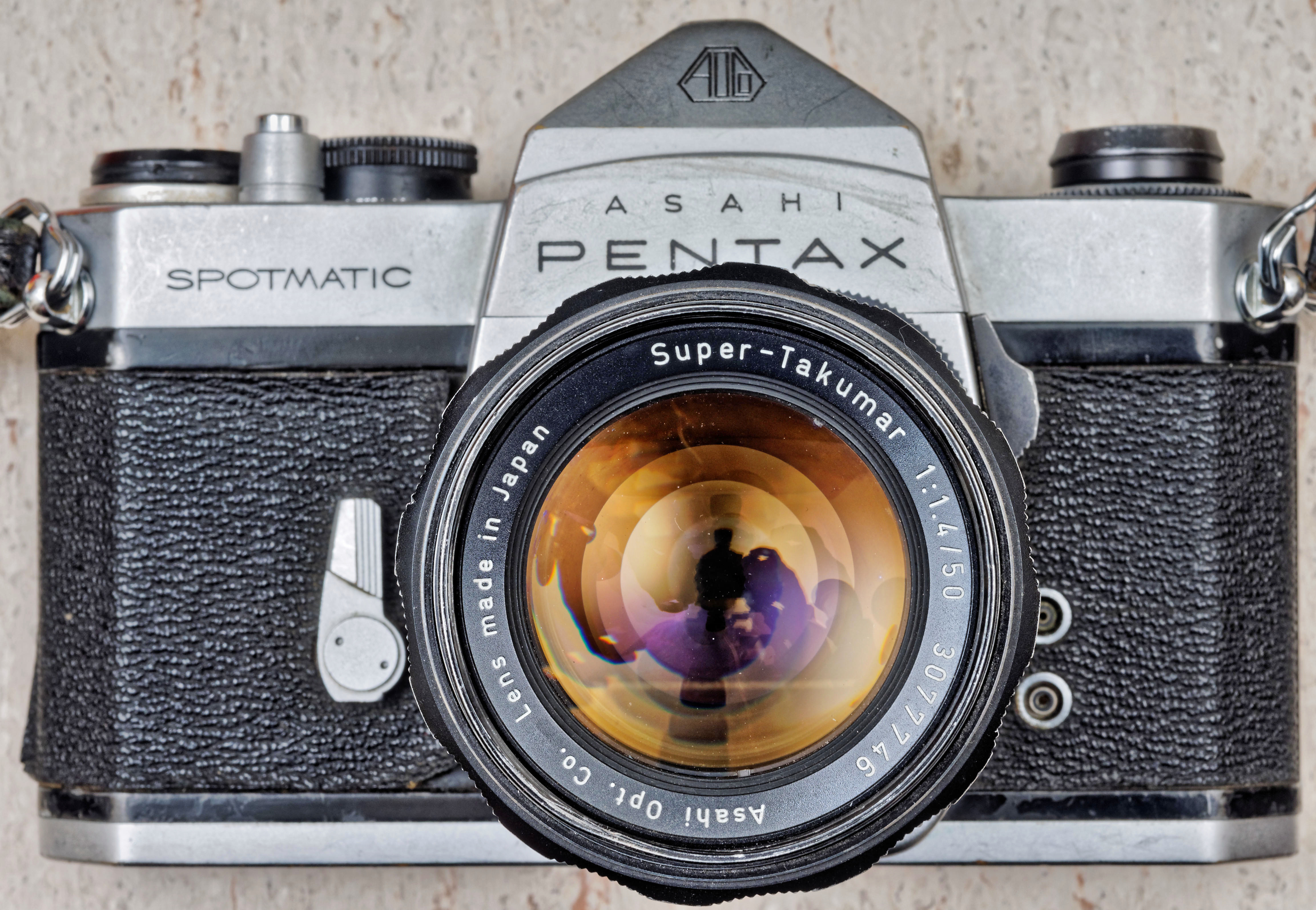
- Asahi Pentax Spotmatic

Overview
- Maker: Asahi Optical Co
- Type: SLR
- Released: 1964
- Production: 1964–1976

Lens
- Lens mount: M42 screw mount

Sensor/medium
- Sensor type: film
- Sensor size: 24 x 36 mm
- Film format: 35 mm
- Film speed: 20 - 1600
- Film speed detection: No

Focusing
- Focus: Manual focus

Exposure/metering
- Exposure: Manual exposure
- Exposure metering: Average, through the lens (TTL)

Flash
- Flash: FP or X
- Flash synchronization: 1/60

Shutter
- Shutter: Mechanical
- Shutter speed range: 1000 - 1, B

Viewfinder
- Viewfinder: pentaprism eye-level viewfinder with a microprism focusing screen

General
- Battery: Earlier model (SP) use RM400 battery; later models use PX625, but 1.5 V silver oxide batteries can be used due to bridge circuit
- Made in: Japan

The Pentax Spotmatic, originally marked the Asahi Pentax Spotmatic, refers to a family of 35mm single-lens reflex cameras manufactured by the Asahi Optical Co. Ltd., later known as Pentax Corporation, between 1964 and 1976.

All Pentax Spotmatics used the M42 screw-thread lens mount which was developed after World War II by Zeiss and Praktica. Asahi Optical used the name Takumar for their lenses. These were high-quality, progressively improved lenses, later versions of which featured multi-coating and were called Super Multi Coated Takumars.

The camera used Through The Lens (TTL) light metering, originally it was supposed to be a Spot meter but it ended up being a center-weighted meter. This camera allowed one to focus the lens at maximum aperture with a bright viewfinder image. After focusing, a switch on the side of the lens mount stopped the lens down and switched on the metering which the camera displayed with a needle located on the side of the viewfinder. The use of stop-down light metering was at the time revolutionary, but it limited the capability of the lightmeter, especially in low light situations.
Later models Spotmatic F, Electro Spotmatic, ES, and ESII were capable of open-aperture metering when used with Super Multi Coated (S-M-C) Takumar lenses with an aperture coupling prong in the lens mount.

Honeywell was the U.S. importer of the Spotmatic. Cameras officially imported by Honeywell were labeled Honeywell Pentax, instead of Asahi Pentax. The Spotmatic IIa was only available as a Honeywell Pentax; it was sold exclusively in the US and had an electronic interface for specific Honeywell Strobonar electronic flash units.

== History ==
The original 1964 Spotmatic was one of the first SLRs on the market to offer a through-the-lens (TTL) exposure metering system. The camera was presented as a prototype at photokina 1960, and was originally designed to use spot metering. Shortly before production Asahi decided that spot metering would be too difficult to use, and so the metering system was altered to use center-weighted average metering. The change took place too close to production to change the name, and so Spotmatic stuck. The camera had a mechanical shutter with speed range from 1000 to 1 and Bulb. The lightmeter is activated by a lever on the side of the camera, which also stopped down the lens. A Mercury battery (1.35 V Mallory RM640) was used to power the light metering system; however due to the way the circuit is designed, 1.5 V silver oxide batteries can be used instead.

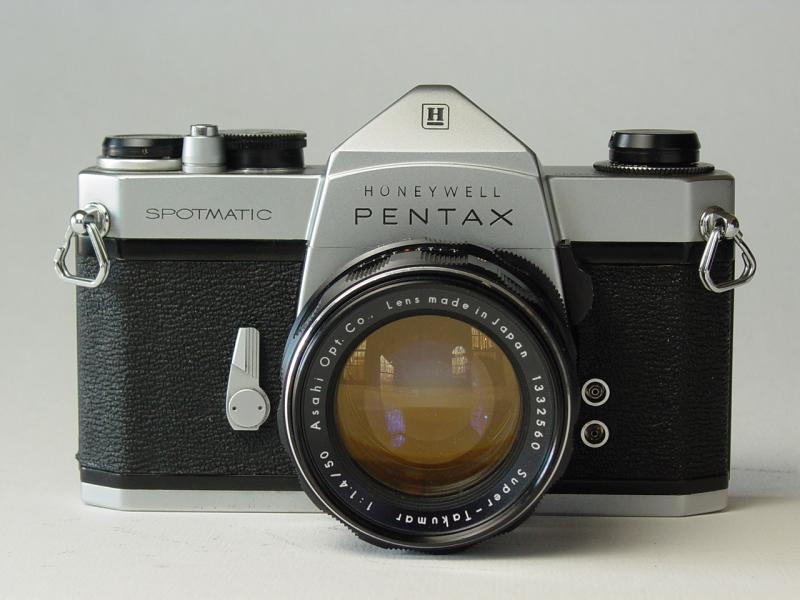
Honeywell Spotmatic SP face view

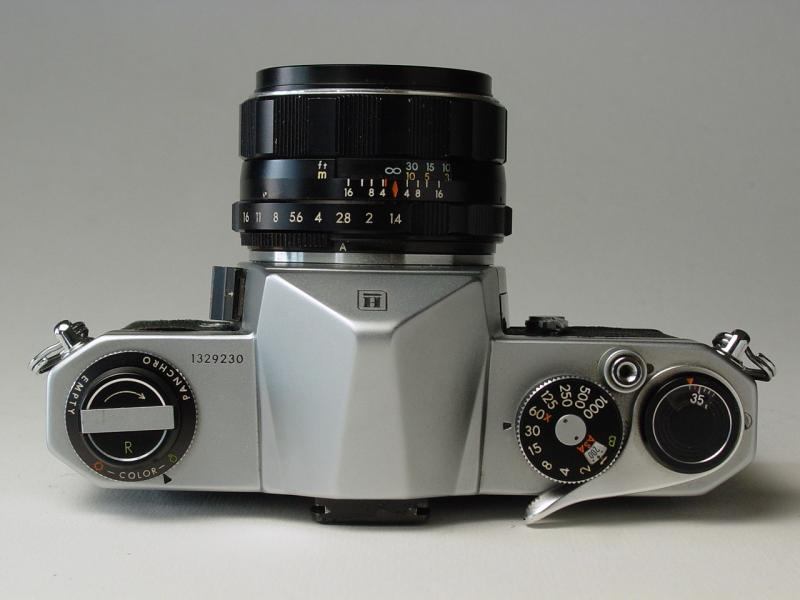
Honeywell Spotmatic SP top view

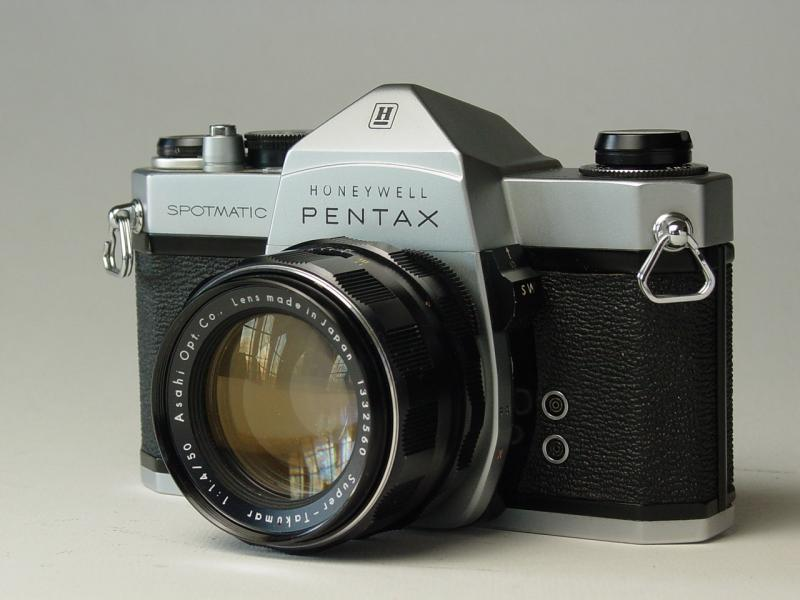
Honeywell Spotmatic SP side view

== Model range and variations ==
- Asahi Pentax Spotmatic (1964)
- Asahi Pentax Spotmatic SL (1968)
- Asahi Pentax Spotmatic SP 500 (1971)
- Asahi Pentax Spotmatic SP II (1971)
- Honeywell Pentax Spotmatic SP IIa (1971)
- Asahi Pentax Electro-Spotmatic (1971)
- Asahi Pentax Spotmatic F (1973)
- Asahi Pentax ES II (1973)
- Asahi Pentax Spotmatic SP1000 (1974)

The model range includes the original Spotmatic (SP), which had an accessory "cold" shoe for flash

Two budget models: the SP500 and SP1000 were also available and some features from the original Spotmatic were removed. The fastest shutter speeds were designated by the model number, the SP500 having a top speed of 1/500 s and the SP1000 having a top speed of 1/1000 s. Users discovered the SP500 shutter speed dial has an unmarked stop where the 1/1000 speed is. These two models had no self-timer. There was also the Pentax SL, which was identical to the Spotmatic except that it did not have the built-in light meter.

The Spotmatic II (SPII) heralded the arrival of the SMC lenses. Among some improvements were better metering system (Max ASA was increased to 3200) and film transport. A hot shoe for flash was added and the synchronization (FP or X) was placed on a dial switch located below the rewind crank.

Spotmatic IIa was made exclusively for the American market. It was made to couple with the Honeywell Strobonar electronic flashes using an electronic eye that was located at the top-left of the camera.

In 1971 the Electro-Spotmatic was the first aperture-priority, electronic, automatic SLR but was only sold in Japan. It success was followed by the ES sold internationally from 1972. The ES had standardized and improved circuitry that addressed reliability issues in the original version. Two years later it was followed by the ES II. Special models could be special ordered with accessories such as Motor Drive, Data Back, etc.

In 1973 the Spotmatic F joined the line. This camera, together with a revamped line of Super Multi Coated (S-M-C) Takumar had the capability of metering without stopping the lens down.

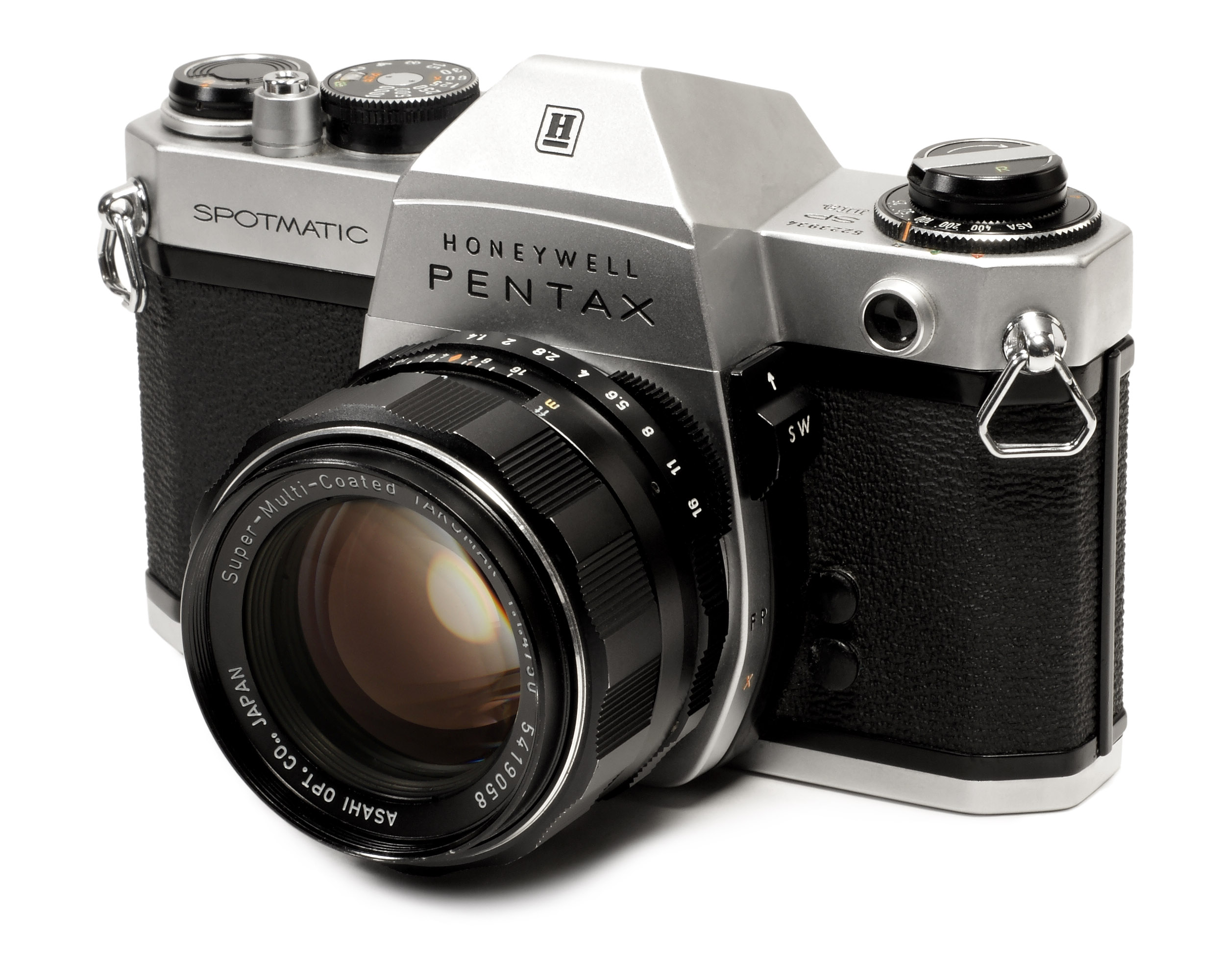
Spotmatic IIa

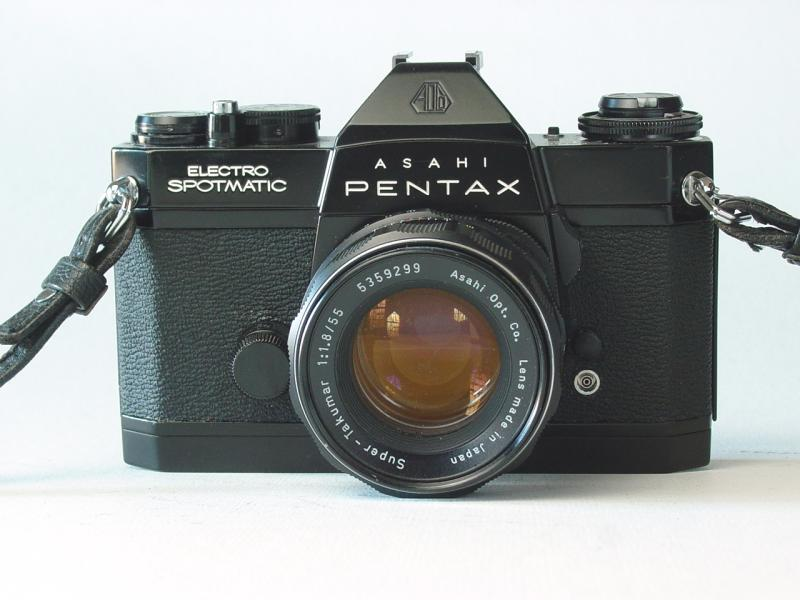
Electro Spotmatic

== Legacy ==
The Pentax Spotmatic chassis was the basis for the Pentax K2, KX, KM and K1000 models with bayonet mount.

== Noted users ==
Noted users of the Pentax Spotmatic include:

- American poet and photographer Ira Cohen.
- The British band The Beatles (most notably Ringo Starr)
- Australian photographer Carol Jerrems.
