= USS Trigger =

Two ships of the United States Navy have borne the name USS Trigger, named in honor of the triggerfish, any of numerous deep-bodied fishes of warm seas having an anterior dorsal fin with two or three stout erectile spines.

- The first USS Trigger (SS-237) was a Gato-class submarine commissioned in 1942 and sunk in 1945.
- The second USS Trigger (SS-564) was a Tang-class submarine, commissioned in 1952, stricken in 1973 and sold to Italy.
