= Pentax K1000 =

1976 35mm single-lens reflex camera

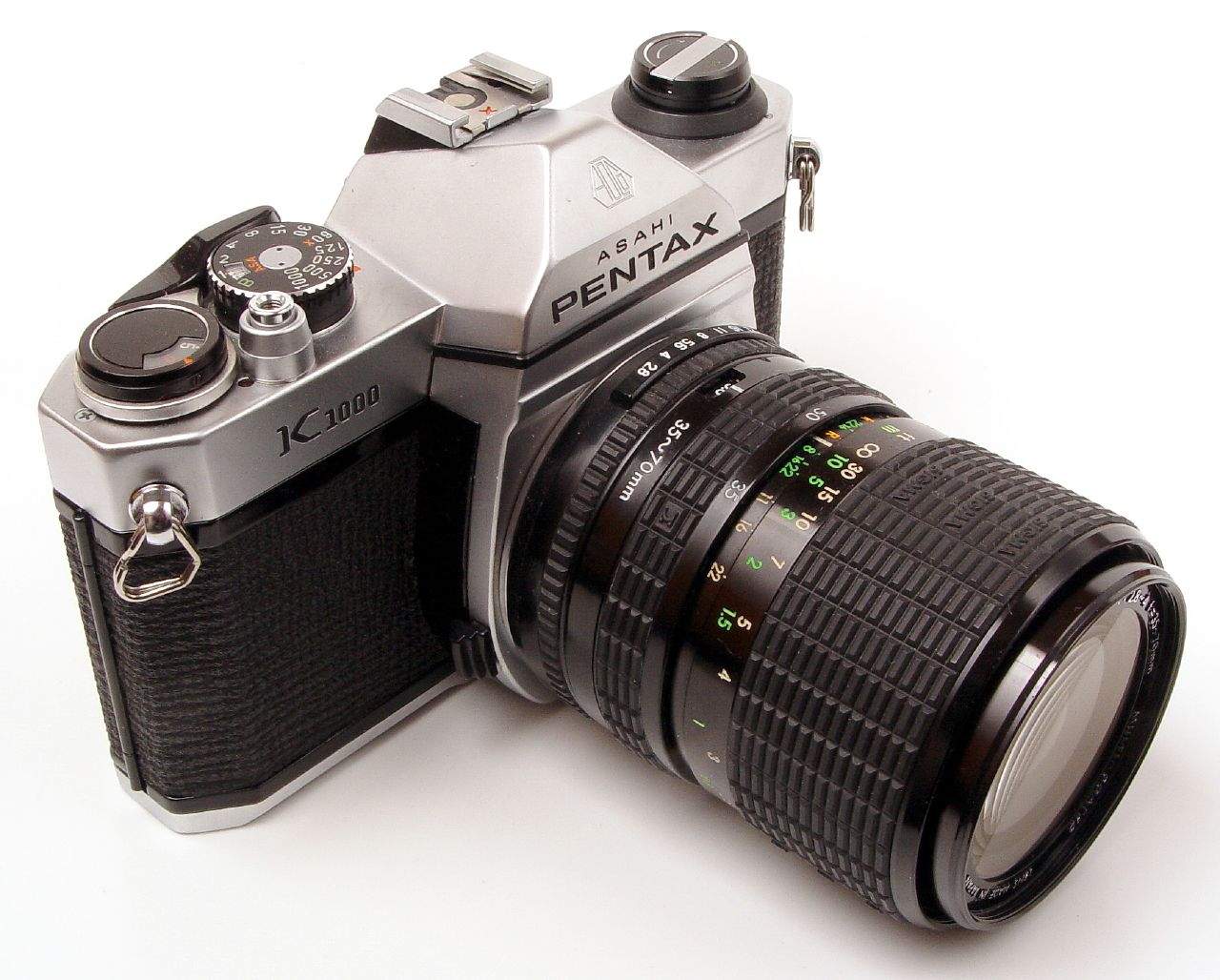

Overview
- Maker: Asahi Optical Co., Ltd.
- Type: 35 mm SLR
- Production: 1976–1997

Lens
- Lens mount: Pentax K bayonet mount

Focusing
- Focus: Manual focus

Exposure/metering
- Exposure: manual exposure set and built-in cadmium sulfide (CdS) light meter

Flash
- Flash: Hot shoe

General
- Made in: Japan, Hong Kong, China

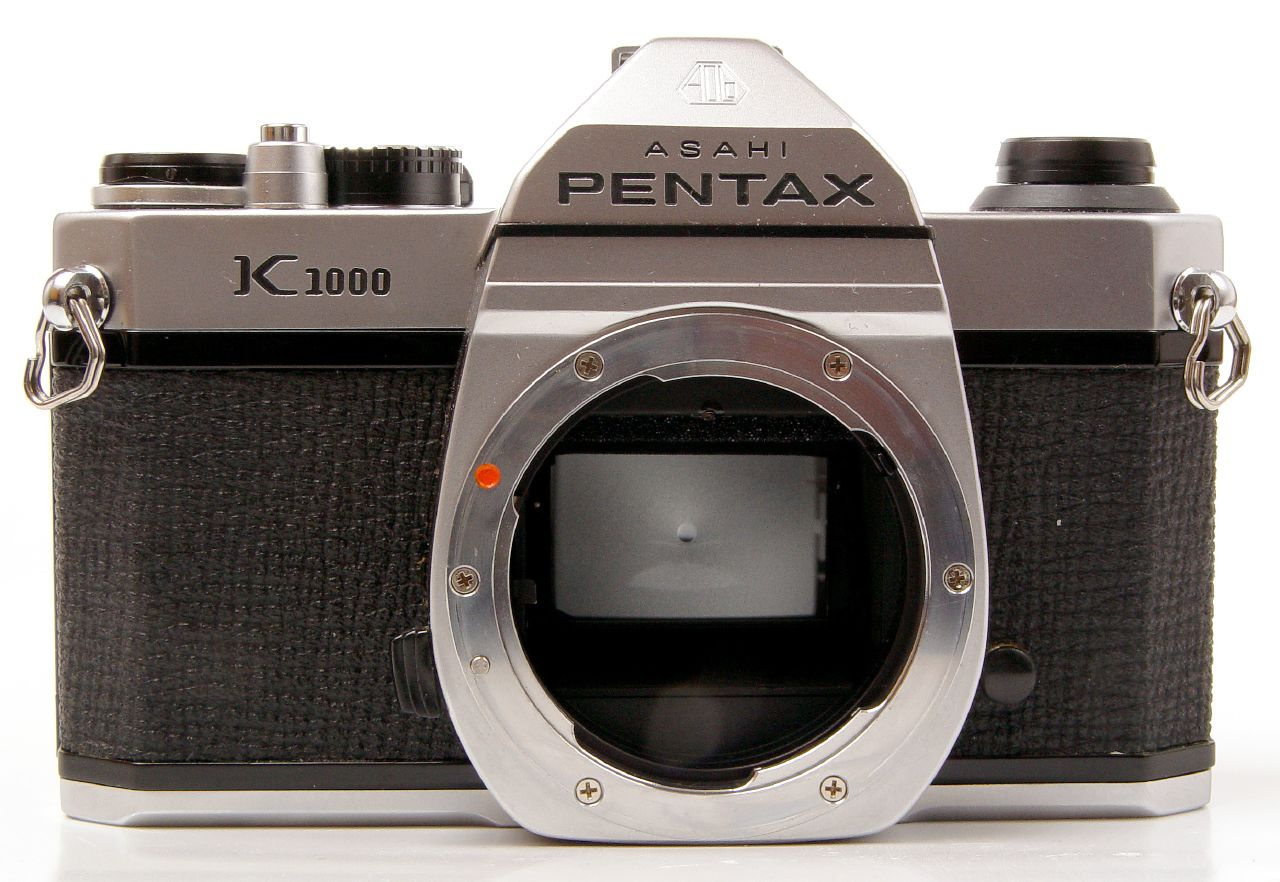
Without lens, showing the K mount and mirror.

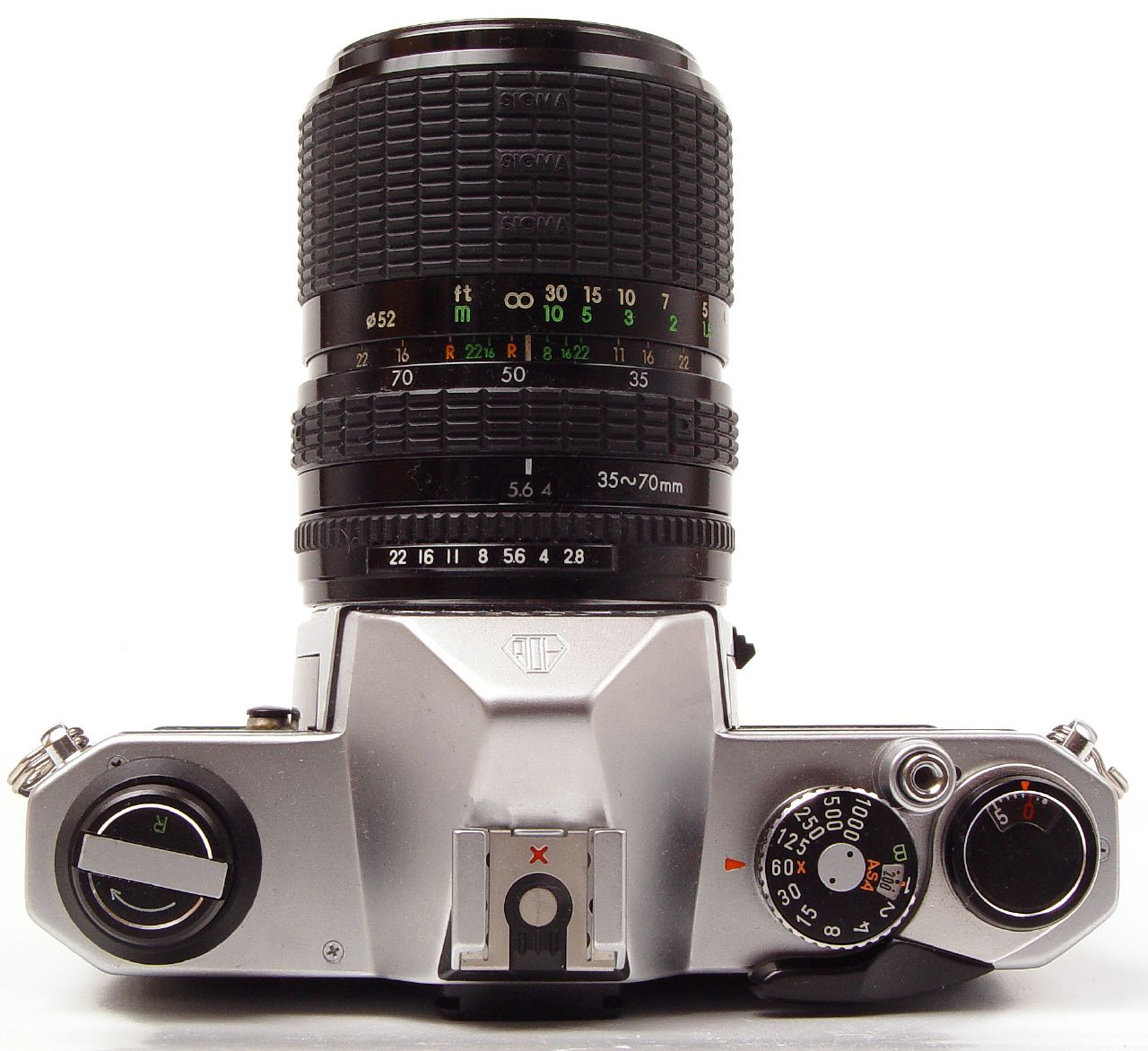
Top view, showing the controls.

The Pentax K1000 (originally marked the Asahi Pentax K1000) is an interchangeable lens, 35 mm film, single-lens reflex (SLR) camera, manufactured by Asahi Optical Co., Ltd. from 1976 to 1997, originally in Japan. The Pentax K1000 eventually sold over three million units.

== Description ==
The K1000, introduced in 1976, is the simplest member of Asahi Optical's Pentax K-series 35mm SLRs. The other members are the Pentax K2, KM, and KX, introduced in 1975, and the K2 DMD of 1976. All have the same basic body design, but with differing feature levels, electronics, and controls. The K1000 was the KM with the self-timer, depth of field pre-view and some other features removed to save cost.

It uses a horizontal travel, rubberized silk cloth focal plane shutter with a speed range of 1/1000 second to 1 second, along with Bulb and a flash X-sync of 1/60 second. It is 91.4 millimetres (3.6 inches) tall, 143 mm (5.6 in) wide, and 48 mm (1.9 in) deep, and weighs 620 grams (21.9 ounces). The body was finished in black leather with chrome trim only, although early production Pentax K1000 SE bodies had brown leather with chrome trim.

The introductory US list price for the K1000 body with SMC Pentax 55 mm f/2 lens was $299.50. In 1983, a K1000 with SMC Pentax-M 50 mm f/2 lens listed for $220; in 1988, the body was $210, but $290 with SMC Pentax-A 50 mm f/2; in 1993, the body was $263. The body was priced at $315 in 1994 and remained there until discontinued. Note that SLRs usually sold for 30 to 40 percent below list price.

== Features ==
The K1000 is an almost-all metal, mechanically (springs, gears, levers) controlled, manual-focus SLR with manual-exposure control. It is completely operable without batteries. Batteries are only required (one A76 or S76, or LR44 or SR44, silver oxide 357 or 303) for the light metering information in the viewfinder. This consists of a centre-the-needle exposure control system using a galvanometer needle pointer moving between vertically arranged +/– over/underexposure markers to indicate the readings of the built-in full-scene averaging, cadmium sulfide (CdS)battery light meter versus the actual camera settings. The meter does not have an on/off switch and the lens cap must be attached to the lens to prevent draining the K1000's battery when it is not in use. The K1000 comes with its own simple, black camera strap out of the box. Conventional for the time, there is a film advance lever on the right and a rewind crank on the left on the top plate.

There is a basic hot shoe for an electronic flash unit, and also a PC flash lead socket, of X type synchronisation. There are no flash dedication features.

The viewfinder has a focusing screen with a microprism spot focusing aid. The Pentax K1000 SE substituted a split image rangefinder plus microprism collar focusing screen. Later (non-Asahi) SE models had top and bottom plates made from plastic, painted to look like metal. The K1000 SE is otherwise identical to the regular K1000, except that the SE's from the first two years of production in late 1977 to 1978 used a Black Diamond patterned leatherette (Pre 780XXX serial number) for approximately 2500 units and then a brown leather instead of black after that on the later early SE models.

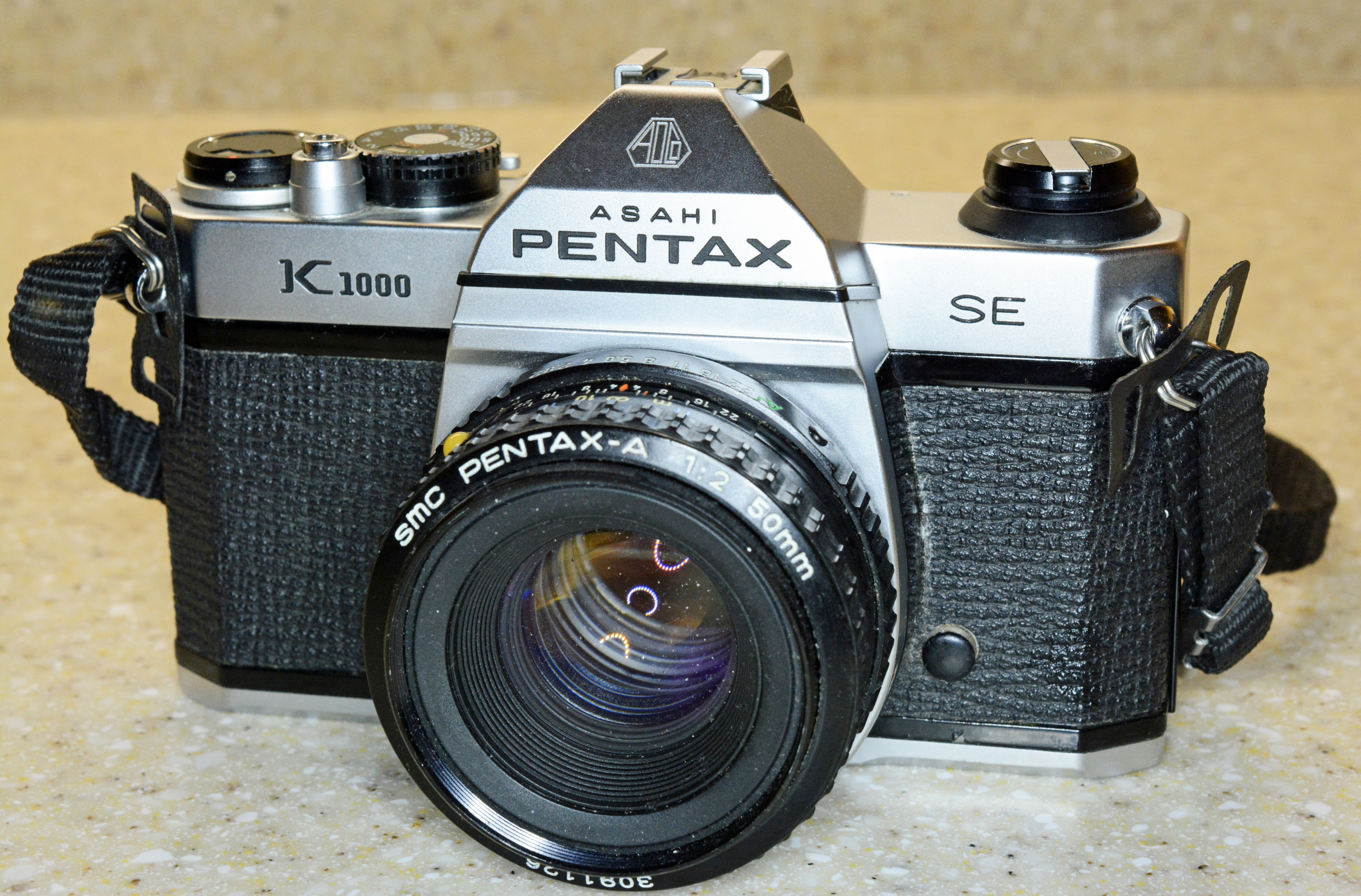
A Pentax K1000 SE with an SMC 50 mm f/2 lens

The K1000 has a Pentax K bayonet mount, a type introduced with the K Series. Originally it was usually sold with the budget SMC Pentax 50 mm f/2 lens, and it accepts any other manual focus lens with the K mount. This includes the SMC Pentax, SMC Pentax-M and SMC Pentax-A types. In addition, almost all lenses with the Pentax K-AF and K-AF2 autofocus lens mounts (introduced 1987 and 1991, respectively) also work in manual focus mode. The exceptions are Pentax's newest SMC-Pentax FA J (1997) and SMC-Pentax DA (2004) types which lack an aperture control ring, and K mount lenses designed for APS-C cameras; these can be mounted but with restricted functionality. There are also adaptors to allow older screw mount lenses to be used on K mount cameras (with limitations). In all, there are vast numbers of Pentax and third party lenses that can be used with the K1000 and other K mount camera bodies.

As a budget camera, the K1000 has fewer features than other mid-1970s SLRs. In particular it lacks a self timer, which can limit its appeal to family users. The sparse information in the viewfinder can make taking photos a little ponderous, as the camera might need to be removed from the eye to check settings, on top of which the meter is slow to respond, even by 1976 standards. The K1000 is a completely manual camera, requiring more expertise in use than some of its contemporaries.

The K1000 gained popularity because of its low cost, and then for the reputation it won for ruggedness and reliability. Its spartan lack of certain features are regarded by some as a good feature in itself. In addition, for many years it was the camera recommended or mandated to students starting art or photography courses, because its manual controls forced users to learn about exposure - even after better (and even cheaper) manual cameras came along. Today, good used versions fetch higher prices than its originally more costly and better featured K Series siblings, partly because those others, made in far fewer numbers, are overlooked or have been forgotten.

== Design history ==
In 1975, Asahi Optical replaced its Spotmatic series of 35mm SLR cameras with three cameras of the K-series, the Pentax K2, KM and KX. They continued the successful Spotmatics' general style and handling but with the use of a new bayonet mount, the K Mount, in place of the previous M42 screw mount. The KM in particular was otherwise identical to the old Spotmatic F model apart from some top plate styling. The top of the range K2 had an aperture priority auto and manual modes, while the KX and KM were metered manual only, but the K2 and KX were more technically advanced than the KM. A range of SMC Pentax K mount lenses were introduced at the same time.

These three original K-Series cameras had relatively short production lives, because at that time the market trend was towards much smaller cameras, led by the Olympus OM-1, and away from heavy mechanical cameras - robust and reliable though they were. At the same time electronics was beginning to revolutionise camera design, and buyers were increasingly expecting automation in place of (or in addition to) manual metering. In 1976 Asahi therefore introduced the first of its small M-Series of 35mm SLRs and soon the M-Series had become the Pentax mid-range cameras. But, to salvage something from the K-Series, Asahi added features to the K2 to create the professional grade K2-DMD, and removed features from the KM to create the K1000 aimed at the lower end of the market; in both these markets the fashion for smallness was of less concern.

The K1000 was therefore a Spotmatic F with a K mount, but with the self-timer, depth of field preview, film reminder dial, and the FP flash socket (by now redundant) removed. In creating it, Asahi achieved their aim of making the cheapest big-brand 35mm SLR on the market, on its introduction at least. The "1000" in the K1000's name was a reflection of the camera's fastest shutter speed. This follows from the naming of the previous Spotmatic cameras, the SP1000 and SP500, which had top speeds of 1/1000 and 1/500 respectively.

Production continued until 1997 when manufacturing costs of its older design and supply of its mechanical and electronic parts (especially precision analogue microgalvanometers for the light meter) finally became untenable. It was replaced by the highly computerized Pentax ZX-M (also called MZ-M) in 1998.

== Changes ==
Production of the largely hand assembled camera was moved from Japan, first to Hong Kong in 1978 and then to China in 1990, to keep labor costs down. The "Asahi" name and "AOCo" logo was removed from the pentaprism cover to de-emphasize the company name in keeping with the rest of the "Pentax" line. The meter components changed as Asahi Optical searched for suitable supplies. The metal in the wind shaft was downgraded from steel. Cheaper plastic was substituted for the originally satin-chromed brass top and bottom plates and aluminum and steel film rewind assembly. Note that the use of lighter plastic lowered the weight of the Chinese-assembled K1000s to 525 g.

== See also ==
- Pentax cameras

Class	1970s										1980s										1990s										2000s									
Class	0	1	2	3	4	5	6	7	8	9	0	1	2	3	4	5	6	7	8	9	0	1	2	3	4	5	6	7	8	9	0	1	2	3	4	5	6	7	8	9
Flagship																						PZ-1 (Z-1)			PZ-1p (Z-1p)							MZ-S								
Flagship																									PZ-5p (Z-5p)															
Flagship											LX																													
Flagship							MX																																	
Flagship						K2 DMD																																		
Flagship						K2																																		
Midrange																		SFX (SF-1)			SFXn (SF-1n)							MZ-3 (ZX-3)				MZ-6 (ZX-L, MZ-L)								
Midrange																	P5 (P50)									MZ-5 (ZX-5)		MZ-5n (ZX-5n)												
Midrange														Super-A (Super Program)										PZ-20p (Z-20p)						MZ-7 (ZX-7)										
Midrange														Program-A (Program Plus)										Z-50p				MZ-50 (ZX-50)			MZ-30 (ZX-30)		MZ-60 (ZX-60)							
Midrange						KX						ME F														PZ-70p (Z-70p)														
Midrange							ME			ME Super																														
Entry-level																			SF7 (SF10)								MZ-10 (ZX-10)							*ist						
Entry-level																							PZ-20 (Z-20)			PZ-70 (Z-70)														
Entry-level																						PZ-10 (Z-10)																		
Entry-level																P3 (P30)			P3n (P30n)		P3t (P30t)								MZ-M (ZX-M)											
Entry-level						KM				MV	MV 1		MG			A3 (A3000)																								
Entry-level							K1000																																	
