= Triggered =

Triggered may refer to:

- Triggered (book), a 2019 non-fiction book by Donald Trump Jr.
- Triggered (film), a 2020 South African action-horror film
- "Triggered (Freestyle)", a song by American singer Jhené Aiko

== See also ==
- Trigger (disambiguation)
- Remotely triggered earthquakes
