= Image trigger =

An image trigger initiates the capture of single or multiple frames of a digital camera by analysing the signals of its sensor.

For capturing and analysing of fast moving objects (e.g. as in quality control of production lines) modern high speed cameras are frequently used. Typically the initiation of an image-series starts as soon as the object is entirely visible in the field of the camera.

By using a so-called "image trigger" this task can be done much faster and more accurately, without the cost and effort of additional equipment as in standard methods (for instance, via cable release).

The on-board "ImageBLITZ" image trigger uses the live picture of the camera itself as a flexible and accurate sensor, with the result that the process synchronisation takes care of itself.

By using CMOS cameras (which provide the information of every single pixel in digitized form) a fast processing of the supplied data is ensured. To prepare the ImageBLITZ, a line segment of a predefined length is set up in the field of view, just where the triggering event is likely to take place. Then the amount of grey level alteration (and its direction from dark to bright or reverse) is set, as well as the minimum number of affected pixels.

At each triggering event the camera head now sends a frame (or a set of frames) to the host computer to be processed or archived for further use.

== See also ==
- Bulb (photography)
- Shutter button
