= Panasonic Lumix DMC-LF1 =

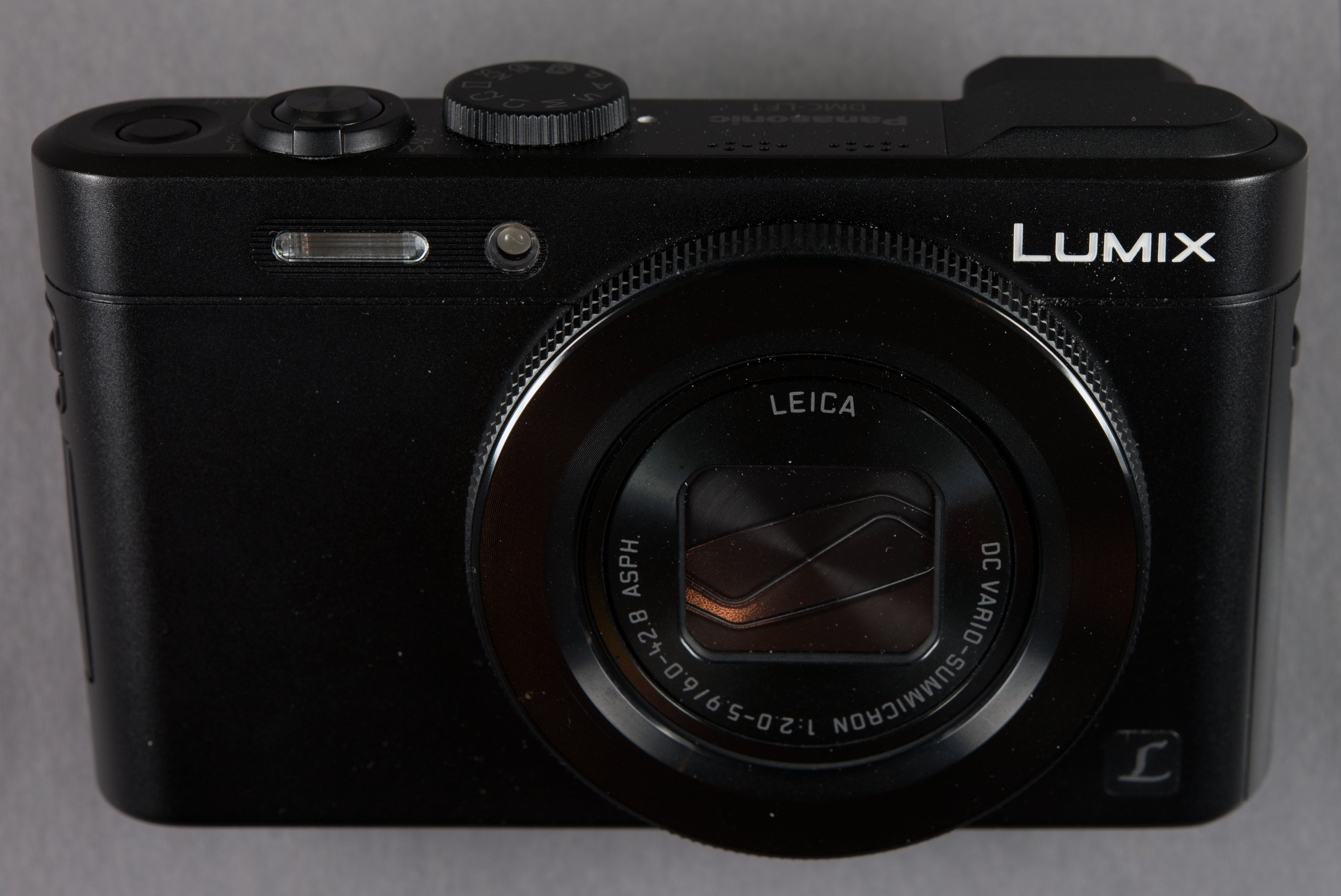

Overview
- Maker: Panasonic Lumix
- Released: 2013

Lens
- Lens mount: LEICA DC VARIO-SUMMICRON
- F-numbers: 2.0 - 5.9

Sensor/medium
- Sensor type: MOS
- Sensor size: 12.1 megapixels
- Storage media: SD, SDHC, SDXC

Flash
- Flash: built-in

General
- LCD screen: 3.0" TFT Screen LCD
- Battery: Li-ion Battery Pack (3.7V 950mAh 3.6Wh)
- Dimensions: 102.5×62.1×27.9 mm (4.04×2.44×1.10 in)
- Weight: 192 g (7 oz) with Battery and SD Memory Card

Panasonic Lumix DMC-LF1 is a digital camera by Panasonic Lumix. The highest-resolution pictures it records is 12.1 megapixels, through its 28 mm LEICA DC VARIO-SUMMICRON.

== Property ==
- adjustable EVF
- High sensitivity MOS sensor
- 15 in-camera creative controls
- bright F2.0-5.9
- 7x zoom
- wirelessly links to smartphones
