= Panasonic Lumix DMC-LZ30 =

Overview
- Maker: Panasonic Lumix
- Type: SLR
- F-numbers: 3.0 - 5.9

Sensor/medium
- Sensor type: CCD
- Sensor size: 16.1 megapixels
- Recording medium: SD, SDHC or SDXC memory card

Focusing
- Focus modes: Autofocus, Spot, Face Detection, AF Tracking, Multi, Centre, Zoom macro

Flash
- Flash: built-in

Shutter
- Shutter speeds: 15 - 1/2000

General
- LCD screen: 3.0" TFT Screen LCD
- Battery: AA battery x 4
- Dimensions: 123.8×83.7×91.4 mm (4.87×3.30×3.60 in)
- Weight: 465 g (16 oz)

Panasonic Lumix DMC-LZ30 is a digital camera by Panasonic Lumix. The highest-resolution pictures it records is 16.1 megapixels, through its 25mm Wide-Angle Lens.

== Property ==
- 35x optical long zoom
- 25-875mm
- HD Video capture
- creative effects
- DSLR like exposure control features
