= Panasonic Lumix DMC-SZ3 =

Panasonic Lumix DMC-SZ3(EU: DMC-TZ7)
Overview
- Maker: Panasonic Lumix
- Type: Compact

Lens
- Lens mount: LEICA DC VARIO-ELMAR
- F-numbers: 3.1 - 5.9

Sensor/medium
- Sensor type: CCD
- Sensor size: 16.6 megapixels
- Storage media: SD, SDHC, SDXC

Focusing
- Focus modes: Normal
- Focus areas: Normal / Intelligent AUTO / movies: 5 cm - infinity / 150 cm - infinity

Flash
- Flash: built-in

Shutter
- Frame rate: 1.4 - 10
- Shutter speeds: 8 - 1/1600

General
- LCD screen: 2.7" TFT Screen LCD
- Battery: Li-ion Battery Pack (3.6V / 690mAh / 2.5Wh)
- Dimensions: 94,8 x 55,8 x 21,9 mm
- Weight: 111 g (4 oz) without Battery and SD Memory Card

Panasonic Lumix DMC-SZ3 is a digital camera by Panasonic Lumix. The highest-resolution pictures it records is 16.6 megapixels, through its 25mm Wide-Angle Leica DC VARIO-ELMAR.

== Property ==
- 10X optical zoom
- Capture HD video
- 12 in-camera creative effects
