= Panasonic Lumix DMC-FX77 =

Overview
- Maker: Panasonic Lumix
- Type: SLR

Lens
- Lens: LEICA DC VARIO-SUMMARIT
- F-numbers: 2.5 - 5.9

Sensor/medium
- Sensor type: CCD
- Sensor size: 12.1 megapixels
- Recording medium: SD, SDHC or SDXC memory card

Flash
- Flash: built-in

Shutter
- Frame rate: 3.7 - 10
- Shutter speeds: 8 - 1/4000

General
- LCD screen: 3.5" TFT Full Touch Screen LCD
- Battery: Li-ion Battery Pack (3.6V, Minimum: 680 mAh)
- Dimensions: 3,93 x 2,17 x 0,81 in
- Weight: 142 g (5 oz) with Battery and SD Memory Card

Panasonic Lumix DMC-FX77 is a digital camera by Panasonic Lumix. The highest-resolution pictures it records is 14.1 megapixels, through its 24mm Ultra Wide-Angle Leica DC VARIO-SUMMICRON.

== Property ==
- 2.5 LEICA DC VARIO-SUMMARIT Lens with 24mm Ultra Wide-Angle and 5x Optical Zoom
- Full HD Movie: 1.920 x 1.080
- LCD Touch-control 3,5"
- CCD HS 12.1 megapixels and Intelligent Zoom 6.5x
