= Panasonic Lumix DMC-XS1 =

Overview
- Maker: Panasonic Lumix
- Type: Compact
- F-numbers: 2.8 - 6.9

Sensor/medium
- Sensor type: CCD
- Sensor size: 16.1 megapixels
- Storage media: Micro SD, Micro SDHC

Focusing
- Focus modes: Autofocus / Spot / Face Detection / Multi / Centre

Flash
- Flash: built-in

Shutter
- Shutter speeds: 1/1600

General
- LCD screen: 2.7 inch LCD screen
- Battery: Li-ion Battery Pack
- Dimensions: 93.8×53.5×17.6 mm (3.69×2.11×0.69 in)
- Weight: 88 g (3 oz)

Panasonic Lumix DMC-XS1 is a digital camera by Panasonic Lumix. The highest-resolution pictures it records is 16.1 megapixels, through its 24mm lens.

== Property ==
- 5X wide angle optically stabilized zoom
- 13 in-camera creative effects
- 3HD video capture
