= Panasonic Lumix DMC-SZ1 =

Overview
- Maker: Panasonic Lumix
- Type: Compact

Lens
- Lens mount: LEICA DC VARIO-ELMAR
- F-numbers: 3.1 - 5.9

Sensor/medium
- Sensor type: CCD
- Sensor size: 16.6 megapixels
- Storage media: SD, SDHC, SDXC

Focusing
- Focus modes: Normal, AF Macro, Zoom Macro / Quick AF (Always On), Continuous AF(only for motion picture) / AF Tracking
- Focus areas: Normal: Wide 50 cm - infinity / Tele 150 cm - infinity / Macro / Intelligent AUTO/ motion picture: Wide 5 cm - infinity / Tele 150cm - infinity

Flash
- Flash: built-in

Shutter
- Frame rate: 1.3 - 10
- Shutter speeds: 8 - 1/1600

General
- LCD screen: 3.0" TFT Screen LCD
- Battery: Li-ion Battery Pack (3.6V, 680mAh)
- Dimensions: 99.0×59.4×21.0 mm (3.90×2.34×0.83 in)
- Weight: 131 g (5 oz) with Battery and SD Memory Card

Panasonic Lumix DMC-SZ1 is a digital camera by Panasonic Lumix. The highest-resolution pictures it records is 16.6 megapixels, through its 25mm Wide-Angle Leica DC VARIO-ELMAR.

== Property ==
- 25mm Ultra Wide Angle LEICA DC Lens
- 10x Powerful Optical Zoom
- HD Video Recording in MP4 Format
- Mega Optical Image Stabilizer
