= Panasonic Lumix DMC-SZ9 =

Overview
- Maker: Panasonic Lumix
- Type: Compact

Lens
- Lens mount: LEICA DC VARIO-ELMAR
- F-numbers: 3.1–5.9

Sensor/medium
- Sensor type: MOS
- Sensor size: 16.1 megapixels
- Storage media: SD, SDHC, SDXC

Focusing
- Focus modes: Normal, AF Macro, Macro Zoom
- Focus areas: Normal: 50 cm to infinity / 150 cm to infinity

Flash
- Flash: built-in

Shutter
- Frame rate: 2–5
- Shutter speeds: 4–1/1.600

General
- LCD screen: 3.0" TFT Screen LCD
- Battery: Li-ion Battery Pack (3.6V / 690mAh / 2.5Wh)
- Dimensions: 96.5 mm × 56.8 mm × 21.2 mm (3.80 in × 2.24 in × 0.83 in)
- Weight: 119 g (4 oz) without Battery and SD Memory Card

Panasonic Lumix DMC-SZ9 is a digital camera by Panasonic Lumix. The highest-resolution pictures it records is 16.6 megapixels, through its 25mm Ultra Wide Angle Leica DC VARIO-ELMAR.

== Properties ==
- 10x optical zoom
- Venus Engine
- Creative Panorama mode
- Full HD movies
- Beauty Retouch with One-touch Make Up mode
