= Panasonic Lumix DMC-SZ7 =

Overview
- Maker: Panasonic Lumix
- Type: Compact

Lens
- Lens mount: LEICA DC VARIO-ELMAR
- F-numbers: 3.1 - 5.9

Sensor/medium
- Sensor type: MOS
- Sensor size: 14.6 megapixels
- Sensor maker: MPO (3D)
- Storage media: SD, SDHC, SDXC

Focusing
- Focus modes: Normal, AF Macro, Zoom Macro / Quick AFON/OFF, Continuous AF(only for motion picture) / AF Tracking
- Focus areas: Normal: Wide 50 cm - infinity / Tele 150 cm - infinity / Macro / Intelligent AUTO/ motion picture: Wide 5 cm - infinity / Tele 150cm - infinity

Flash
- Flash: built-in

Shutter
- Frame rate: 2 - 10
- Shutter speeds: 8 - 1/1600

General
- LCD screen: 3.0" TFT Screen LCD
- Battery: Li-ion Battery Pack (3.6V, 680mAh)
- Dimensions: 99.0×59.4×21.0 mm (3.90×2.34×0.83 in)
- Weight: 133 g (5 oz) with Battery and SD Memory Card

Panasonic Lumix DMC-SZ7 is a digital camera by Panasonic Lumix. The highest-resolution pictures it records is 16.6 megapixels, through its 25mm Ultra Wide Angle Leica DC VARIO-ELMAR.

== Property ==
- 10x optical zoom
- capture HD video
- 12 in-camera creative effects
