= LZ2 =

LZ2 may refer to the following:

- Zeppelin LZ2, an early model of a type of rigid airship
- LZ2 (algorithm), a lossless data compression algorithm
- Led Zeppelin II, the second album by the band Led Zeppelin
- LZ2 (Lanzarote), a road in the Canary Islands
- Landing Zone 2, SpaceX former landing pad on the Space Coast, Florida, USA
- Panasonic Lumix DMC-LZ2, a digital camera
