= Panasonic Lumix DMC-FX37 =

Overview
- Maker: Panasonic Lumix
- Type: SLR

Lens
- Lens mount: LEICA DC VARIO-ELMARIT
- F-numbers: 4.4-22

Sensor/medium
- Sensor type: CCD
- Sensor size: 10.1 megapixels
- Storage media: SD, SDHC, MultiMediaCard

Focusing
- Focus modes: Normal / Macro, Quick AF On/Off, AF Tracking
- Focus areas: Normal: Wide 50 cm/ Tele 100 cm - infinity Intelligent AUTO / Macro / Clipboard: Wide 5 cm / Tele 100 cm - infinity

Flash
- Flash: built-in

Shutter
- Frame rate: 2.5
- Shutter speeds: 8 - 1/2,000

General
- LCD screen: 2.5" TFT LCD
- Battery: Lithium-ion Battery Pack (3.6 V, 1000 mAh)
- Dimensions: 2.04" x 3.73" x .87"
- Weight: 0.28 lbs

Panasonic Lumix DMC-FX37 is a digital camera by Panasonic, released late in 2008. The highest-resolution pictures it records is 10.1 megapixels, through its 25 mm ultra wide-angle Leica DC lens. It is Panasonic's first compact digital camera to support 720p video at 30 fps.

== Property ==
- 10.1-Megapixel
- 25mm LEICA DC VARIO-ELMARIT Wide-Angle Lens
- 5x Optical Zoom
- 2.5 Diagonal Intelligent LCD and HD Output
