= Panasonic Lumix DMC-FX90 =

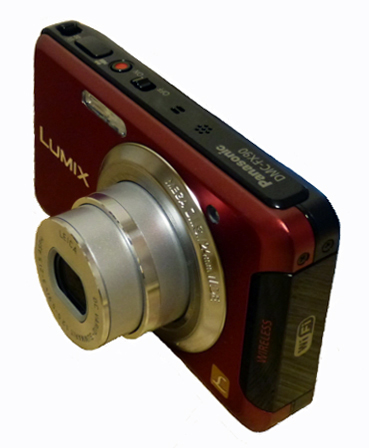

Overview
- Maker: Panasonic Lumix
- Type: Compact

Lens
- Lens: LEICA DC VARIO-SUMMARIT
- F-numbers: 2.5 - 5.9

Sensor/medium
- Sensor type: CCD
- Sensor size: 12.1 megapixels
- Recording medium: SD, SDHC or SDXC memory card

Focusing
- Focus modes: Normal, AF Macro, Zoom Macro, Touch AF/AEQuick AF ON/OFF, Continuous AF, AF Tracking
- Focus areas: Normal: Wide 50 cm - infinity / Tele 100 cm - infinity Macro / Intelligent AUTO/ motion picture: Wide 3 cm - infinity / Tele 100 cm - infinity

Flash
- Flash: built-in

Shutter
- Frame rate: 3.7 - 10
- Shutter speeds: 8 - 1/4000

General
- LCD screen: 3.0" TFT Full Touch Screen LCD
- Battery: Li-ion Battery Pack (3.6V, Minimum: 680mAh)
- Dimensions: 4.02×2.22×0.85 in (102×56×22 mm)
- Weight: 0.29 lb without Battery and SD Memory Card

Panasonic Lumix DMC-FX90 is a digital camera by Panasonic Lumix. The highest-resolution pictures it records is 12.1 megapixels, through its 25 mm Leica DC VARIO-SUMMARIT.

== Property ==
- 12.1 MP CCD
- Wi-Fi® connectivity
- LEICA DC VARIO-SUMMARIT 2.5 Ultra Wide Angle 25 mm Lens with Mega O.I.S.
- 5x zoom
- 1080/60i HD Movie
