= Panasonic Lumix DMC-LZ20 =

Overview
- Maker: Panasonic Lumix
- Type: SLR
- F-numbers: 3.1 - 5.8

Sensor/medium
- Sensor type: CCD
- Sensor size: 16.1 megapixels
- Recording medium: SD, SDHC, or SDXC memory card

Focusing
- Focus modes: Normal, AF Macro, Macro Zoom / Continuous AF (only for motion picture) / AF Tracking
- Focus areas: Normal: Wide 30cm - Infinity / Tele 200 cm - infinity / AF Macro / Intelligent Auto / motion picture Wide 2cm - Infinity /Tele 60cm - infinity

Flash
- Flash: built-in

Shutter
- Frame rate: 1.2
- Shutter speeds: 15 - 1/2000

General
- LCD screen: 3.0" TFT Screen LCD Display
- Battery: AA Battery/Ni-MH Battery x 4
- Dimensions: 119.1×76.5×79.8 mm (4.69×3.01×3.14 in)
- Weight: 499 g (18 oz) with Battery and SD Memory Card

Panasonic Lumix DMC-LZ20 is a digital camera by Panasonic Lumix from the year 2012. The highest-resolution pictures it records is 16.1 megapixels, through its 25mm Wide-Angle Lens.

== Property ==
- 25mm Wide Angle (25mm-525mm)
- 21x Optical Zoom
- 16 Megapixel Sensor
- 3" LCD Display
