= Panasonic Lumix DMC-FX700 =

Overview
- Maker: Panasonic Lumix
- Type: SLR

Lens
- Lens mount: built-in lens
- Lens: LEICA DC VARIO-SUMMICRON 4.3mm - 21.5mm, f/2.2 - f/5.9
- F-numbers: 2.2 - 6.3 (wide), 5.9-6.3 (tele)

Sensor/medium
- Sensor type: MOS
- Sensor size: 14.1 megapixels, 1/2,3" (6.2 x 4.6 mm)
- Recording medium: SD, SDHC or SDXC memory card

Focusing
- Focus: autofocus
- Focus modes: Normal / Macro, Zoom Macro, Quick AF On/Off, Continuous AF On/Off, AF Tracking, Touch AF/AE
- Focus areas: Normal: Wide 50 cm - infinity / Tele 100 cm - infinity, Macro: 3 cm - infinity

Flash
- Flash: built-in

Shutter
- Frame rate: 10 - 60
- Shutter speeds: 8s - 1/2000s

General
- LCD screen: 3.0" TFT Touch Screen LCD
- Battery: Li-ion Battery Pack (3.6V, 940mAh)
- Dimensions: 4.08×2.20×0.97 in (104×56×25 mm)
- Weight: 0.39 lbs with Battery and SD Memory Card

Panasonic Lumix DMC-FX700 is a digital camera by Panasonic Lumix. The highest-resolution pictures it records is 14.1 megapixels, through its 24mm Ultra Wide-Angle Leica DC VARIO-SUMMICRON.

== Property ==
- 2.2 LEICA DC VARIO-SUMMICRON Lens with 24mm Ultra Wide-Angle and 5x Optical Zoom
- Full HD Movie Recording: 1920x 1080
- Venus Engine FHD with Even Higher Signal Processing Performance
