= Panasonic Lumix DMC-TZ3 =

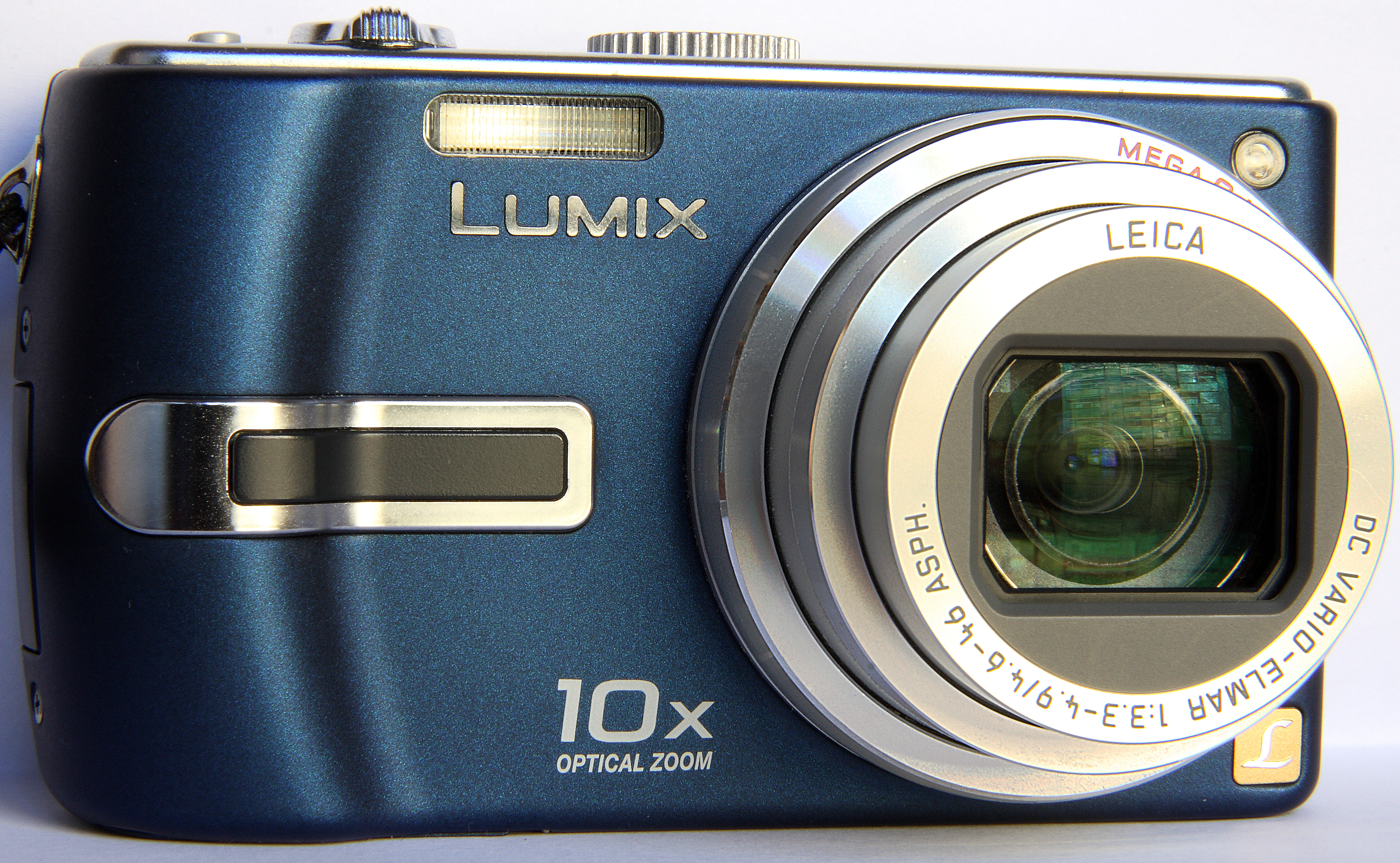

Overview
- Maker: Panasonic Holdings Corporation
- Type: Point-and-shoot

Lens
- Lens: Fixed

Sensor/medium
- Sensor: 1/2.35" CCD res = 3072 × 2304 (7.2 million effective)
- Film speed: Auto, 100, 200, 400, 800, 1250, High sensitivity 3200
- Storage media: Secure Digital Card (SD) and Secure Digital High-Capacity (SDHC)

Focusing
- Focus areas: 9-points, 3-points, 1-point, spot

Shutter
- Shutter speed range: 1/60s –1/2000s
- Continuous shooting: 3 frames/s, 5 consecutive frames

Viewfinder
- Viewfinder: Liquid crystal display

General
- LCD screen: 3.0 in (7.62 cm), 230,000 pixels
- Battery: 3.7 V, 1000 mAh
- Weight: 232 g (8 oz)

The Panasonic Lumix DMC-TZ3 was a compact 'Travel Zoom' camera announced on January 31, 2007. It was the successor to the 2006 TZ1 announced in 2006, and was released in parallel with the TZ2. It has a 10× optical zoom with the focal range equivalent to 28–280 mm (35 mm film equivalent) coupled with Mega O.I.S. image stabiliser. It is a fully automatic compact camera, without manual control of aperture and shutter time. The TZ3 was awarded both the TIPA "Best Superzoom Digital Camera" award and the EISA "European Compact Camera" award in 2007. The TZ4, TZ5 (known as TZ15 in Asia, Australia and New Zealand), and TZ50 succeeded the TZ2 and TZ3.
