= Panasonic Lumix DMC-FX150 =

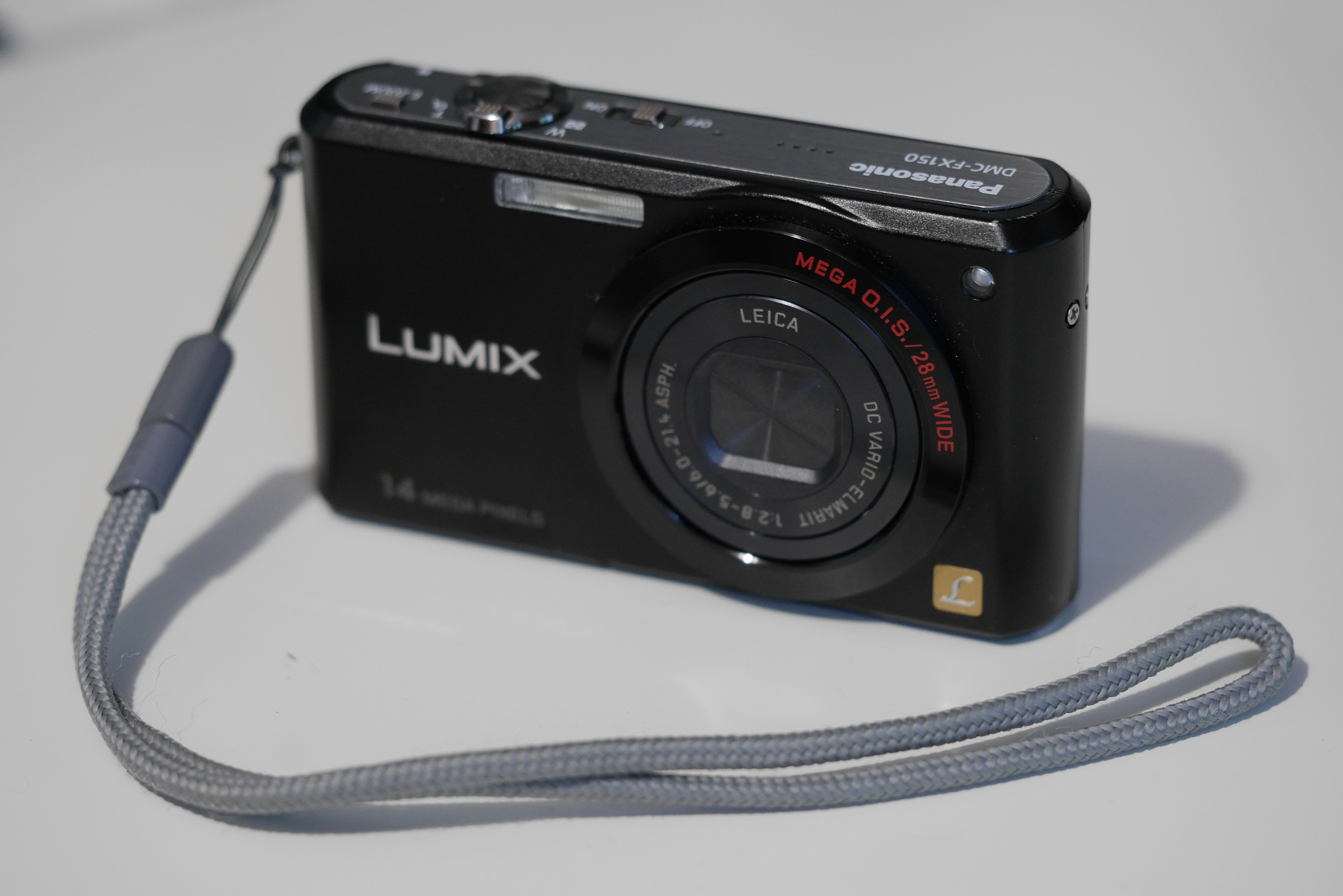
- A black finish Panasonic FX150, shown from the front with the manufacturer's standard strap attached to the lug

Overview
- Maker: Panasonic Lumix
- Type: Compact

Lens
- Lens mount: LEICA DC VARIO-ELMARIT
- F-numbers: 2.8-9.0 (wide end) 5.6-18.0 (telephoto end)

Sensor/medium
- Sensor type: 1/1.72" CCD
- Sensor size: 14.7 megapixels
- Storage media: SD, SDHC

Focusing
- Focus modes: Normal / Macro, Quick AF On/Off, AF Area Select, AF Tracking
- Focus areas: Normal: 50cm - infinity Intelligent AUTO / Macro: Wide 5cm / Tele 30cm - infinity

Flash
- Flash: built-in

Shutter
- Frame rate: 2.5
- Shutter: Mechanical
- Shutter speeds: P:1-1/2000 M:60-1/2000

General
- LCD screen: 2.7" TFT LCD
- Battery: Li-ion Battery Pack (3.7V, 1150mAh) model CGA-S005E
- Dimensions: 2.12" x 3.8" x .98"
- Weight: 0.33 lb

Panasonic Lumix DMC-FX150 (in USA and Europe, marketed as the FX180 in Asia and Australia) is a digital camera by Panasonic Lumix. The highest-resolution pictures it records is 14.7 megapixels, through its 28-100mm (35mm equivalent) Leica DC VARIO-ELMARIT lens.

Announced as the successor to the FX100 on the 21st of July 2008, and advertised as the joint highest resolving compact camera on the market (with the Samsung NV100HD - also branded as the Samsung TL34HD) with which it appears to share both its sensor and lens, having identical pixel counts, focal lengths and aperture values.

On the related Samsung models the lens is branded Schneider-Kreuznach rather than Panasonic Leica. The Samsung has a greater reliance on its touch screen for control whereas the Panasonic relies on a typical compact camera layout with 4-way directional buttons acting as shortcuts and a switch between playback and shooting mode. A Q.Menu button at the bottom right of the rear face gives quick access to most routinely used settings such as focus mode, ISO, metering mode and so on. The E.Zoom button on the top-front-right of the camera (when viewed from the back) gives one-touch access to the wide and telephoto ends of the zoom, while a standard zoom rocker around the shutter allows access to the points of zoom in between.

The FX150 was priced at £299 in the UK ($399 in the US) and is notable for being one of the few ultra compact cameras of that age, CCD sensor and high resolution to support raw image output which it does into Panasonic's normal RW2 format. Although the camera supported both P (program automatic) and M (full manual) control modes, the aperture is not variable in the sense of being adjustable through a range of values, instead it relies on a plate that slides in and out of position as required, as can be seen below.

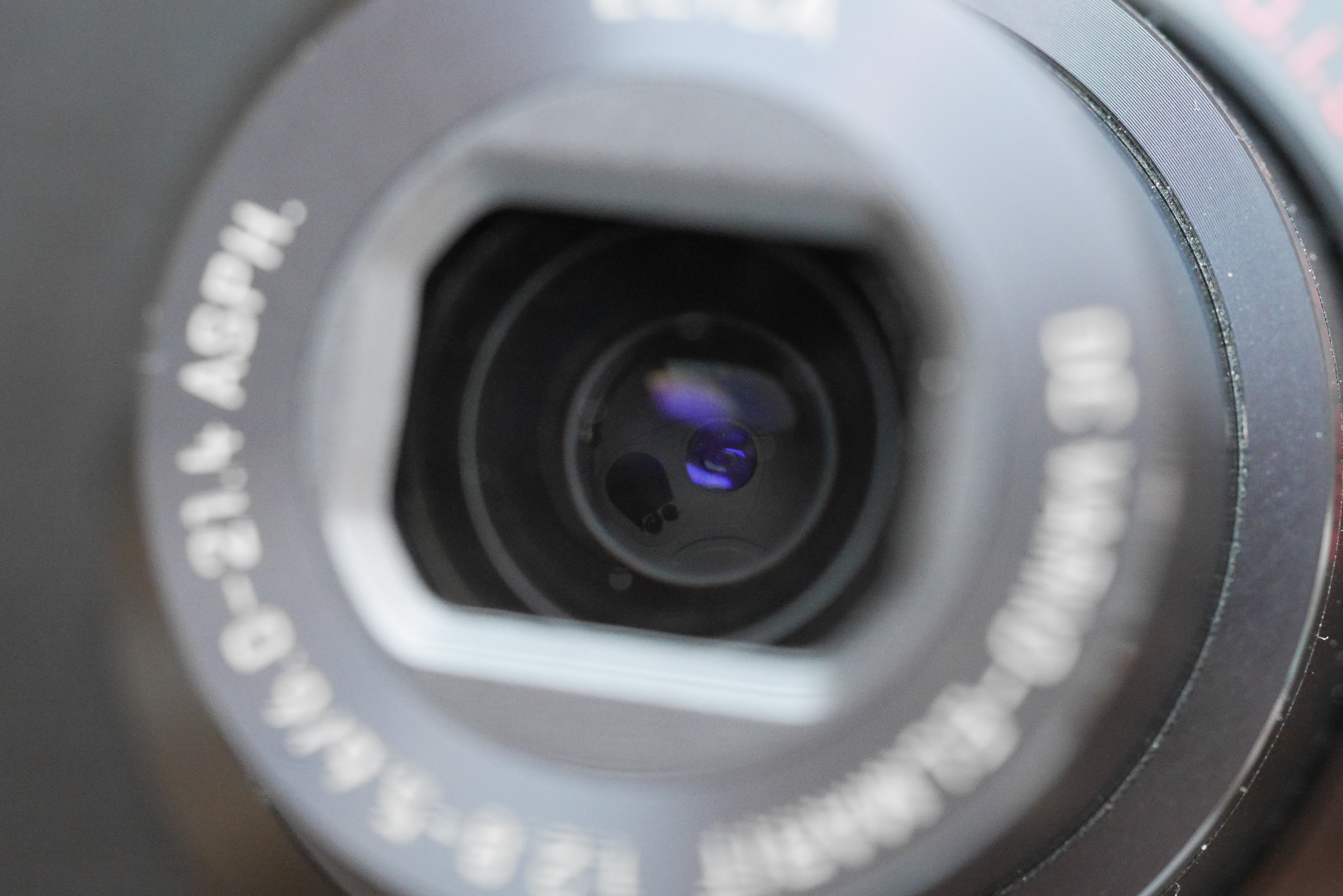
Panasonic FX150 lens with aperture set at f2.8

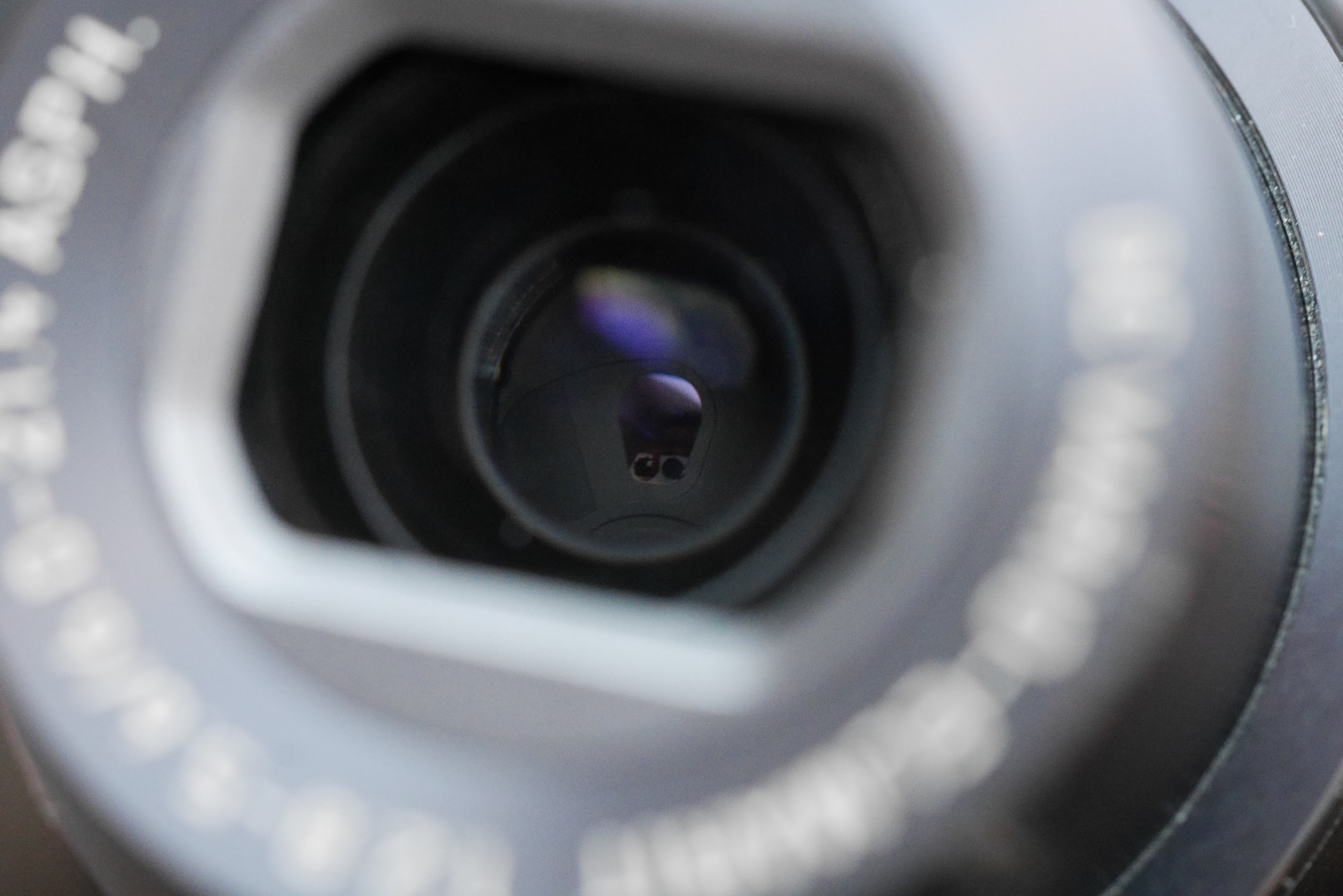
Panasonic FX150 lens at 28mm with aperture set at f9

== Specifications ==
- Intelligent Auto, Program (P), Manual (M), Video and 22 Scene modes
- RAW image output in P and M modes
- LEICA DC Vario-Elmarit Lens 6.0-21.4mm f2.8-5.6 zoom lens (28-100mm 35mm equivalent focal length)
- Scene modes includes a High Sensitivity mode that boosts ISO maximum to 6400, but at a maximum resolution of 3 megapixels

== Critical reception ==
Critically it fared poorly against other brands' offerings at the time and even against Panasonic's other offerings, with DxOMark scoring it at 28 points, compared to the LX5 (41 points), Canon PowerShot S95 (47 points) or Nikon P7700 (53 points). While most reviewers at the time were positive about the size and feel of the build, scepticism around the high resolution leading to higher noise seems to have been mostly unfounded as reviewers concluded the image quality was generally decent as long as ISOs could be kept to 400 or below, though CNET writer James De Vile was unimpressed enough to list noise as a con twice over.

However, it has since found some appreciation with photographers seeking a specific look but also wanting the most resolution without resorting to upscaling lower resolution cameras, as noted by DPReview in their interview with Sofi Lee.
