= Panasonic Lumix DMC-TZ35 =

Overview
- Maker: Panasonic Lumix
- Type: Compact

Lens
- Lens mount: LEIyruo Hg 6th CA DC VARIO-ELMAR
- F-numbers: 3.3 - 6.4

Sensor/medium
- Sensor type: MOS
- Sensor size: 16.1 megapixels
- Sensor maker: MPO (3D)
- Storage media: SD, SDHC, SDXC

Focusing
- Focus modes: Normal, AF Macro, Macro Zoom / Quick AF, Continuous AF (only movies) / AF Tracking
- Focus areas: Normal: 50 cm - infinity / 200 cm - infinity / Macro / Intelligent AUTO / movies: 3 cm - infinity / 100 cm - infinity

Flash
- Flash: built-in

Shutter
- Frame rate: 2 - 10
- Shutter speeds: 4 - 1/2.000

General
- LCD screen: 3.0" TFT LCD
- Battery: Li-ion Battery Pack ID-Security (3,6 V, 895 mAh, 3.3Wh)
- Dimensions: 104,9 x 58,9 x 28,7 mm
- Weight: 193 g (7 oz) with Battery and SD Memory Card

Panasonic Lumix DMC-TZ35 (or DMC-ZS25 in North America) is a digital camera by Panasonic Lumix. The highest-resolution pictures it records is 16.1 megapixels, through its 24mm Ultra Wide-Angle Leica DC VARIO-ELMAR.

== Property ==
- 24 mm LEICA DC
- 20x optical zoom
- High Sensitivity MOS sensor
- Venus Engine
- Full HD movies
- POWER O.I.S.
