= Panasonic Lumix DMC-TZ10 =

Digital camera model

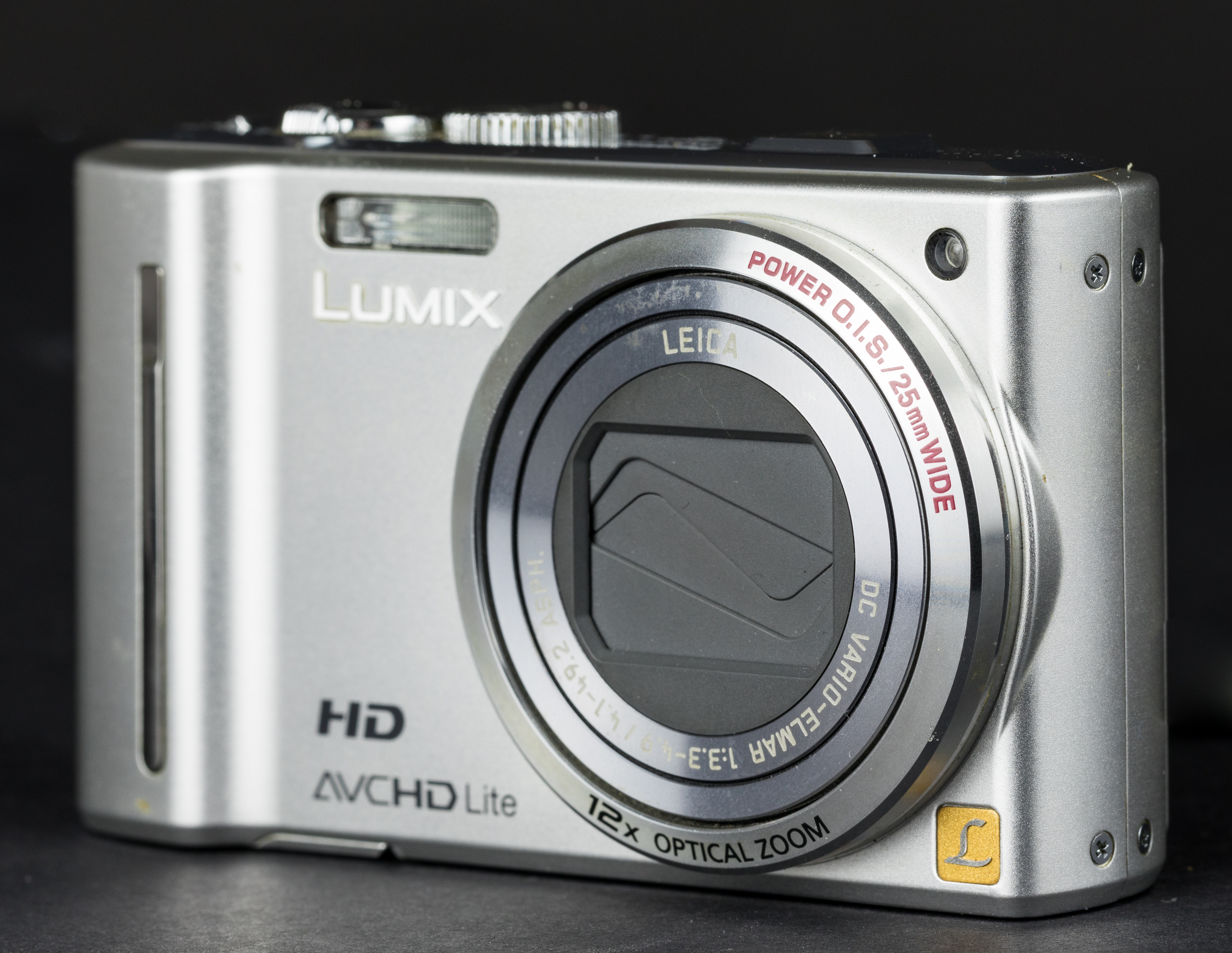

Overview
- Maker: Panasonic Holdings Corporation
- Type: Point-and-shoot

Lens
- Lens: Fixed

Sensor/medium
- Sensor: 1/2.33" CCD
- Maximum resolution: 4000 × 3000 (12.1 million effective)
- Film speed: Auto, 100-6400
- Storage media: Secure Digital Card (SD), Secure Digital High-Capacity (SDHC) or SDXC

Shutter
- Shutter speed range: 60-1/2000 s

Viewfinder
- Viewfinder: Liquid-crystal display

General
- LCD screen: 3.0 in (7.62 cm), 460,000 pixels
- Battery: 3.76, 895
- Weight: 218 g (8 oz)
- Made in: Japan

The Panasonic Lumix DMC-TZ10 (or DMC-ZS7 in North America) is a compact "Travel Zoom" digital camera released in 2010. It is equipped with a 12x zoom lens, a GPS receiver for geotagging, has 12 megapixels, and can film at up to 720p resolution at 30 frames per second in MJPEG and AVCHD formats. The camera can be connected to a USB port for file transfer and weighs 218 grams.

Since initial release, Panasonic have published two firmware upgrades for the TZ10. Version 1.1 was released in June 2010, and improved stability on camera startup, and support for several external flashes. Firmware version 1.2 was released in September 2010, and improves GPS location retrieval time.

== Description ==
- 12.1 megapixel
- Flash
- 12x optical zoom Leica lens
- Objective focus length: 4.1~49.2 mm (35 mm equivalent: 25~300 mm)
- Objective aperture: f/3.3~4.9
- POWER O.I.S. automatic utilisation with processor Venus Engine HD II
- Intelligent Resolution Technology
- Automatic ISO control
- 4x Digital Zoom lossless
- PASM modes
- AVCHD film type with HD resolution 720P (1280x720 / 30 fps) and Sound stereo dolby
- GPS module with 500,000 Point of Interest in the world
- 3" screen 460,000 pixels
- Cards: SD, SDHC and SDXC

== Examples ==
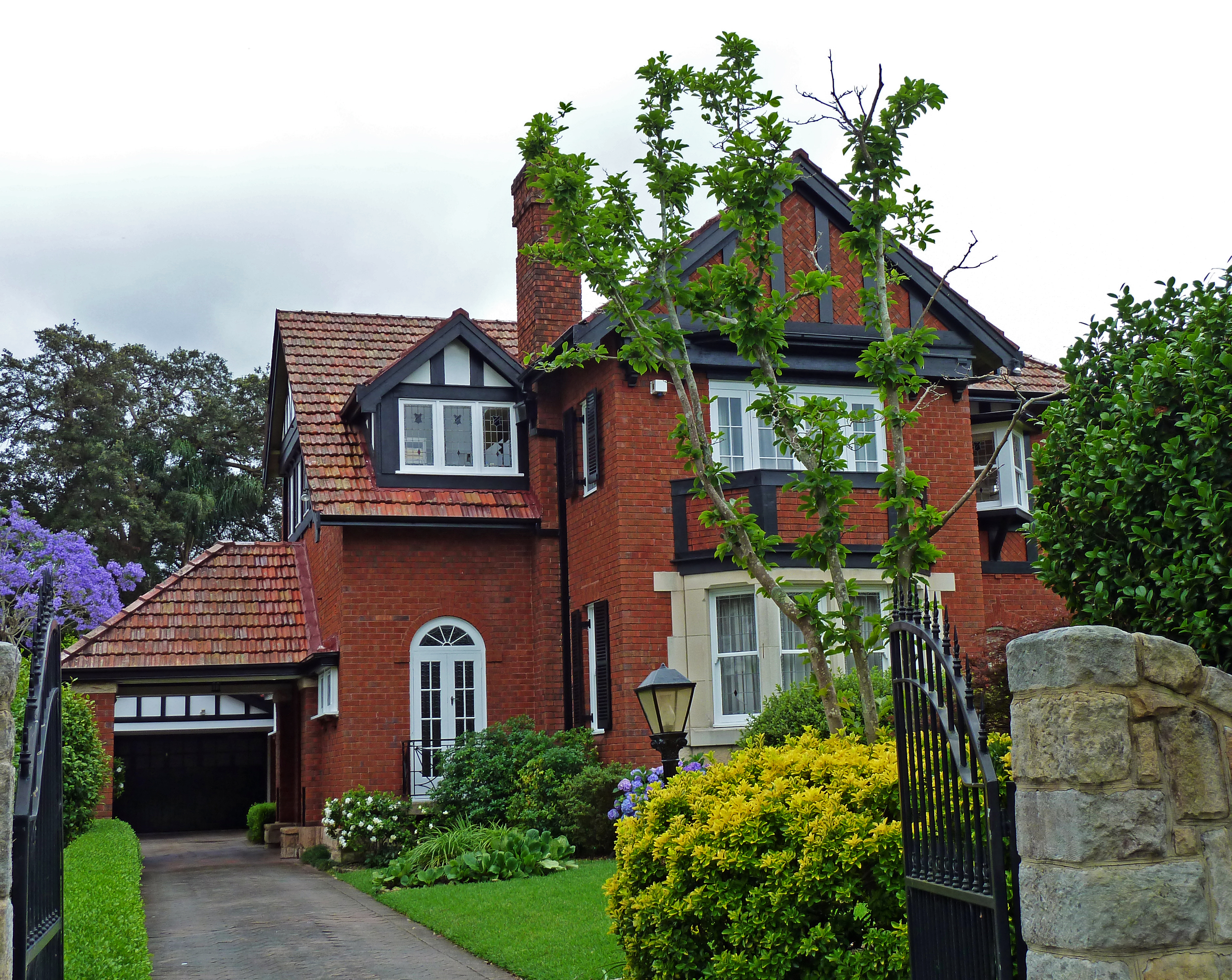
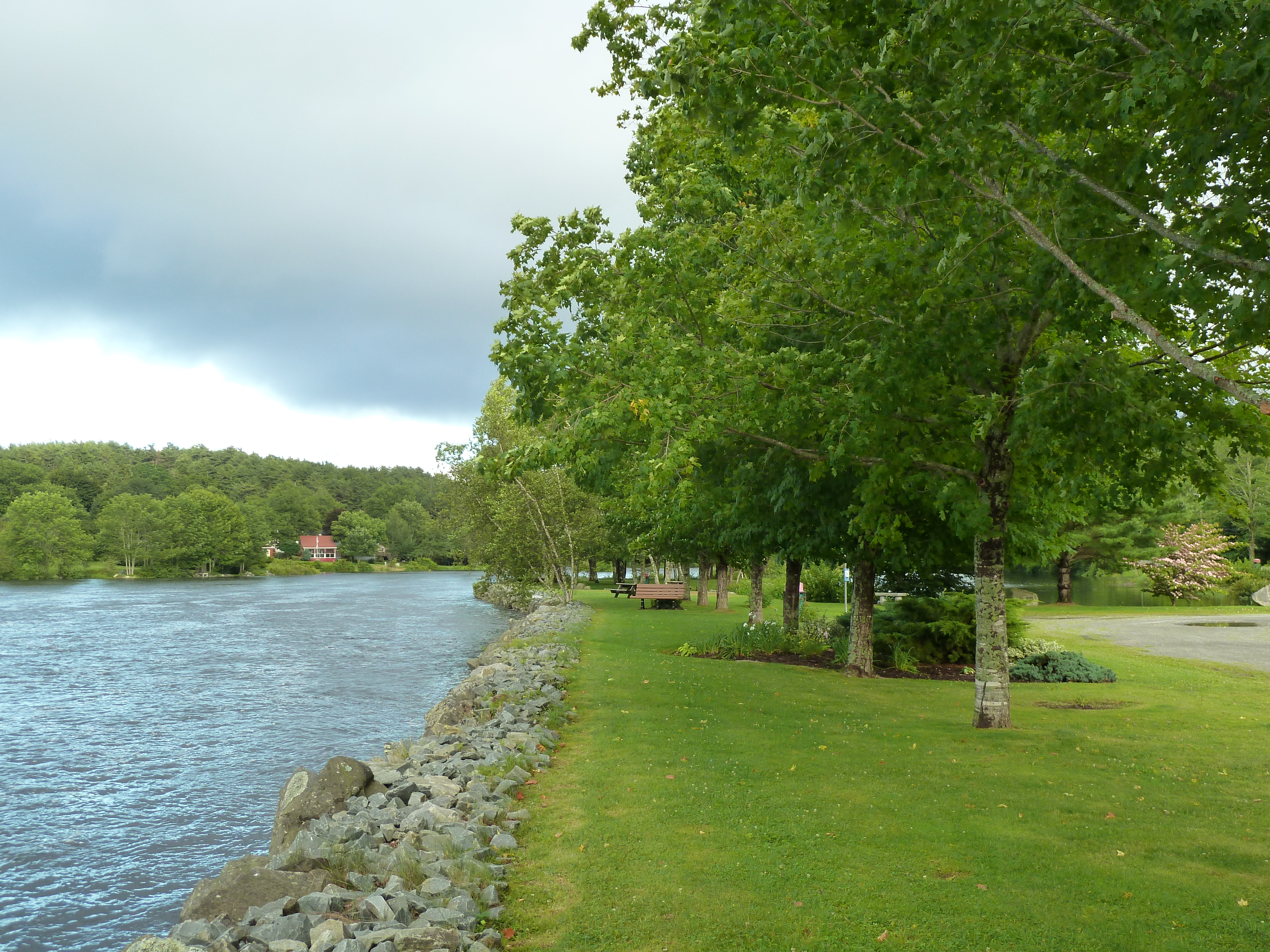
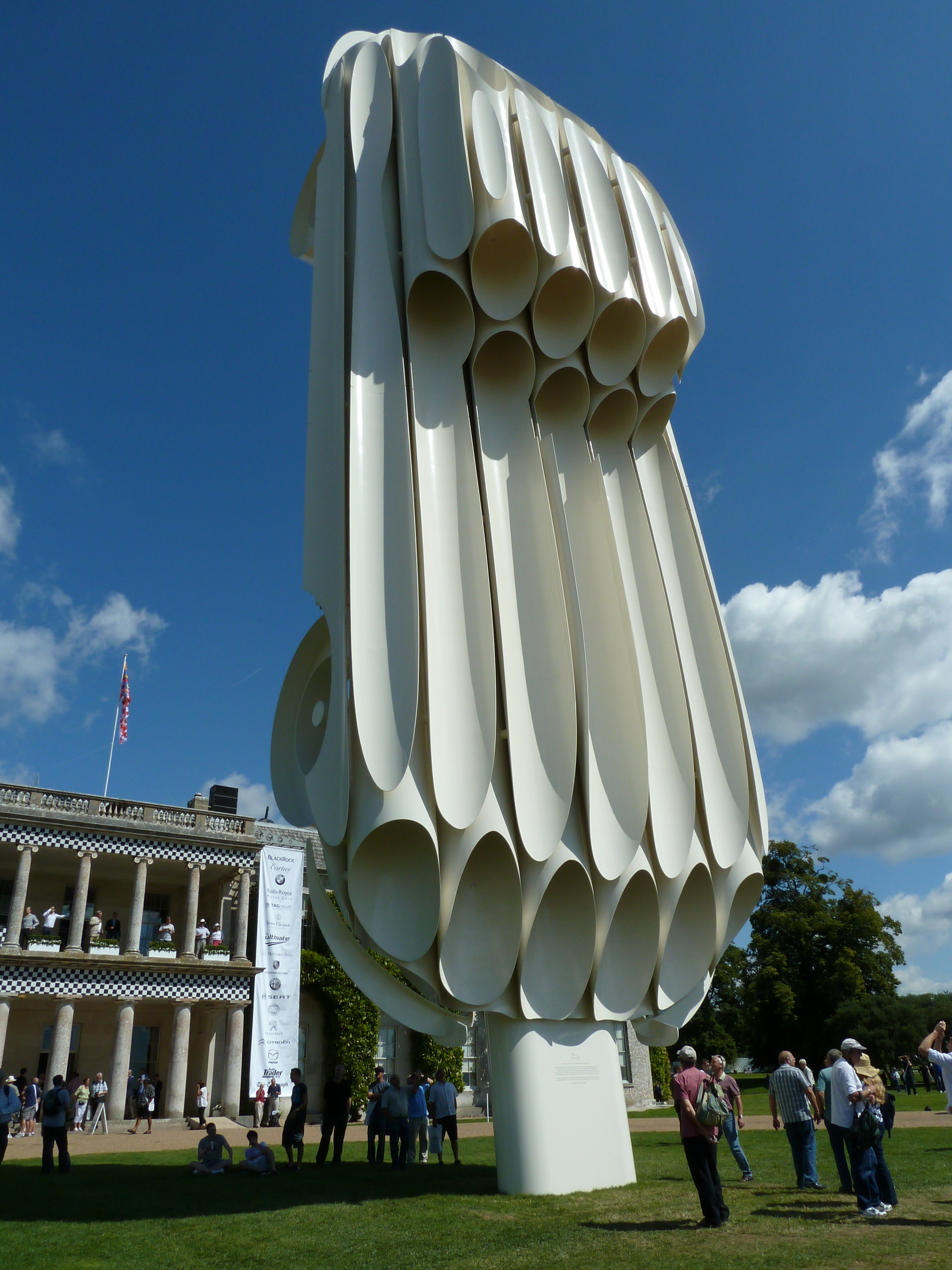
