= Panasonic Lumix DMC-TZ20 =

Overview
- Maker: Panasonic Lumix
- Type: Compact

Lens
- Lens mount: LEICA DC VARIO-ELMAR
- F-numbers: 3.3 - 5.9

Sensor/medium
- Sensor type: MOS
- Sensor size: 14.1 megapixels
- Sensor maker: MPO (3D)
- Storage media: SD, SDHC, SDXC

Focusing
- Focus modes: Normal / AF Macro, Zoom Macro, Quick AF, AF Tracking, Touch AF/AE / AF Continuous (only videos)
- Focus areas: Normal: 50 cm - infinity / 200 cm - infinity / Macro / Intelligent AUTO / movies: 3 cm - infinity / 100 cm - infinity

Flash
- Flash: built-in

Shutter
- Frame rate: 10
- Shutter speeds: 60 - 1/4000

General
- LCD screen: 3.0" TFT Touch Screen LCD
- Battery: Li-ion Battery Pack ID-Security (3,6 V, 895 mAh)
- Dimensions: 104,9 x 57,6 x 33,4 mm
- Weight: 219 g (8 oz) with Battery and SD Memory Card

Panasonic Lumix DMC-TZ20, also known as Panasonic Lumix DMC-TZ22 or Panasonic Lumix DMC-ZS10, is a digital camera by Panasonic Lumix. The highest-resolution pictures it records is 14.1 megapixels, through its 24mm Ultra Wide-Angle Leica DC VARIO-ELMAR.

== Property ==
- 24 mm LEICA DC
- 16x optical zoom
- Full HD movies 1.920 x 1.080 50i
- GPS integrated
- touch-screen LCD
- 3D photos
- iA (Intelligent Auto) mode with night shot free-hand
