= Panasonic Lumix DMC-TZ25 =

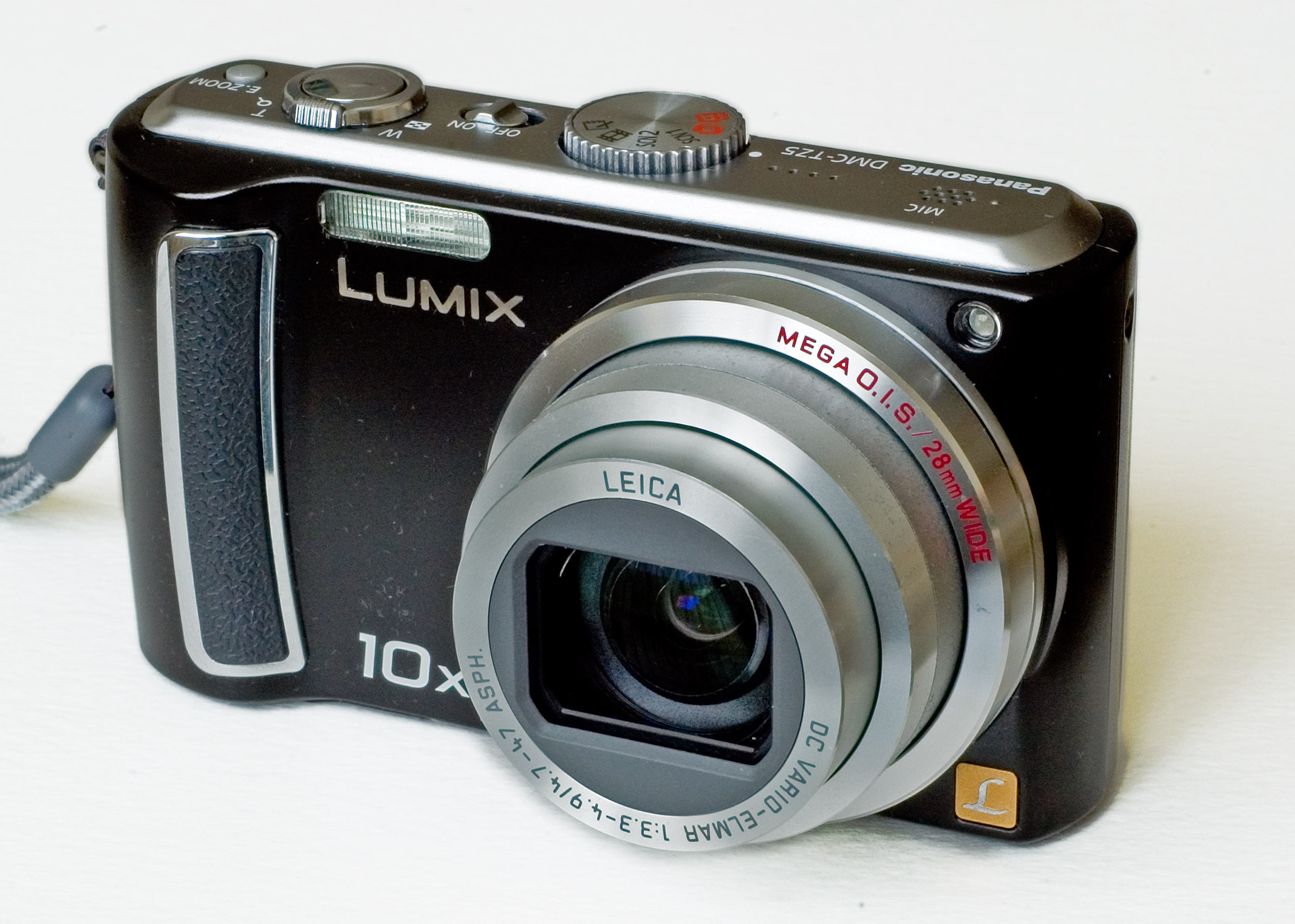

Overview
- Maker: Panasonic Lumix
- Type: Compact

Lens
- Lens mount: LEICA DC VARIO-ELMAR
- F-numbers: 3.3 - 5.9

Sensor/medium
- Sensor type: MOS
- Sensor size: 12.1 megapixels
- Sensor maker: MPO (3D)
- Storage media: SD, SDHC, SDXC

Focusing
- Focus modes: Normale, AF Macro, Zoom Macro / Quick AF On / Off, AF continuous (only videos) / AF Tracking
- Focus areas: Normal: 50 cm - infinity / 200 cm - infinity / Macro / Intelligent AUTO / movies: 3 cm - infinity / 100 cm - infinity

Flash
- Flash: built-in

Shutter
- Frame rate: 2 - 60
- Shutter speeds: 15 - 1/4.000

General
- LCD screen: 3.0" TFT LCD
- Battery: Li-ion Battery Pack ID-Security (3,6 V, 895 mAh)
- Dimensions: 104,9 x 57,6 x 33,4 mm
- Weight: 208 g (7 oz) with Battery and SD Memory Card

Panasonic Lumix DMC-TZ25 (or DMC-ZS15 in North America) is a digital camera by Panasonic Lumix. The highest-resolution pictures it records is 12.1 megapixels, through its 24mm Ultra Wide-Angle Leica DC VARIO-ELMAR.

== Property ==
- 24 mm LEICA DC
- 16x optical zoom
- High Sensitivity MOS sensor
- Full HD movies
- POWER O.I.S. with Active mode
- Creative Control, Panorama Shot e 3D Photo modes
