= Panasonic Lumix DMC-TZ30 =

Digital camera manufactured by Panasonic

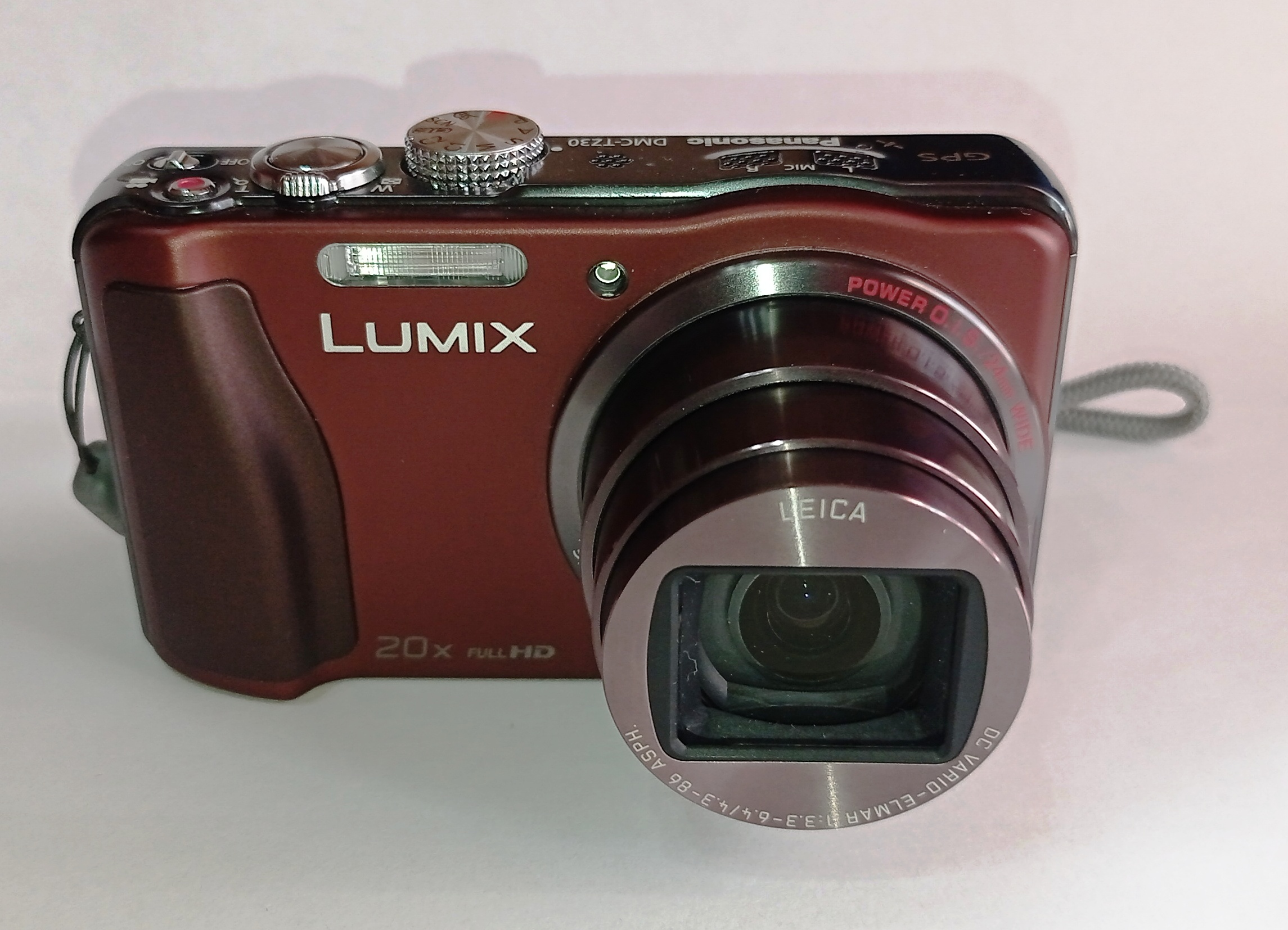

Overview
- Maker: Panasonic Lumix
- Type: Compact

Lens
- Lens mount: LEICA DC VARIO-ELMAR
- F-numbers: 3.3 – 6.4 (and up to 8.0 in Manual mode)

Sensor/medium
- Sensor type: MOS
- Sensor size: 14.1 megapixels
- Sensor maker: MPO (3D)
- Storage media: SD, SDHC, SDXC

Focusing
- Focus modes: Normal, AF Macro, Zoom Macro / Quick AF On / Off, AF continuous (only videos) / AF Tracking
- Focus areas: Normal: 50 cm – infinity / 200 cm – infinity / Macro / Intelligent AUTO / movies: 3 cm – infinity / 100 cm – infinity

Flash
- Flash: built-in

Shutter
- Frame rate: 2–60
- Shutter speeds: 15 – 1/2.000

General
- LCD screen: 3.0" TFT LCD
- Battery: Li-ion Battery Pack ID-Security (3,6 V, 895 mAh)
- Dimensions: 104,9 x 58,9 x 28,2 mm
- Weight: 206 g (7 oz) with Battery and SD Memory Card

Panasonic Lumix DMC-TZ30 (also known as the DMC-ZS20 in North America) is a digital camera by Panasonic Lumix. The highest-resolution pictures it records is 14.1 megapixels, through its 24mm Ultra Wide-Angle Leica DC VARIO-ELMAR.

== Technical specifications and features ==
- 24 mm LEICA DC
- 20x optical zoom
- High Sensitivity MOS sensor
- Integrated GPS
- POWER Optical Image Stabilization with Active mode
- Full HD Video Recording
