= Panasonic Lumix DMC-FZ100 =

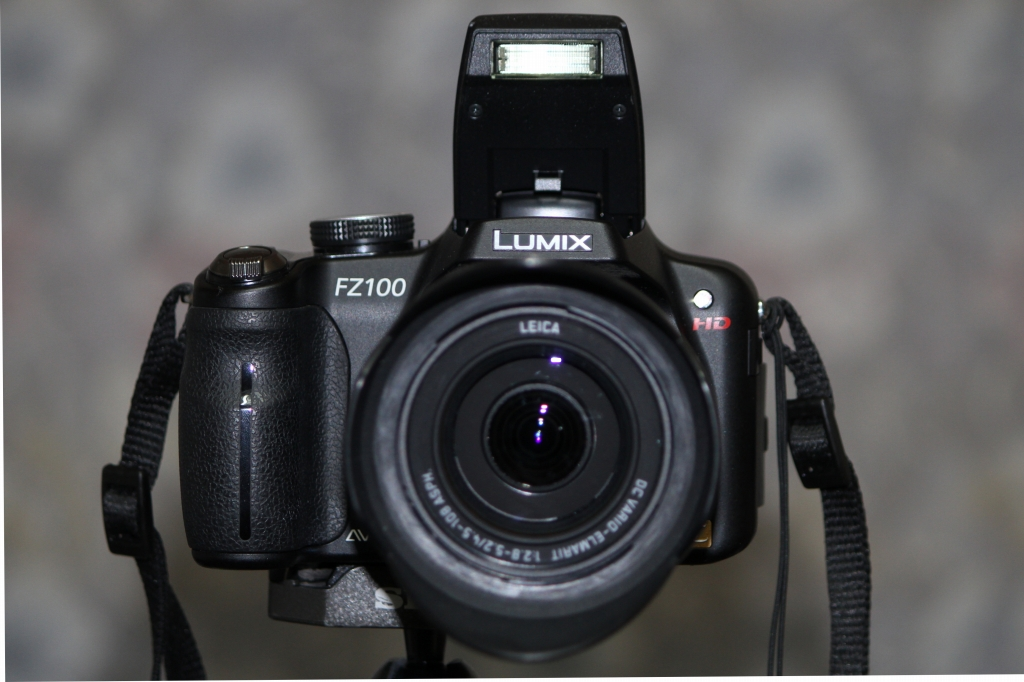

Overview
- Maker: Panasonic Lumix
- Type: Bridge digital camera

Lens
- Lens mount: LEICA DC VARIO-ELMARIT
- F-numbers: 2.8-11

Sensor/medium
- Sensor type: MOS
- Sensor size: 14.1 megapixels
- Maximum resolution: 4,320×3,240
- Storage media: SD, SDHC, SDXC

Focusing
- Focus modes: Normal / Macro, Quick AF On/Off, Continuous AF On/OffAF/MF Switchable, Manual Focus, One Shot AF, AF Area Select, AF Tracking
- Focus areas: Normal: Wide 30 cm - infinity / Tele 200 cm - infinity Macro AF / MF / Intelligent AUTO: Wide 1 cm - infinity / Tele 100 cm - infinity

Exposure/metering
- Exposure metering: Manual

Flash
- Flash: Hot shoe, Built-in pop up

Shutter
- Frame rate: 11 - 60
- Shutter: Manual
- Shutter speeds: 60 - 1/2000

Viewfinder
- Viewfinder: EVF and 3.0-inch colour LCD

Image processing
- White balance: Manual

General
- LCD screen: 3.0" Free-Angle TFT Screen LCD
- Battery: Li-ion Battery Pack (7.2V, Minimum: 895mAh)
- Dimensions: 4.89×3.20×3.74 in (124×81×95 mm)
- Weight: 1.19 lb with Battery and SD Memory Card

Panasonic Lumix DMC-FZ100 is a digital camera by Panasonic Lumix released in July 2010. The highest-resolution pictures it records is 14.1 megapixels, through its 25 mm Leica DC VARIO-ELMARIT.

== Property ==
- Ultra wide-angle with 24× optical zoom
- Full HD movie recording
- Venus Engine FHD
