= Panasonic Lumix DMC-LC43 =

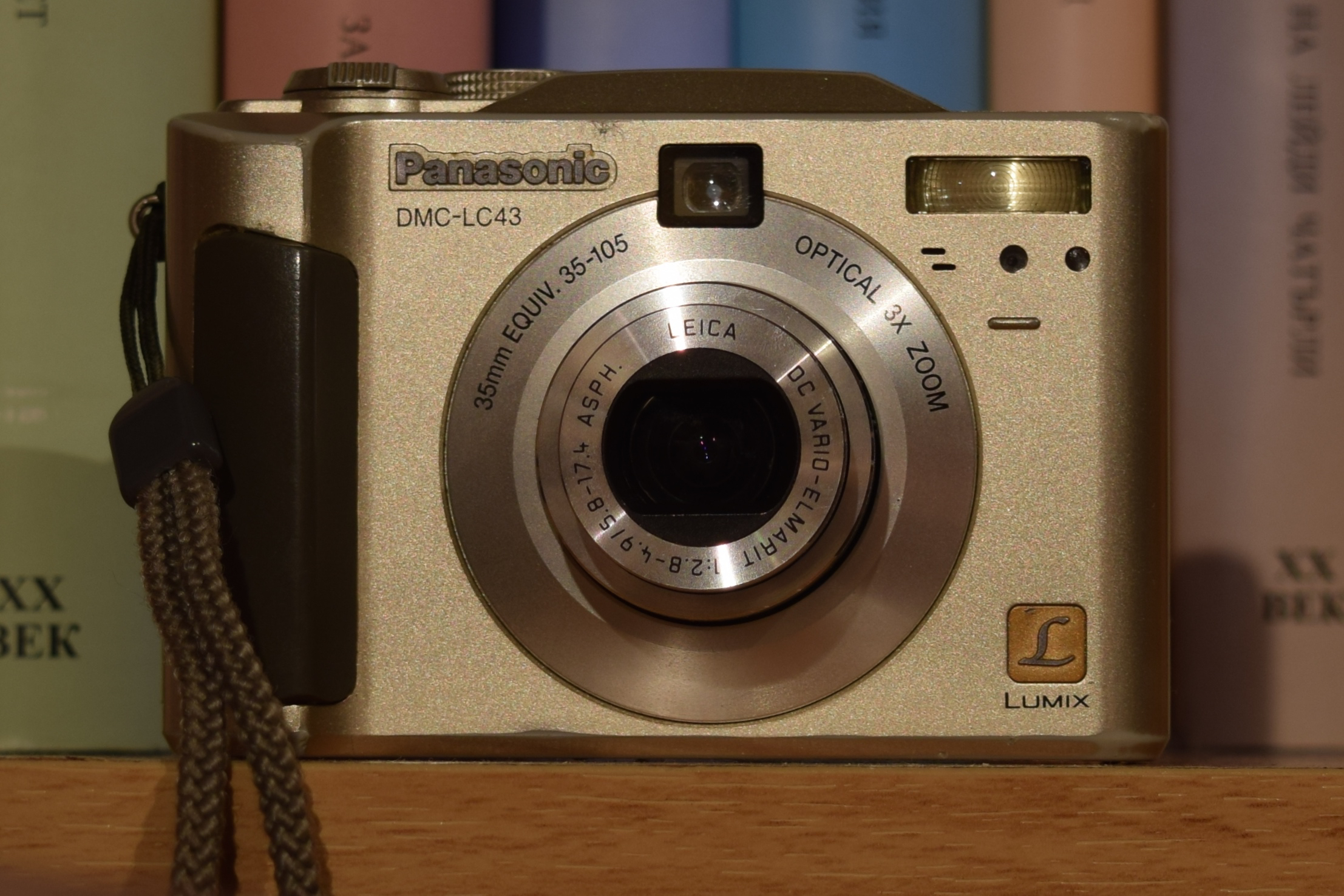

Overview
- Maker: Panasonic Lumix
- Type: SLR

Lens
- Lens: 35-105mm (3x zoom)
- F-numbers: 2.8 - 4.9

Sensor/medium
- Sensor type: CCD
- Sensor size: 4 megapixels
- Maximum resolution: 2304 x 1728
- Storage media: SD, MMC

Focusing
- Focus: automatic

Flash
- Flash: built-in (range: 2.4m)

Shutter
- Shutter speeds: 8 - 1/2000 sec

General
- LCD screen: 1.5" TFT Screen LCD
- Battery: 2 x AA batteries
- Dimensions: 96×66×34 mm (3.8×2.6×1.3 in)
- Weight: 215 g (8 oz) with Batteries and SD Memory Card

Panasonic Lumix DMC-LC43 is a compact digital camera by Panasonic Lumix. The highest-resolution pictures it records are 4 megapixels.
