= Panasonic Lumix DMC-FZ48 =

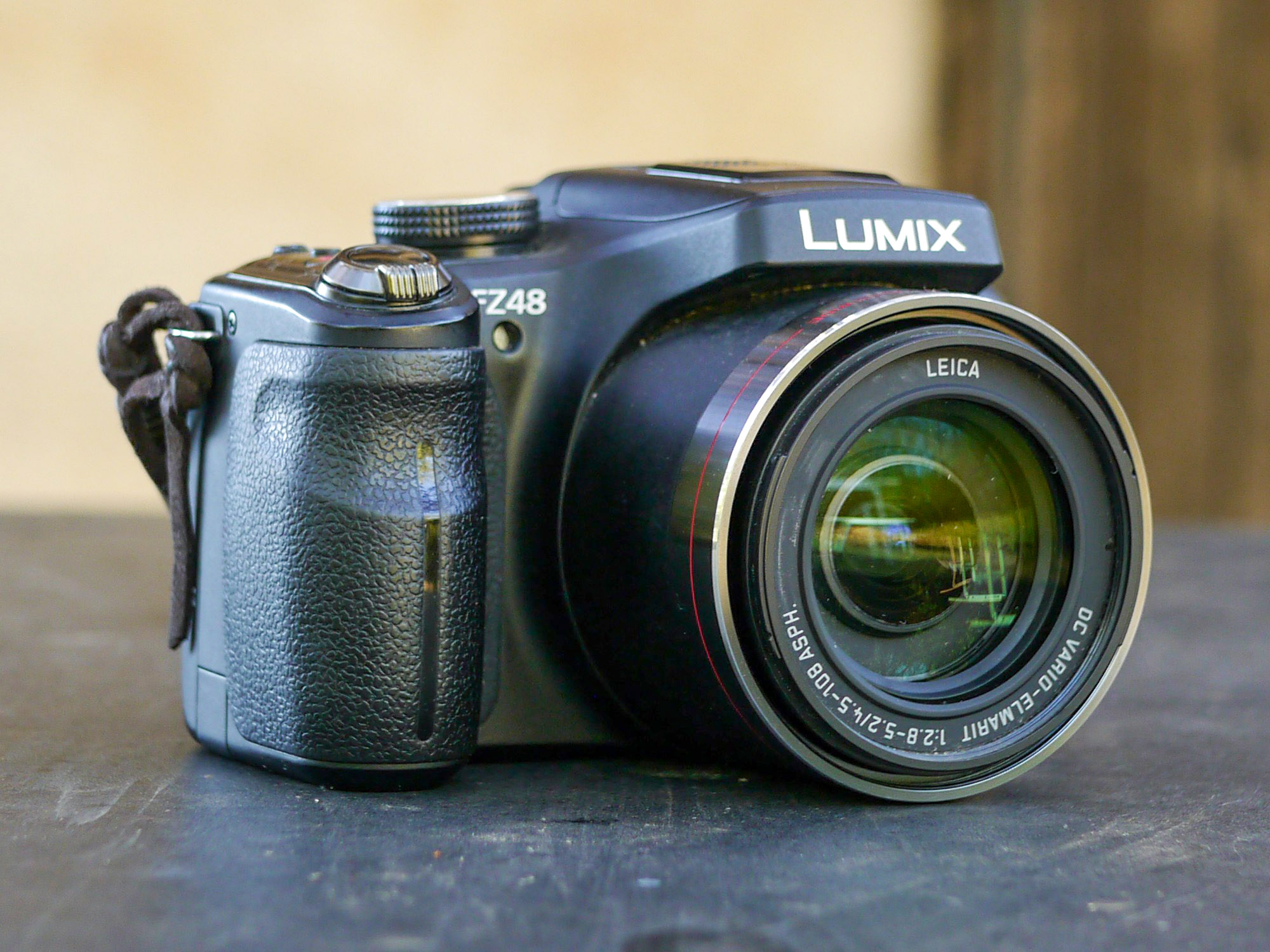

Overview
- Maker: Panasonic Lumix
- Type: SLR

Lens
- Lens mount: LEICA DC VARIO-ELMARIT
- F-numbers: 2,8 - 5,2

Sensor/medium
- Sensor type: CCD
- Sensor size: 12.1 megapixels
- Sensor maker: MPO (3D)
- Storage media: SD, SDHC, SDXC

Focusing
- Focus modes: Normal / AF Macro / Zoom Macro
- Focus areas: Normal: 30 cm - infinity / 200 cm - infinity / AF Macro / MF /Intelligent Auto / Motion Picture: Wide 1 cm - infinity / 100 cm – infinity

Flash
- Flash: built-in

Shutter
- Frame rate: 3,7 - 10
- Shutter speeds: 60 - 1/2000

General
- LCD screen: 3.0" TFT LCD
- Battery: Li-ion Battery Pack (7.2V, 895mAh)
- Dimensions: 120,3 x 79,8 x 91,9 mm
- Weight: 498 g (18 oz) with Battery and SD Memory Card

Panasonic Lumix DMC-FZ48 is a digital camera by Panasonic Lumix. The highest-resolution pictures it records is 12.1 megapixels, through its 25mm Leica DC VARIO-ELMARIT.

== Property ==
- 24x optical zoom and 32x intelligent zoom
- 2.8 LEICA DC VARIO-ELMARIT lens with Nano Surface Coating technology
- Full HD movie
- Active POWER O.I.S. mode
- Photo 3D
