= Panasonic Lumix DMC-TZ40 =

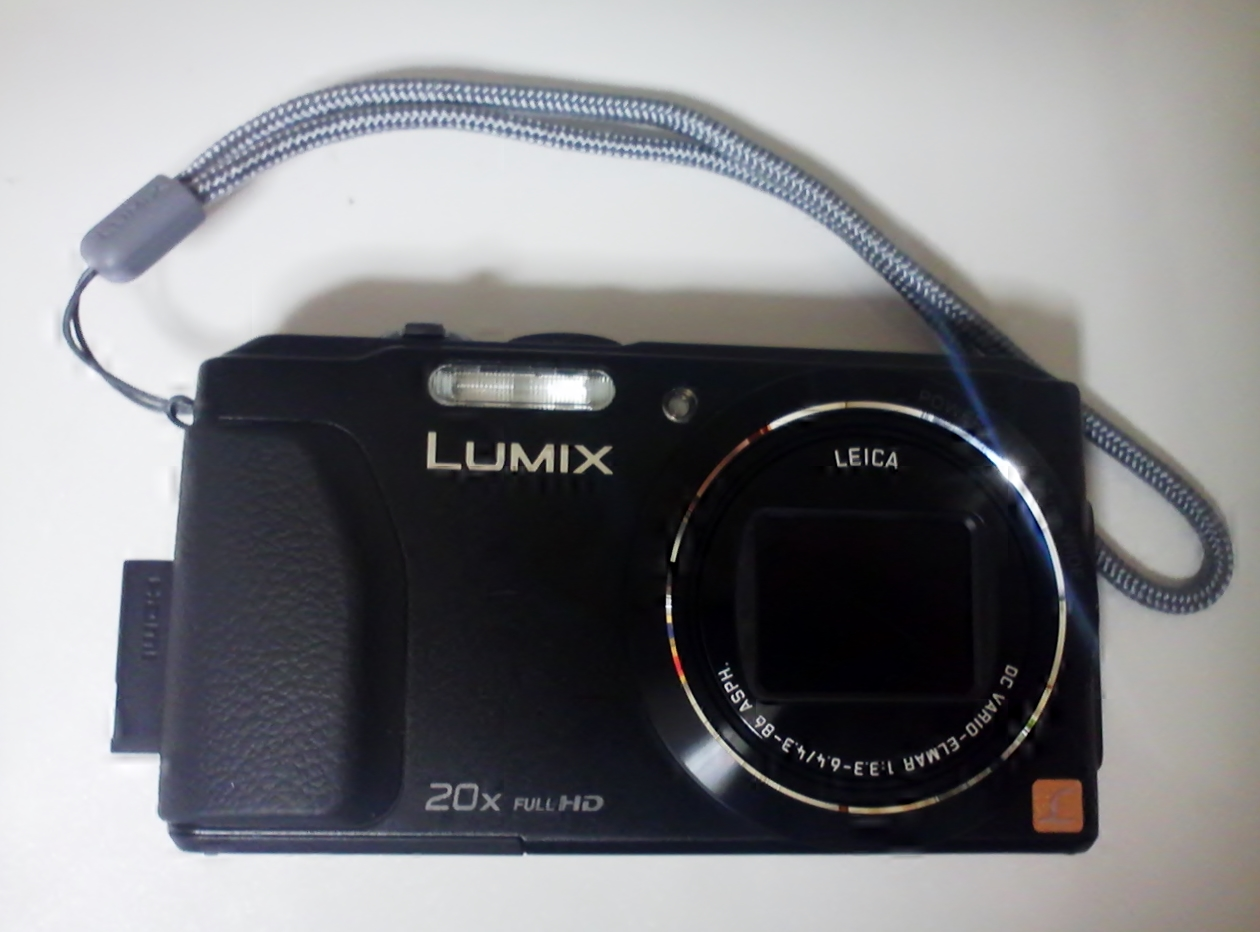

Overview
- Maker: Panasonic Lumix
- Type: Compact

Lens
- Lens: Leica DC Vario-Elmar
- F-numbers: 3.3–6.4

Sensor/medium
- Sensor type: MOS
- Sensor size: 18.1 megapixels
- Maximum resolution: 4896 × 3672
- Film speed: ISO 100–6400
- Storage media: SD, SDHC, SDXC

Flash
- Flash: built-in

Shutter
- Shutter speeds: 4–1/2000

Viewfinder
- Viewfinder: None

General
- Video recording: 1920 × 1080 pixels, 50p (FHD: 28 Mbps / AVCHD) (Sensor output is 50fps)
- LCD screen: 3.0" LCD
- Battery: Li-ion battery pack ID-Security (3.6 V, 1250mAh, 4.5Wh)
- Dimensions: 108.3×58.9×27.7 mm (4.26×2.32×1.09 in)
- Weight: 198 g (7 oz) with battery and SD memory card
- Made in: Japan

Panasonic Lumix DMC-TZ40 (also known as the DMC-TZ41 or DMC-ZS30) is a digital camera by Panasonic Lumix. The highest-resolution pictures it records is 18.1 megapixels.

== Properties ==
- Leica DC Vario-Elmar lens
- 20x optical zoom
- High sensitivity MOS sensor
- Hybrid O.I.S.+ (optical image stabilizer)
