= Panasonic Lumix DMC-FZ150 =

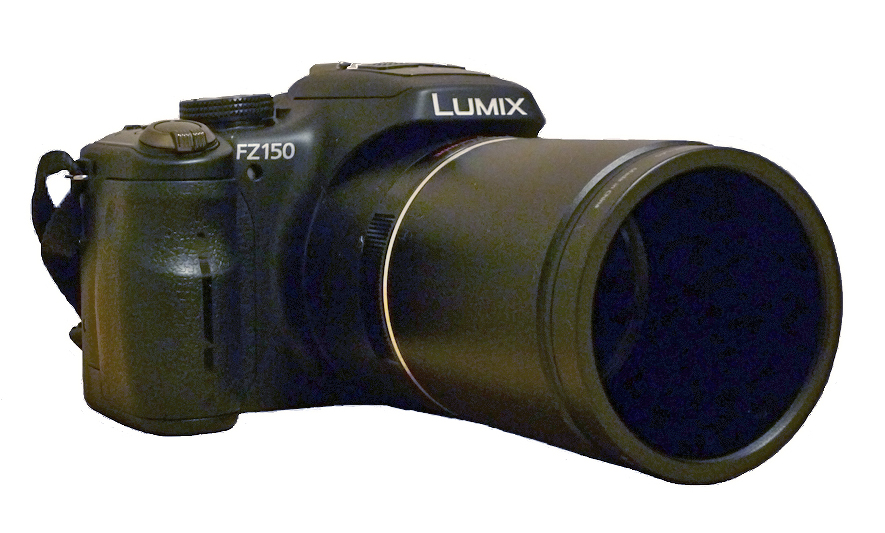

Overview
- Maker: Panasonic Lumix
- Type: Bridge digital camera

Lens
- Lens: LEICA DC VARIO-ELMARIT
- F-numbers: 2.8 - 5.2

Sensor/medium
- Sensor type: MOS
- Sensor size: 1/2.3 inch
- Maximum resolution: 4000 x 3000 (12 megapixels)
- Storage media: SD, SDHC, SDXC

Focusing
- Focus modes: Normal / AF Macro / MF / Quick AF ON/OFF, Continuous AF On/Off
- Focus areas: Normal: Wide 50 cm - infinity / Tele 100 cm - infinity Macro / Intelligent AUTO/ motion picture: Wide 3 cm - infinity / Tele 100 cm - infinity

Flash
- Flash: built-in

Shutter
- Frame rate: 5.5 - 12
- Shutter speeds: 15 - 1/2000

Viewfinder
- Viewfinder: Electronic

General
- LCD screen: 3.0" Free-Angle TFT Screen LCD
- Battery: Li-ion Battery Pack (7.2V, Minimum: 895mAh)
- Dimensions: 124.3×81.7×95.2 mm (4.89×3.22×3.75 in)
- Weight: 484 g (17 oz) without Battery and SD Memory Card

Panasonic Lumix DMC-FZ150 is a digital camera by Panasonic Lumix. The highest-resolution pictures it records is 12.1 megapixels, through its 25 mm Leica DC VARIO-ELMARIT. The camera was released for sale in the autumn of 2011. Its successor was the Panasonic Lumix DMC-FZ200.

== Property ==
- Ultra Wide-Angle 25 mm
- Long Zoom 24X with Power O.I.S
- 32X With Intelligent Zoom Technology and Electronic Zoom Lever
- Leica DC Optics with Exclusive LUMIX Nano Surface Coating
- Full 1080/60p HD Movies
- New LUMIX Light Speed AF and Venus Engine Technologies
