= Panasonic Lumix DMC-LZ2 =

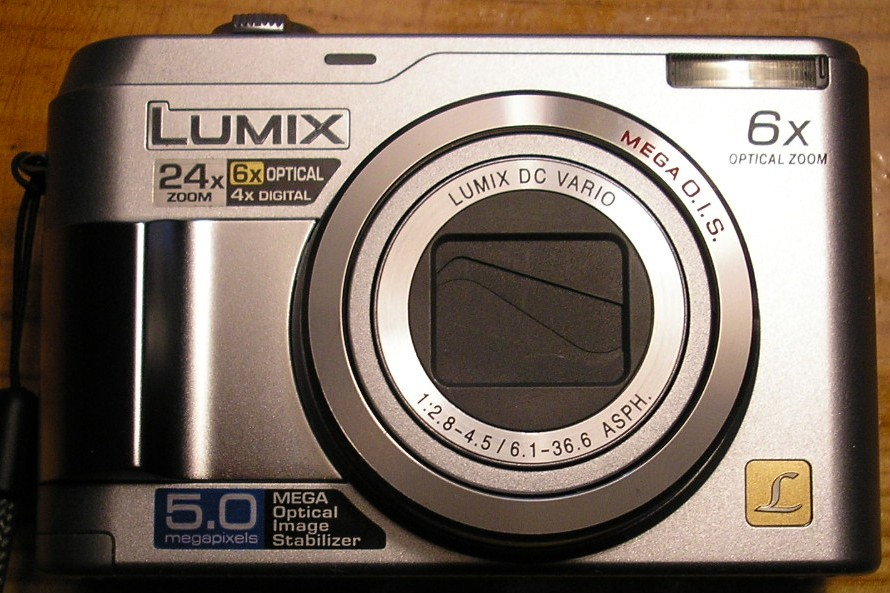

Overview
- Maker: Panasonic Holdings Corporation
- Type: Point-and-shoot

Lens
- Lens: 37-222 mm equiv., F2.8-4.5

Sensor/medium
- Sensor: CCD
- Maximum resolution: 2,560 × 1,920 (5 million)
- Film speed: ISO 80, 100, 200, 400
- Storage media: Secure Digital Card and Multi Media Card

Flash
- Flash: Internal

Shutter
- Continuous shooting: 3 frame/s

Viewfinder
- Viewfinder: Liquid crystal display

General
- LCD screen: 2.0 in (50.8 mm)
- Battery: 2 x AA batteries
- Made in: Japan

The Panasonic Lumix DMC-LZ2 is a digital camera that was announced on February 8, 2005. It has Universal Serial Bus connectivity and a mass of 224 grams. It was replaced in 2006 by the LZ3. The camera has optical image stabilization, which alleviates camera shake problems. The camera lacks manual control over shutter speed and aperture and has no optical viewfinder.
