= Lumix =

Brand of digital cameras made by Panasonic

- Lumix logo

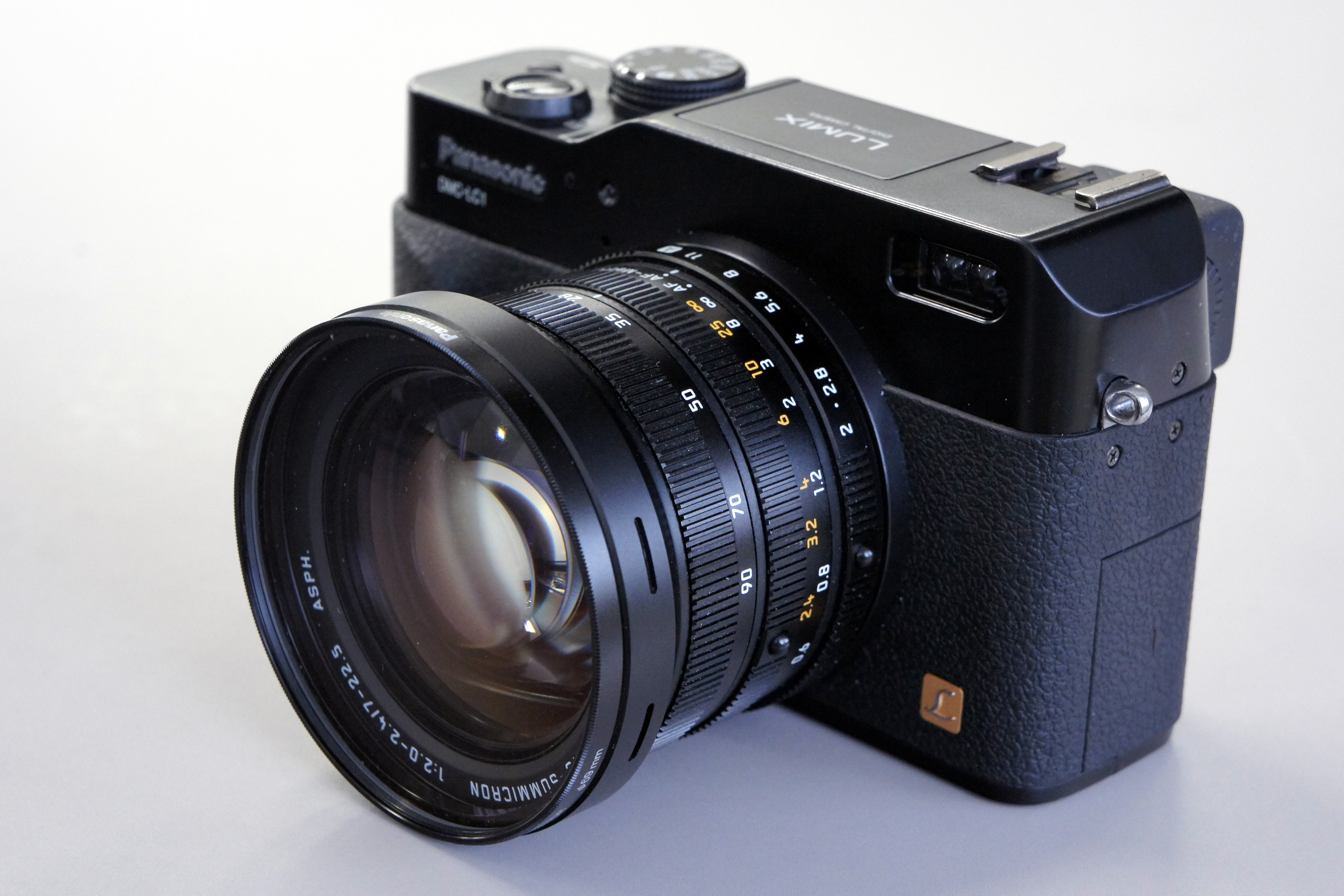
- Panasonic Lumix DMC-LC1 (2004)
- Product type: Digital cameras
- Current owner: Panasonic
- Country: Japan
- Introduced: 2001
- Ambassadors: Marco Reus, Ayumi Hamasaki, Karena Lam

Lumix is Panasonic's brand of digital cameras, ranging from pocket point-and-shoot models to digital SLRs and mirrorless cameras.

Compact digital cameras DMC-LC5 and DMC-F7 were the first products of the Lumix series, released in 2001. Most Lumix cameras use differing releases of the Panasonic Venus Engine for digital image processing; the original version (2002) was followed by II (2004), Plus (2005), III (2006), IV (2008), HD, V (2009) VI, HD II, VII FHD (2010, 2012, 2013), IX (2014), X (2017), and XI (2019).

Some Lumix models are branded with Leica lenses (e.g. Nocticron or Elmarit lenses), although Leica does not manufacture the lenses. Others are rebranded as Leica cameras with different cosmetic stylings.

Despite shifting focus to full frame cameras, Panasonic continues to release and support micro four thirds (MFT) cameras. As of 2023, the Lumix G9II is the flagship MFT camera of the range.

== Model lines ==
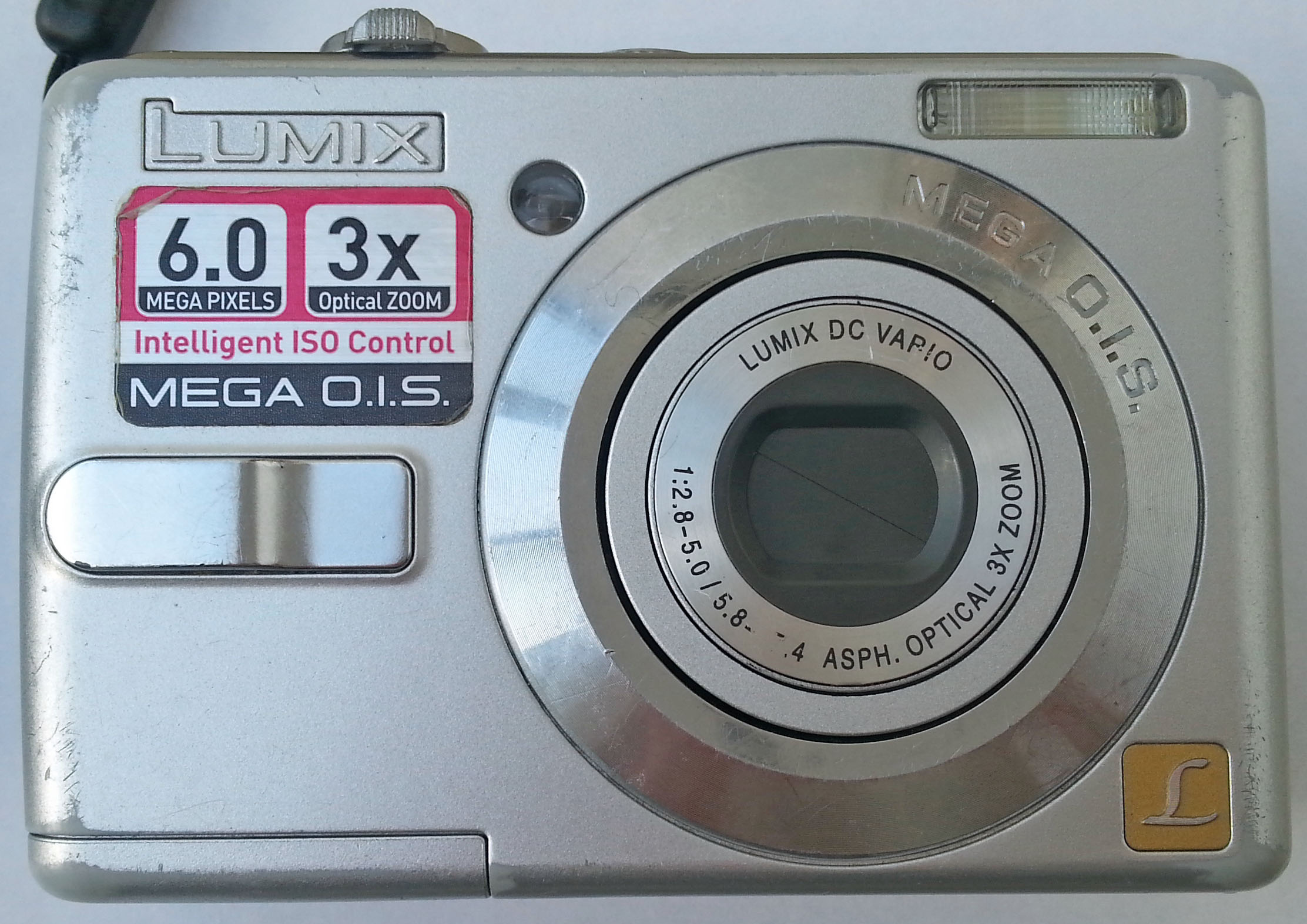
Panasonic DMC-LS60

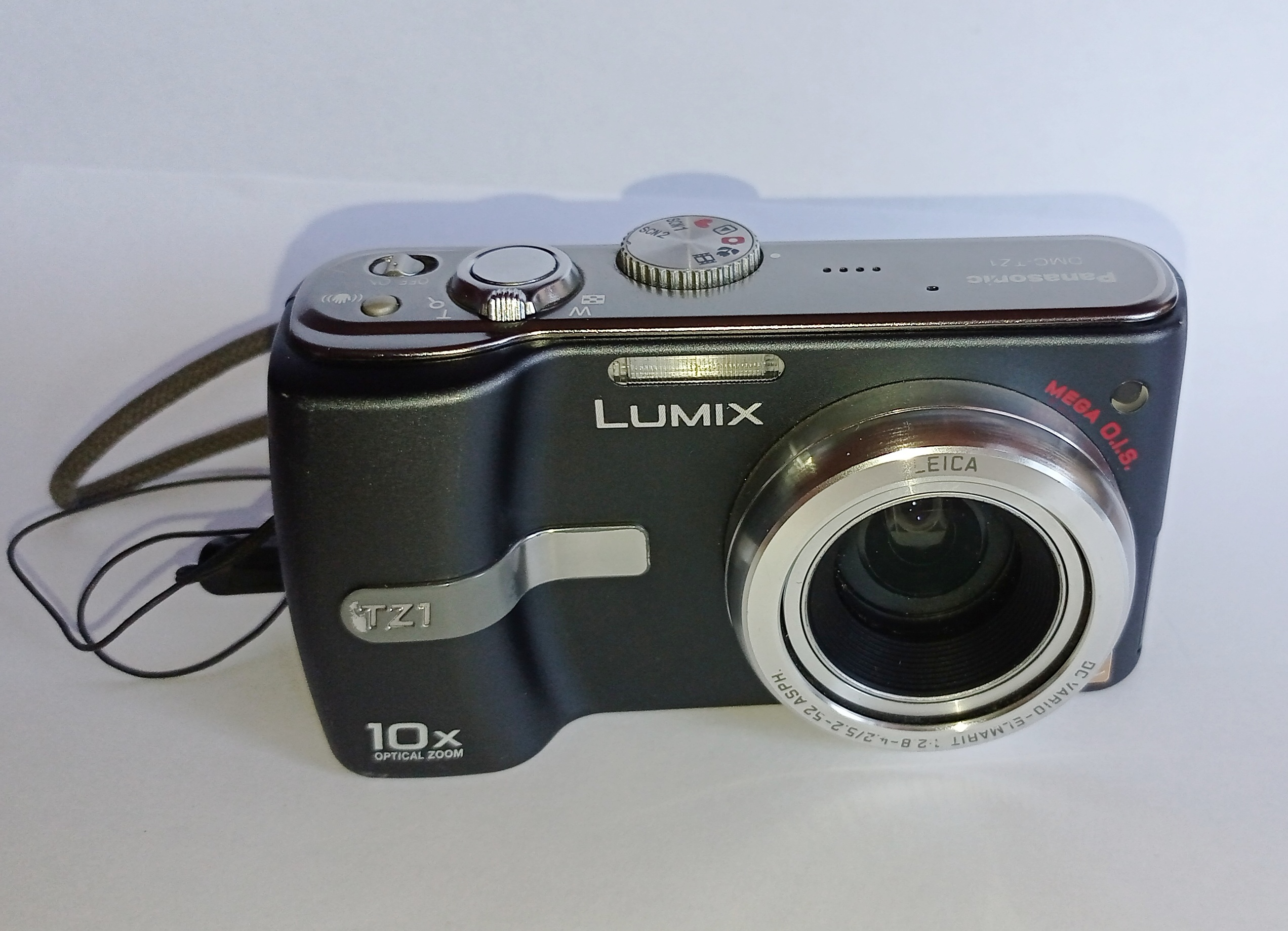
Panasonic Lumix DMC-TZ1

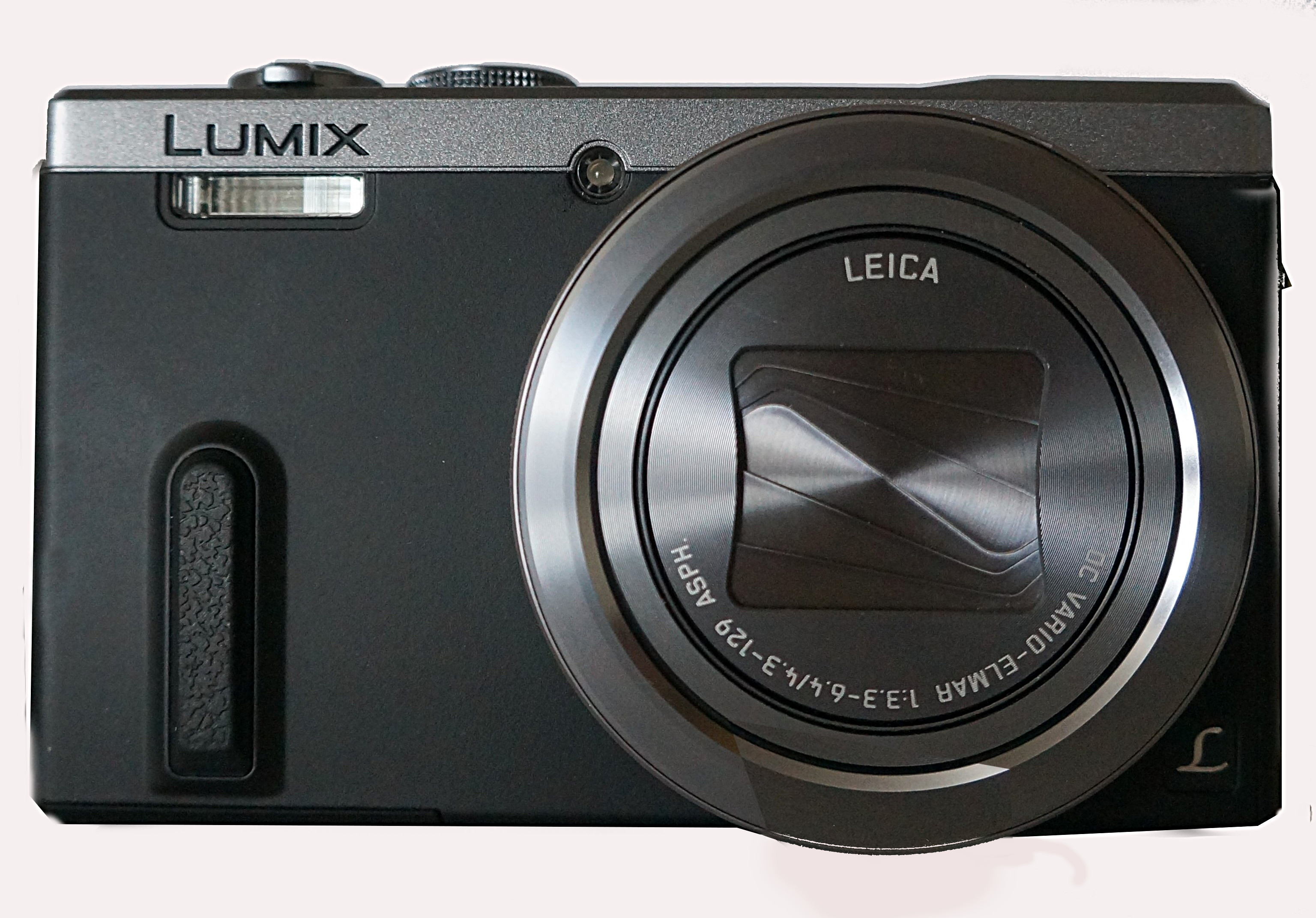
Panasonic Lumix DMC-TZ60

Some cameras are available in a choice of color, indicated by a suffix letter: K is black, S silver, A blue, R red, W white. Most lower-priced models have small sensors of about 10.2 mm / 1/2.5". More expensive ones often have sensors of about twice the area, 14.1 mm to 15.4 mm / 1/1.65" to 1/1.8". dSLRs and Micro Four Thirds system cameras have much larger sensors. Larger sensors produce a better image signal-to-noise ratio and better dynamic range. The GH series of Micro Four Thirds cameras, and the LX100, have a unique "multi-aspect" sensor, that is larger than the lens image circle. This allows three different aspect ratios, 4:3, 3:2 and 16:9, to be used natively. As a result, the image diagonal remains the same in all three aspect ratios and provides full coverage of the sensor, and a larger field of view with higher resolution than one would get by simply cropping the 4:3 aspect to the narrower ratios.

=== Current ===
- DMC-FX: ultra-compact high-end, relatively typical cameras. Unlike most of the other Lumix lines, the FX series tends to have a more stylish look (as opposed to the generic silver or black), targeted at social photography. The FX30 was announced as the world's slimmest camera with a 28 mm equivalent wide-angle lens. The FX500 is the first Panasonic to feature a touch-screen interface.
- DMC-FH: alternative name for certain DMC-FX models, used for marketing in North America.
- DMC-FZx (excluding DMC-FZx0 models): compact ultra-zoom higher-end cameras. These cameras are described as compact but are relatively large, have extensive controls (although models earlier than the FZ7 do not have manual focus), and long zoom ranges, typically 12× with extending zoom lens.
- DMC-FZxx: bridge digital cameras, resemble digital SLRs in many ways, but have a non-interchangeable, non-extending zoom lens. The FZ70/72 bridge camera is as large and heavy as a medium-sized DSLR, has a 1/2.3" sensor, a very wide zoom range (20-1200mm, 60×) and extensive manual controls, including fully manual focus, and zoom rings on the lens. The FZ200 has a 25–600 mm lens (35 mm equivalent) superzoom with f/2.8 light sensitivity through the whole range and shoots 12 MP stills and full HD video with 24/30/50/60 fps and 120 or 200 fps for slow motion. FZ1000 uses a 1" sensor (as does the Sony RX10). Compared to the RX10, the FZ1000 can shoot 4K video, is priced considerably lower and has double the optical zoom, but no built-in ND Filter and no fixed aperture.
- DMC/DC-G: Micro Four Thirds system line, advertised as a "reinvented DSLR" without mirror.
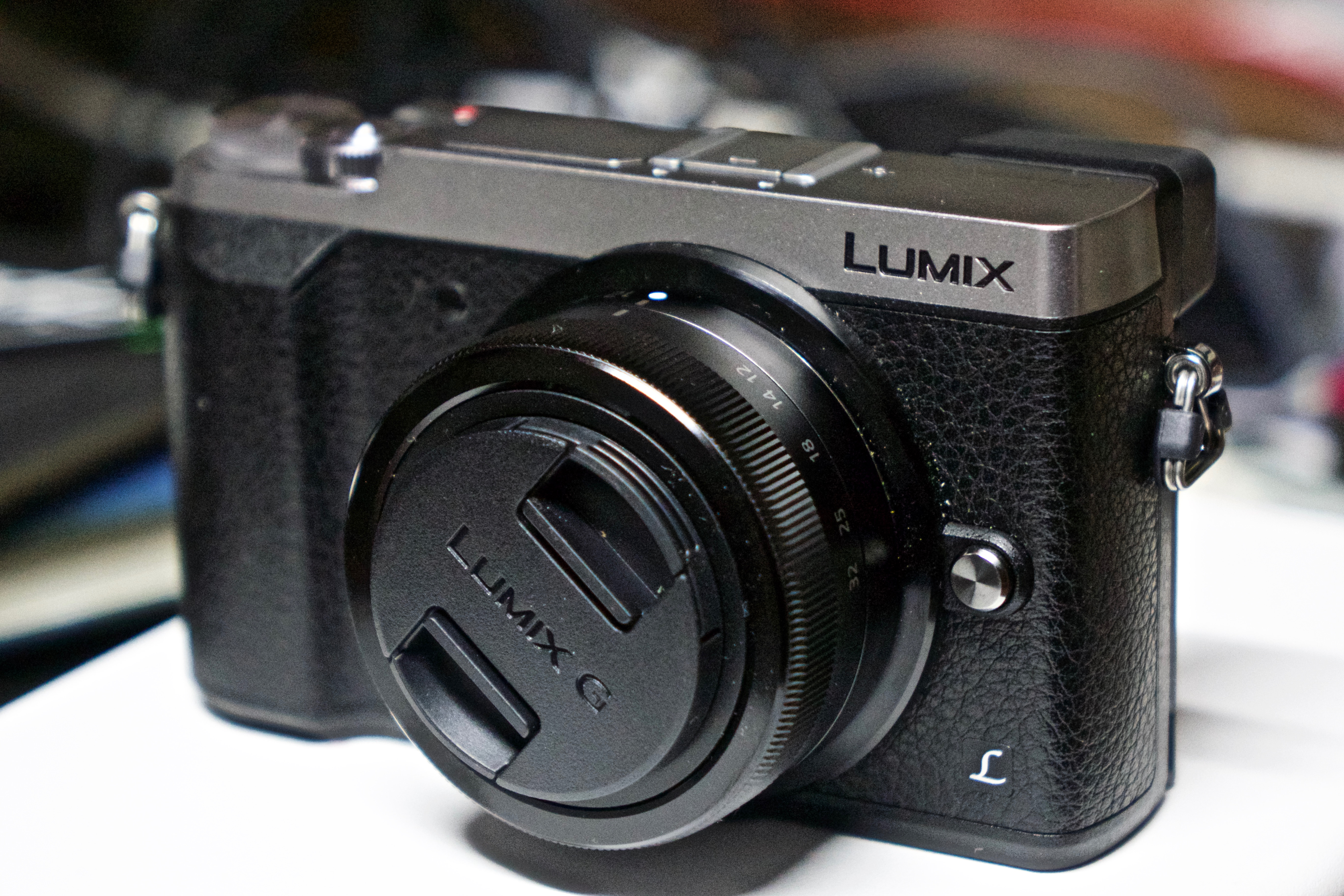
  Panasonic Lumix DMC-GX80/DMC-GX85/GX7 Mark II (2016)
  - DMC-G: SLR-style mirrorless cameras, from the mid-range to the high-end category.
    - G1-G9, G80/85, G90/95: standard mirrorless line.
    - G100/110: simplified SLR-style mirrorless camera, intended mainly for vloggers.
    - G9: Panasonic's highest-end photography oriented Micro Four Thirds camera, replaced in September 2023 by the successor DC-G9M2.
  - DMC-GH: video oriented high-end SLR-style mirrorless line.
  - DMC-GF: lower end rangefinder-style mirrorless cameras without a viewfinder or a hot shoe.
  - DMC-GX: rangefinder-style mirrorless cameras in the mid- and lower-range.
    - GX1: rangefinder-style mirrorless camera without a viewfinder, but with a hot shoe.
    - GX7-9: rangefinder-style mirrorless camera with an electronic viewfinder and similar capabilities to the DMC-G-line.
    - GX80/85/7 Mark II: lower-end version of the GX8, but maintaining the electronic viewfinder and the hot shoe.
    - GX800/850/GF9: the continuation of the GF-series, but named as GX800 in Europe and GX850 in North-America.
- DC-S: full frame mirrorless line using the L-mount.
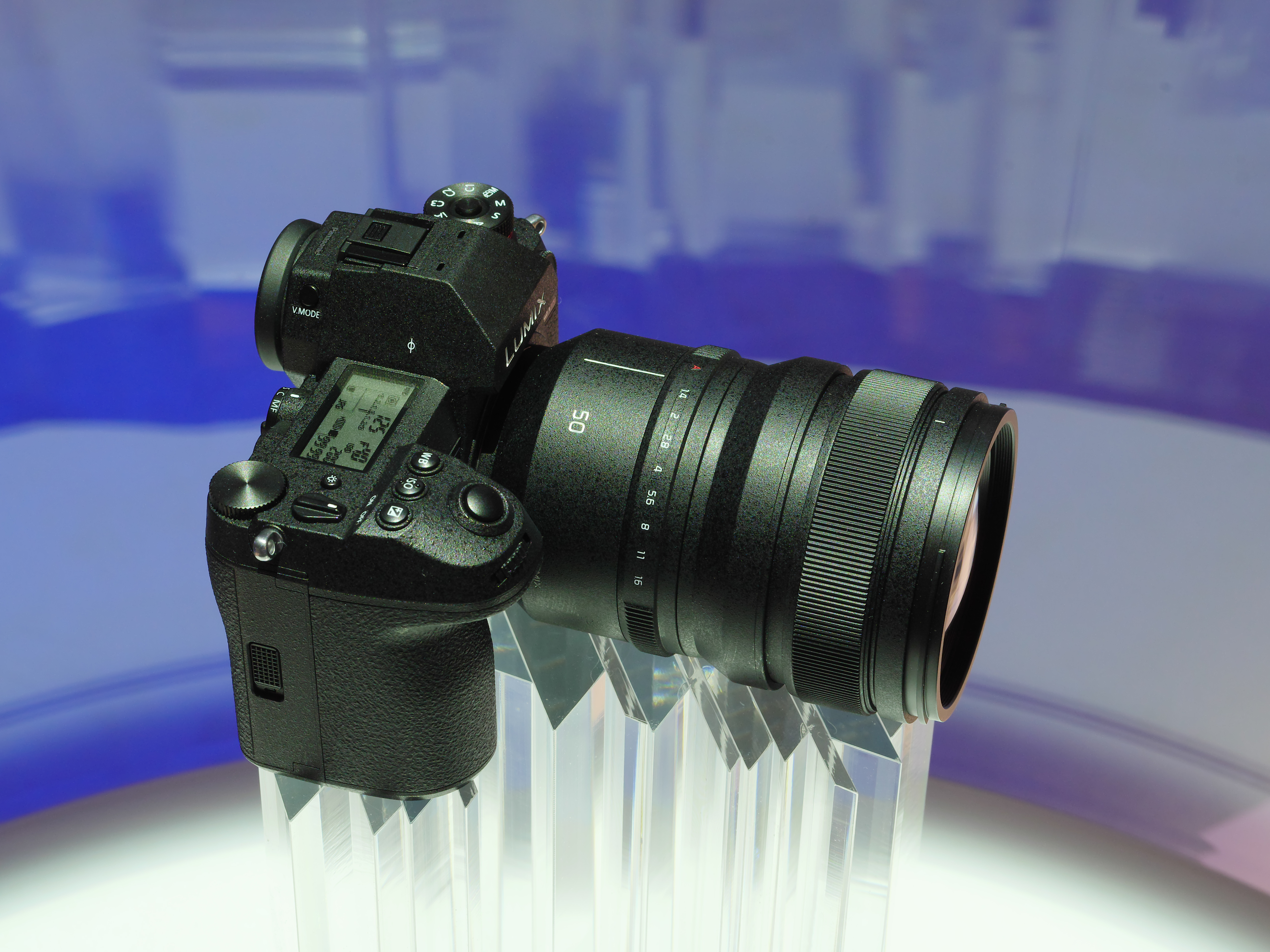
  Panasonic Lumix S1R with prime lens 50 mm f/1.4
  - S1: high-end full frame mirrorless camera with contrast detection autofocus.
    - S1R: ultra-high resolution version of the S1 series.
    - S1H: video oriented version of the S1 series.
  - S5: mid-range full frame mirrorless camera with contrast detection autofocus.
  - S5II / S5IIX: successor to the S5 with phase detect autofocus, real-time LUTs applied in camera, and 3:2 aspect ratio open gate recording mode in 6k.
  - S9: compact full-frame mirrorless camera aimed squarely at social media content creators, available in various colors, and features the Lumix Lab smartphone app.
- DMC-L: DSLR line. It uses the Four Thirds system lens mount and, along with the Olympus E-330, was one of the first DSLRs capable of displaying a live image view on the LCD screen.
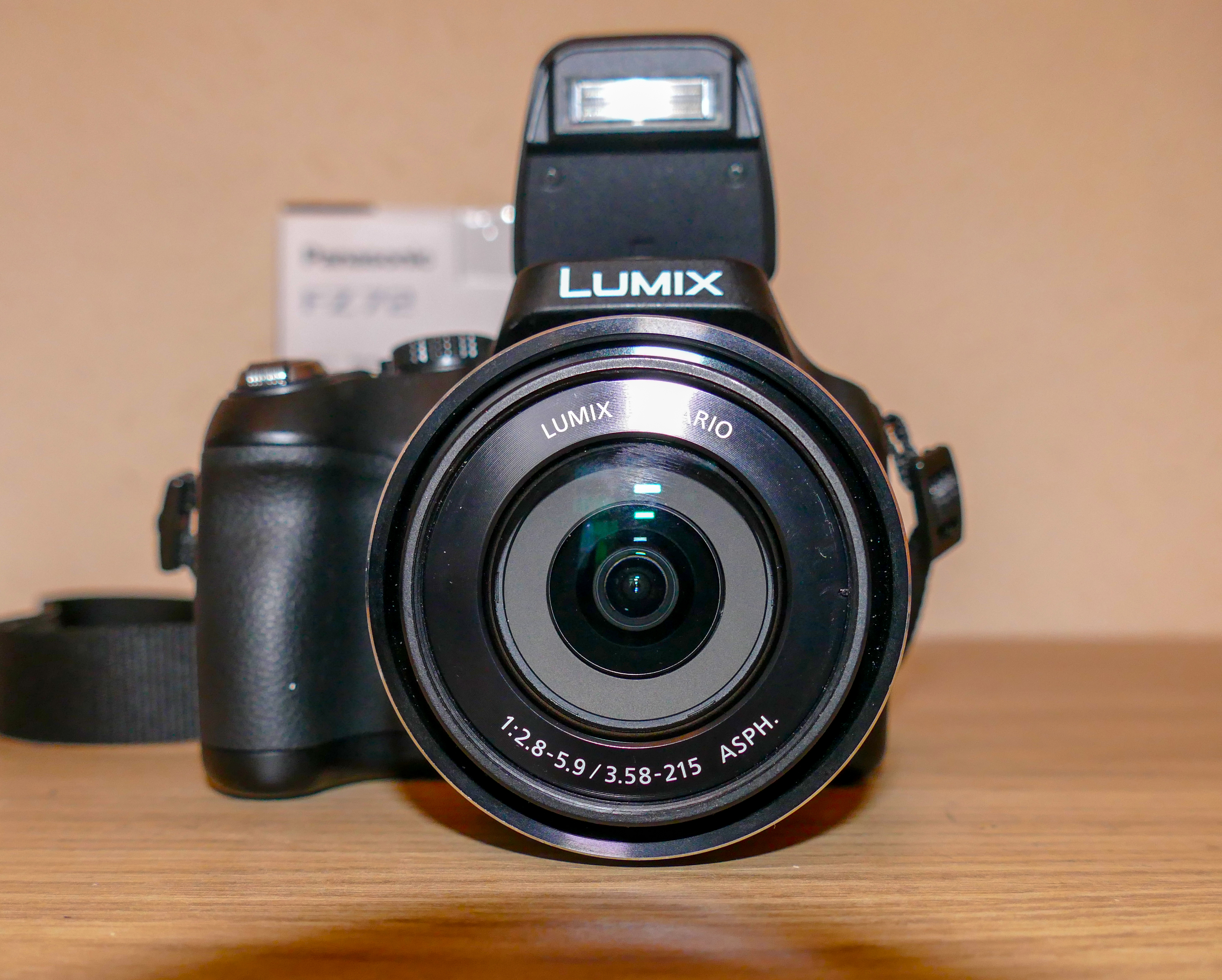
  Panasonic FZ72
- DMC-LS: cheapest line, budget plastic compact cameras powered by two AA batteries.
- DMC-LX: compact high-end camera line, with full manual exposure and focus controls (with joystick control rather than focus ring), and RAW recording, unusual in compact cameras.
- DMC-LZ: budget, but more advanced and with more user control than many other digital compact cameras. The most notable feature is a 6× (37–222 mm) optical zoom range.
- DMC-SZ: mid-level compact superzoom cameras. SZ-series stands for "style zoom". Introduced in January 2012, these cameras use the 25 mm ultra-wide angle LEICA DC VARIO-ELMAR lens, have a 10× optical zoom, and shoot high definition video. Models include the SZ1, SZ5, SZ7 and SZ9.
- DMC-TS / DMC-FT: waterproof, shockproof and dustproof point and shoot cameras.
- DMC-TZ: (Travel Zoom) compact, point and shoot zoom cameras with image stabilization. The TZ1 uses folded optics, with a prism. TZ1's successors use a traditional design without folded optics, hence the barrel extends further out during operation. The TZ series stands out against other compact digital cameras by achieving up to 30× optical zoom with a 24 mm wide angle lens (equivalent to 35 mm camera) in a small, compact body.
- DMC-ZS: alternative names for certain DMC-TZ models, used for marketing in North America.
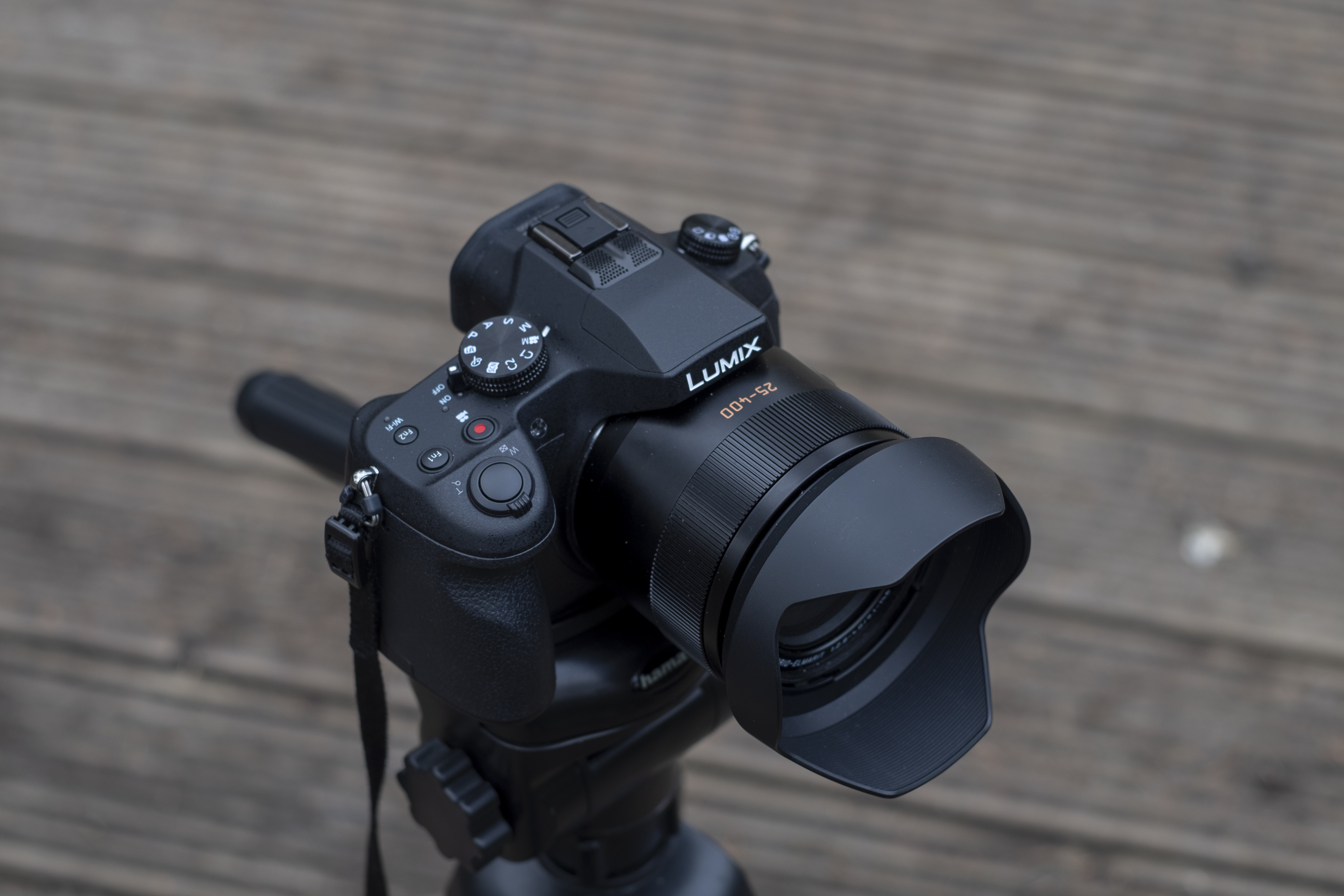
  FZ1000

=== Discontinued ===
- DMC-FS: ultra-compact mid-range, relatively typical cameras. The FS range was launched in January 2008.
- DMC-LC: medium-compact-size, mid-range, but also included high-end models.
- DMC-GM: marketed as the smallest interchangeable lens camera.

== Product development highlights ==
- 2001

Released high-end compact camera DMC-LC5 equipped with "Leica · DC · VARIO · SUMIKRON lens"
Released Ultra Compact Camera DMC-F7 equipped with "Leica · DC · Barrio · Elmarito lens"DMC-F1

- 2002

"Venus Engine" installed (DMC-F1, DMC-FZ1)
World's first "optical 12× zoom" mounted (DMC-FZ1)
"Image stabilization (MEGA OIS)" mounted (DMC-FZ1)

- 2003

World's first Ultra Compact Camera equipped with "Image stabilizer (MEGA OIS)" (DMC-FX5, DMC-FX1)

- 2004

"Venus Engine II" installed (DMC - FX 7, DMC - FX 2, DMC - FZ 20)
"2.5-inch power LCD" mounted (DMC-FX 7)

- Year 2005

"Venus Engine Plus" installed (DMC-FX 8, DMC-FX 9)
"Free angle liquid crystal" mounted (DMC - FZ 30)
World's first "16: 9 CCD" mounted (DMC-LX 1)
"High-definition power LCD" mounted (DMC-FZ30, DMC-FX8, DMC-FX9)

- 2006

World's smallest single lens type digital camera with "optical 10× zoom" (DMC-TZ1)
"Venus Engine III" & "Flexible collapsible lens" (DMC-TZ1)
World's first successful mass-production of "ultra-high refraction glass", "wide-angle 28 mm lens" mounted (DMC-FX 01)
World's first "motion recognition" installed (DMC-FX 07)
"Four Thirds mounting mechanism" & "Leica D Barrio · Elmarito lens" adopted (DMC-L1)
"Non-dust system" & "Live MOS sensor" loaded (DMC-L1)

- 2007DMC-FX 100

World's smallest, "optical 10× zoom" mounted with a wide-angle 28 mm mounted monocular type digital camera (DMC-TZ 3)
World's thinnest with a wide-angle 28 mm mounted model (DMC-FX 30)
"3.0 high-definition power LCD" mounted (DMC-FX50)
World's first "wide-angle 28 mm loaded model" equipped with "12.2 million pixel CCD" (DMC-FX100)
World's first "Intelligent Auto (iA)" installed (DMC-FX33, DMC-FX55) DMC-L 10

- 2008

World's first digital SLR camera equipped with "Free Angle LCD" & "Face Recognition AF / AE" (DMC-L10, DMC-L10K)
"Leica D Barrio · Elmer Lens" adopted (DMC - L 10)
World's smallest, "optical 10× zoom" mounted with a wide-angle 28 mm mounted monocular type digital camera (DMC-TZ 5)
"Venus Engine IV" installed (DMC-FX 35)
"Dark portion correction" & "Digital red eye correction" mounted (DMC - FX 35)
World's first "touch motion tracking AF / AE" mounted (DMC-FX 500)
"Chasing focus" is installed (DMC-FX 37)
"Leica · DC · Vario · Sumikuron lens" mounted (DMC-LX 3)
"Venus Engine HD" loaded (DMC-G1)
" Micro Four Thirds Mounting Mechanism " & "Lumix G Barrio Lens" adopted (DMC-G1)
By adopting "mirrorless structure", it achieves the world's smallest and lightest with digital single lens camera (DMC-G1)
"W Live View" loaded (DMC-G1)

- 2009

Optical 12× zoom mounted Monocular type digital camera realizes the world's smallest (DMC-TZ 7)
World's first compact digital camera with " AVCHD Lite movie shooting function" (DMC - TZ 7, DMC - FT 1)
"Waterproof, dustproof, anti-shock function & bending type lens" adopted (DMC-FT1)
"Leica · DC · Vario · Elmar Lens" mounted (DMC - TZ 7, DMC - FT 1)
Equipped with "personal recognition" (DMC - FX 40, DMC - FX 550, DMC - TZ 7, DMC - FT 1)
"Venus Engine V" installed (DMC - FX 40, DMC - FX 550)
Equipped with "New Shake Reduction (POWER OIS)" (DMC-FX60, DMC-ZX1, DMC-FP8, DMC-FZ38)
Equipped with "speed focus" (DMC - FX 60, DMC - ZX 1, DMC - FP 8, DMC - FZ 38)
The world's thinnest 0.3 mm ultra-thin aspheric glass lens is mounted, achieving the thinnest in Lumix history (DMC-FX 60)DMC-GF 1
Flash built-in lens interchangeable digital camera realizes world's smallest and lightest(DMC-GF1)

- 2010

"Venus Engine VI" installed (DMC-FX66)
"Venus Engine HD II" installed (DMC-ZX3, DMC-TZ10, DMC-FT2)
"DMC - FX 66, DMC - ZX 3, DMC - TZ 10, DMC - FT 2" equipped with "super resolution technology"
Equipped with "iA zoom" (DMC-FX66, DMC-ZX3, DMC-TZ10, DMC-FT2)
Thin and bent type lenses are adopted, achieving the thinnest in the history of luminescence (DMC-FP1)
Brepita mode is installed (DMC - FX 70)
Finder-equipped lens interchangeable digital camera realizes world's lightest weight (DMC-G10)
"Venus Engine FHD" installed (DMC-FZ100, DMC-LX5, DMC-FX700)
"MOS sensor" mounted (DMC-FZ100, DMC-FX700)
Realizes the world's fastest, high-speed continuous shooting of about 11 frames / sec (DMC-FZ100)

- 2011

"Nano surface coating" which reduces flare and ghost is adopted (DMC - TZ 20, DMC - FZ 150, DMC - FZ 48)
Realizes the world's fastest, high-speed continuous shooting of about 12 frames / sec (DMC-FZ150)
"High sensitivity MOS sensor" which improved light receiving sensitivity from conventional MOS is installed (DMC - FZ 150)
"High speed CCD" which speeds up reading speed from conventional CCD is installed (DMC - FZ 48)
Panasonic showed a prototype of a planned 3D Lumix camera in September 2011, saying that it would have twin 4× zoom lenses with folding optics and optical image stabilization for both video and still images.

- 2012

The world's thinnest, as thin as about 20.2 times zooming digital camera realized about 28.2 mm (DMC-TZ30)
Newly developed "new high sensitivity MOS sensor" mounted (DMC-TZ30, DMC-SZ7)
As world's first lens integral digital camera realized F 2.8 brightness at 600 mm (DMC-FZ 200)
World's first realization of F1.4 brightness as a lens integrated digital camera (DMC-LX 7)

- 2013

"5-axis hybrid camera shake correction" & "tilt correction" mounted (DMC-TZ40)
Equipped with "NFC (short range wireless communication)" aimed at cooperation with smartphones (DMC - TZ 40)

- 2014

First Mirrorless Interchangeable Lens Camera capable of 4K UHD and DCI 4K video recording (DMC-GH4)

- 2017

The highest-end photography oriented camera from Panasonic (DC-G9)

- 2018

Panasonic collaborated with Sigma and Leica to form the L-mount Alliance on 25 September 2018, and license the L-mount system for their own lines of lenses and cameras.

- 2019

in 2019 Panasonic announced the release of its new S-series line of mirrorless cameras.
The first Panasonic cameras to offer a full frame (35mm) sensor size. (DC-S-series)
The first mirrorless interchangeable lens camera capable of recording 4K at 60p internally. (DC-S1)
The highest resolution MILC at the time (47.3 MPx). (DC-S1R)
The first MILC capable of internal 6K and 10-bit 4K/60p video recording. (DC-S1H)

== Model history ==
Type	Venus Engine													
Type	Non-installing	Venus I (2002)	Venus II (2004)	Venus Plus (2005)	Venus III (2005)	Venus IV (2008)	Venus HD (2008)	Venus V (2009)	Venus VI (2010)	Venus HD II (2010)	Venus VII FHD (2010, upgraded in 2012, 2013)	Venus IX (2014)	Venus X (2017)	Venus XI (2019)
High-end; Ultra-Compact					FX100	FX150		FX580 / FX550			FX700			
Ultra-Compact, Wide-angle				FX01	FX50 / FX30 / FX55 / FX33	FX35 / FX500		FX48 / FP8 / ZX1 / FX550	FX66	ZR3 / ZX3	FX78			
Ultra-Compact	F7	F1 / FX5 / FX1	FX7 / FX2	FX8 / FX3 / FX9	FX12	FS3 / FS5 / FS6 / FS7 / FS15 / FS20 / FS25								
High-end; Compact	LC5	LC1	LX1		LX2	LX3					LX5 / LX7	LX100	ZS60/ ZS70/ ZS100/ ZS200	
Compact, Wide-angle, Large Zoom					TZ1 / TZ2 / TZ3	TZ4 / TZ5 / TZ15 / TZ50 / ZS1	ZS3		ZS5 / ZS8	ZS7	ZS10 (TZ20) / ZS15 (TZ25) / ZS20 (TZ30) / ZS25 (TZ35)/ ZS30 (TZ40) /	TZ56 / TZ57 / ZS45 / TZ61 / TZ70 / TZ80 / TZ100	TZ90	TZ95 / TZ200 / TZ220
Compact, Medium Zoom				LZ1 / LZ2 / LZ3 / LZ5	LZ6 / LZ7	LZ8 / LZ10								
Bridge, Ultra Zoom		FZ1 / FZ2 / FZ10	FZ3 / FZ5 / FZ7 / FZ30 / FZ20		FZ50 / FZ18 / FZ8	FZ28	FZ35 / FZ38			FZ40 / FZ45	FZ100 / FZ48 / FZ150 / FZ200	FZ1000		
Compact	LC40 / LC20	LC33 / LC43 / LC70		LS1 / LS2	LS60 / LS75 / LS80	LS85								
Four Thirds					L1 / L10									
Micro Four Thirds							G1 / GH1 / GF1			G2 /G10	GH2 / GF2 / GF3 / G3 / GX1 / GH3 / G5 / G6	GH4 / G7	G9 / GH5 / GH5S /GX9	
Full Frame L-mount														S1 / S1R / S1H
One Inch sensor														
Waterproof, shockproof and dust-proof						TS10	TS1			TS2	TS3 / TS4			

Note: Years shown in the header row are Venus Engine release years, not the camera release years.

Note: The Venus engine of the S-series full frame cameras is only referred to as "the new Venus Image Processor" by Panasonic.

== See also ==
- Panasonic
- Leica Camera

Brand	Form	Class	2008	2009	2010	2011			2012	2013	2014	2015	2016	2017	2018	2019	2020	2021	2022	2023	2024	2025	2026
Olympus	SLR style OM-D	Professional															E-M1X ^{R}						
Olympus	SLR style OM-D	High-end									E-M1			E-M1 II ^{R}			E-M1 III ^{R}						
Olympus	SLR style OM-D	Advanced							E-M5			E-M5 II ^{R}					E-M5 III ^{R}						
Olympus	SLR style OM-D	Mid-range									E-M10		E-M10 II		E-M10 III			E-M10 IV					
Olympus	Rangefinder style PEN	Mid-range		E-P1	E-P2		E-P3				E-P5		PEN-F ^{R}										
Olympus	Rangefinder style PEN	Upper-entry			E-PL1	E-PL2		E-PL3	E-PL5		E-PL6	E-PL7		E-PL8	E-PL9		E-PL10						
Olympus	Rangefinder style PEN	Entry-level					E-PM1		E-PM2														
Olympus	remote													Air									
OM System	SLR style	Professional																	OM-1 ^{R}		OM-1 II ^{R}		
OM System	SLR style	High-end																				OM-3 ^{R}	
OM System	SLR style	Advanced																		OM-5 ^{R}			OM-5 II ^{R}
OM System	PEN	Mid-range																	E-P7				
Panasonic	SLR style	High-end Video													GH5S				GH6 ^{R}			GH7 ^{R}	
Panasonic	SLR style	High-end Photo													G9 ^{R}						G9 II ^{R}		
Panasonic	SLR style	High-end		GH1		GH2			GH3		GH4				GH5				GH5II				
Panasonic	SLR style	Mid-range		G1	G2		G3		G5		G6		G7	G80/G85			G90/G95						
Panasonic	SLR style	Entry-level			G10													G100			G100D		
Panasonic	Rangefinder style	Advanced							GX1		GX7		GX8		GX9								
Panasonic	Rangefinder style	Mid-range									GM1	GM5	GX80/GX85										
Panasonic	Rangefinder style	Entry-level			GF1	GF2	GF3		GF5		GF6	GF7	GF8	GX800/GX850/GF9		GX880/GF10/GF90							
Panasonic	Camcorder	Professional							AG-AF104														
Kodak	Rangefinder style	Entry-level										S-1											
DJI	Drone	.												Zenmuse X5S									
DJI	Drone	.												Zenmuse X5									
YI	Rangefinder style	Entry-level												M1									
Yongnuo	Rangefinder style	Android camera															YN450M		YN455				
Blackmagic Design	Rangefinder style	High-End Video							Cinema Camera														
Blackmagic Design	Rangefinder style	High-End Video									Pocket Cinema Camera					Pocket Cinema Camera 4K							
Blackmagic Design		High-End Video										Micro Cinema Camera									Micro Studio Camera 4K G2		
Z CAM	Cinema	Advanced											E1			E2							
Z CAM	Cinema	Mid-Range																E2-M4					
Z CAM	Cinema	Entry-Level															E2C						
JVC	Camcorder	Professional										GY-LS300											
SVS-Vistek		Industrial							EVO Tracer														
