= Fujifilm FinePix S-series =

DSLR and bridge camera models

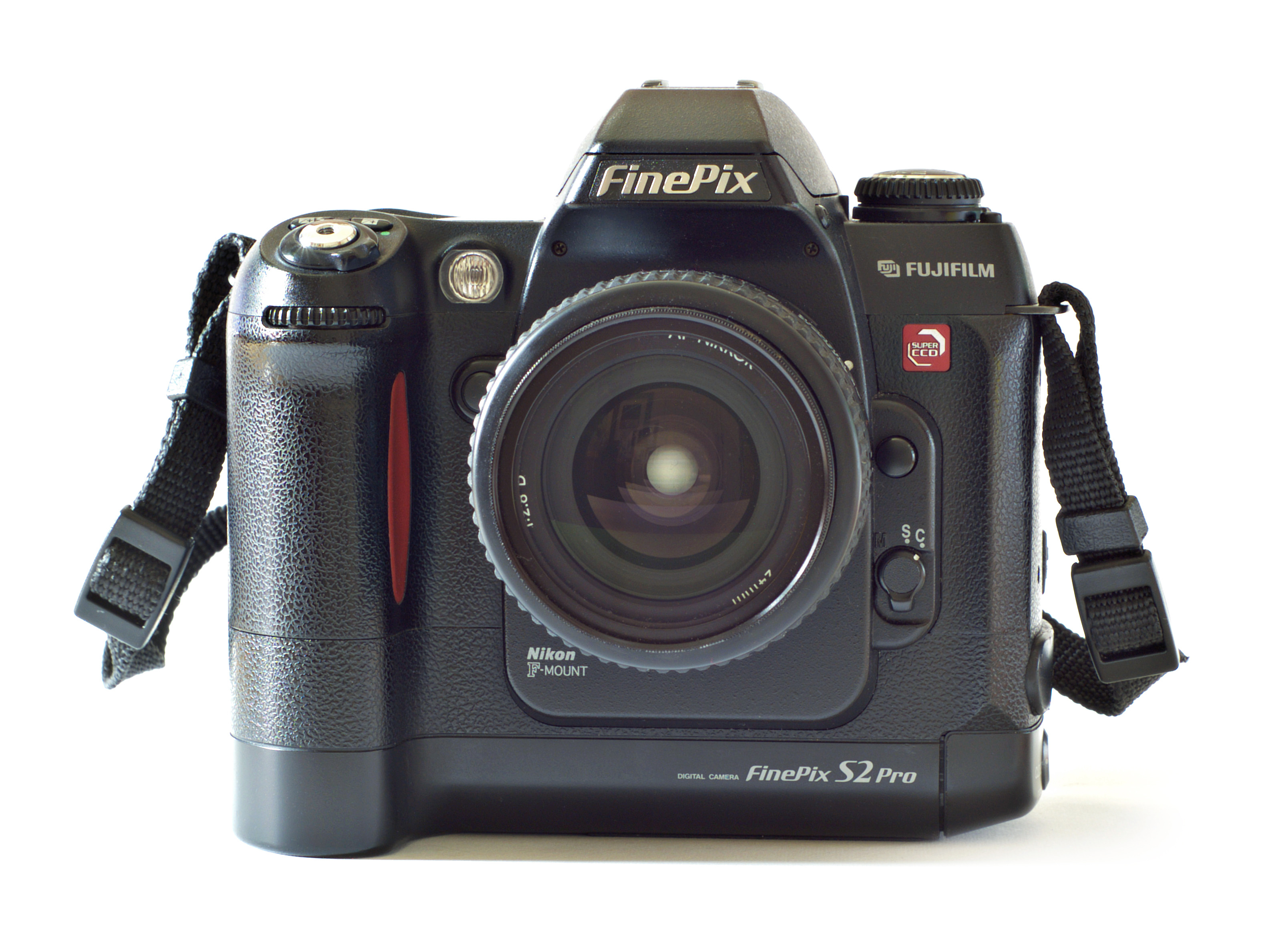
Fujifilm FinePix S2 Pro

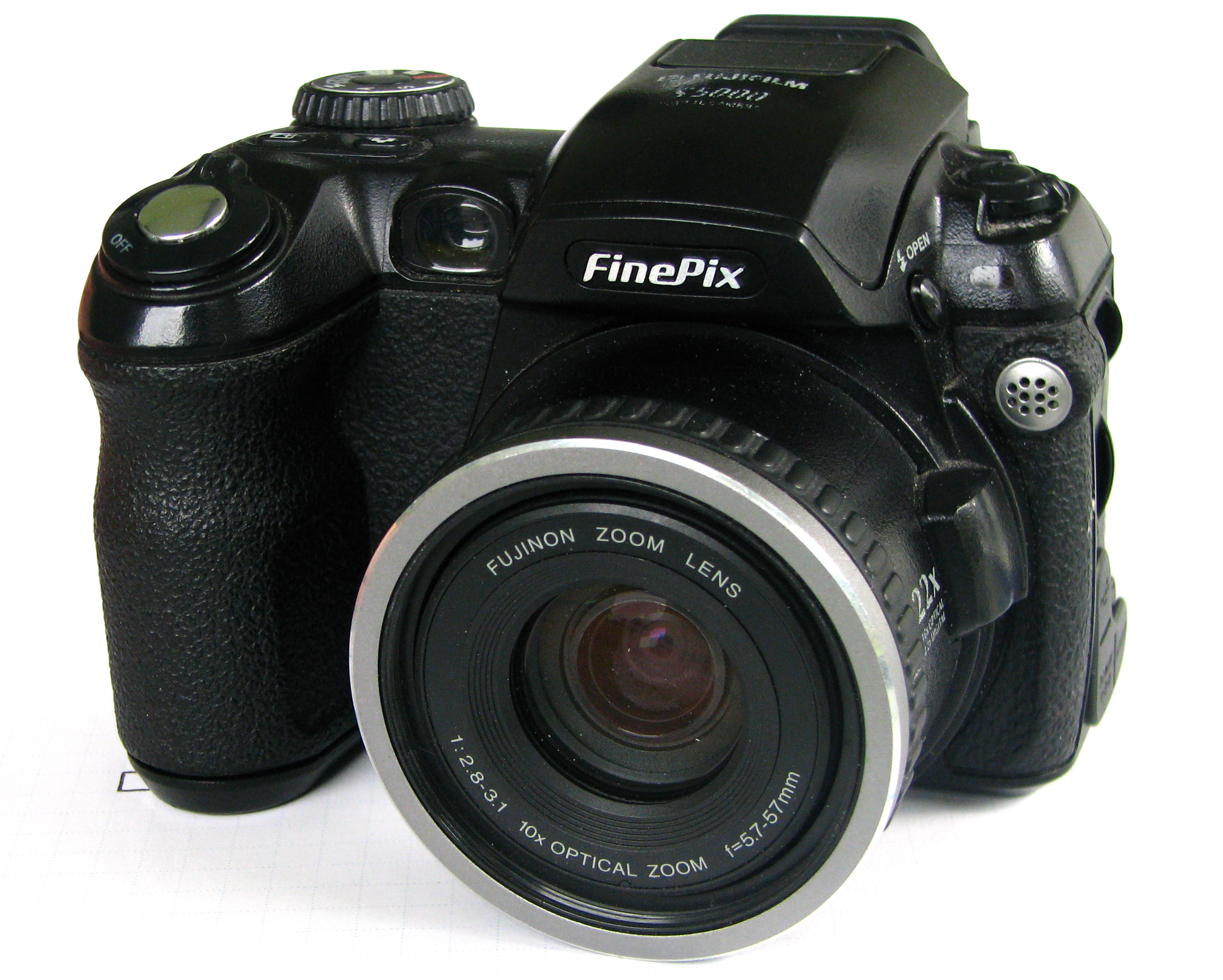
Fujifilm FinePix S5000

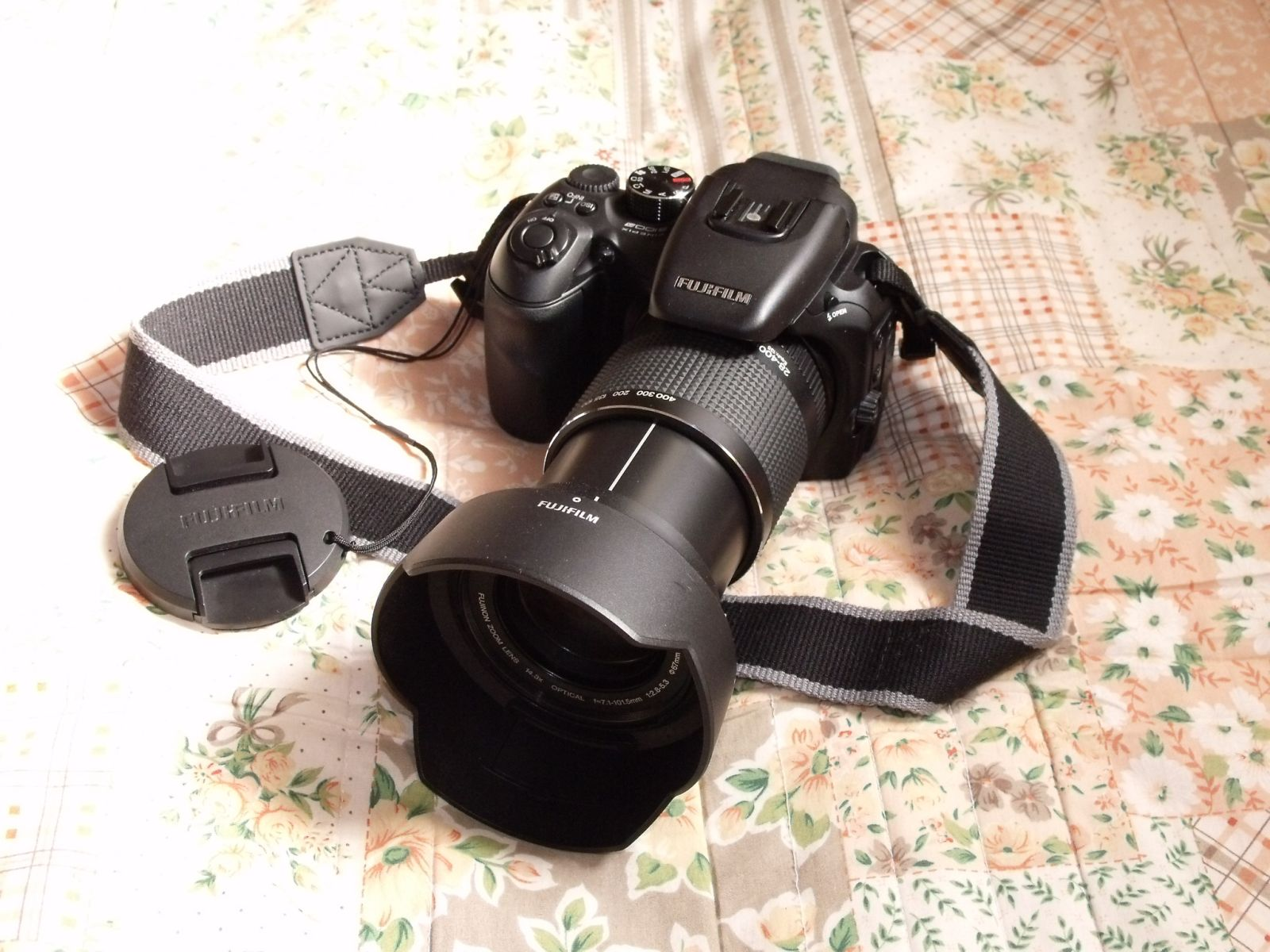
Fujifilm FinePix S100fs

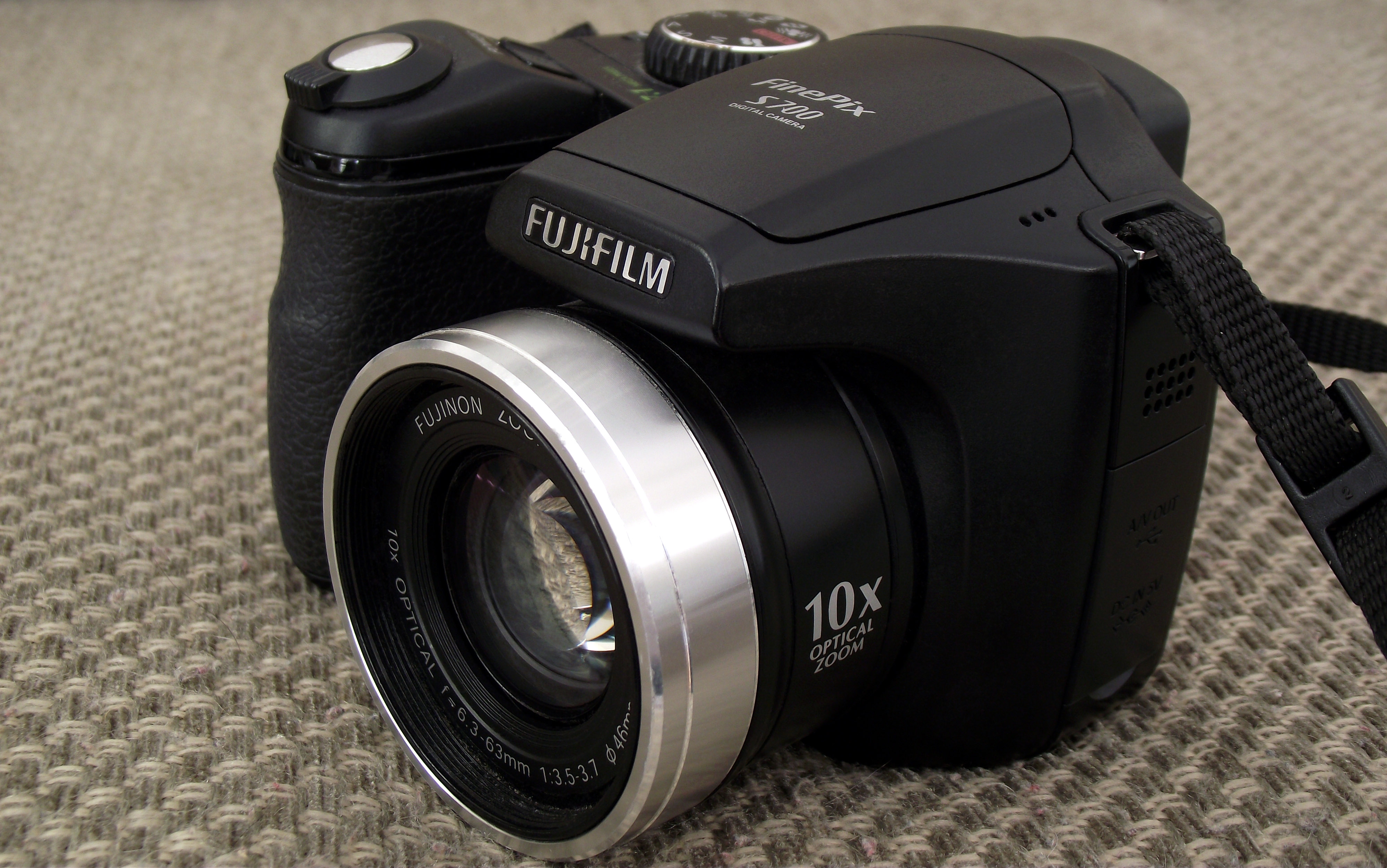
Fujifilm FinePix S700

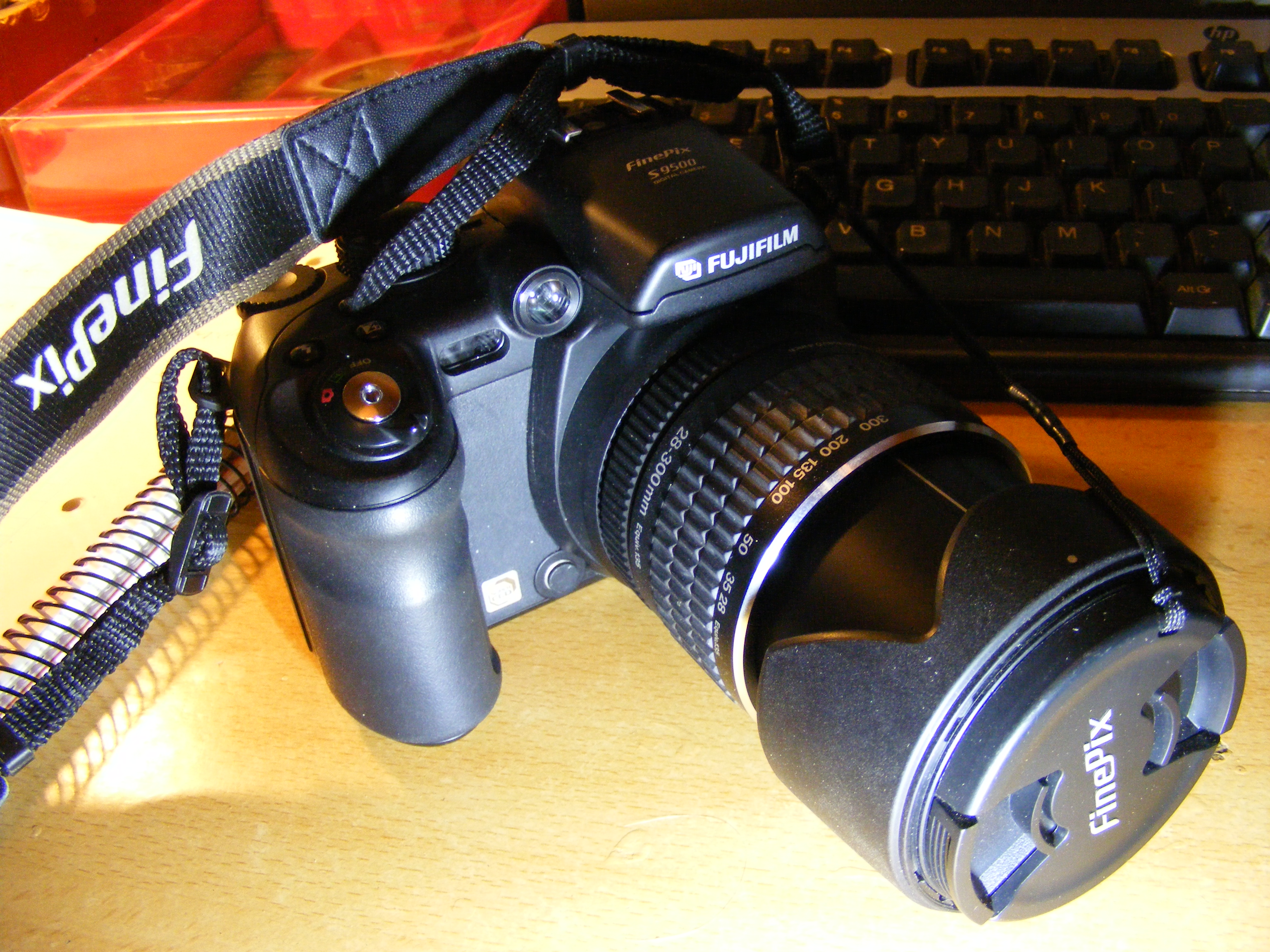
Fujifilm S9500

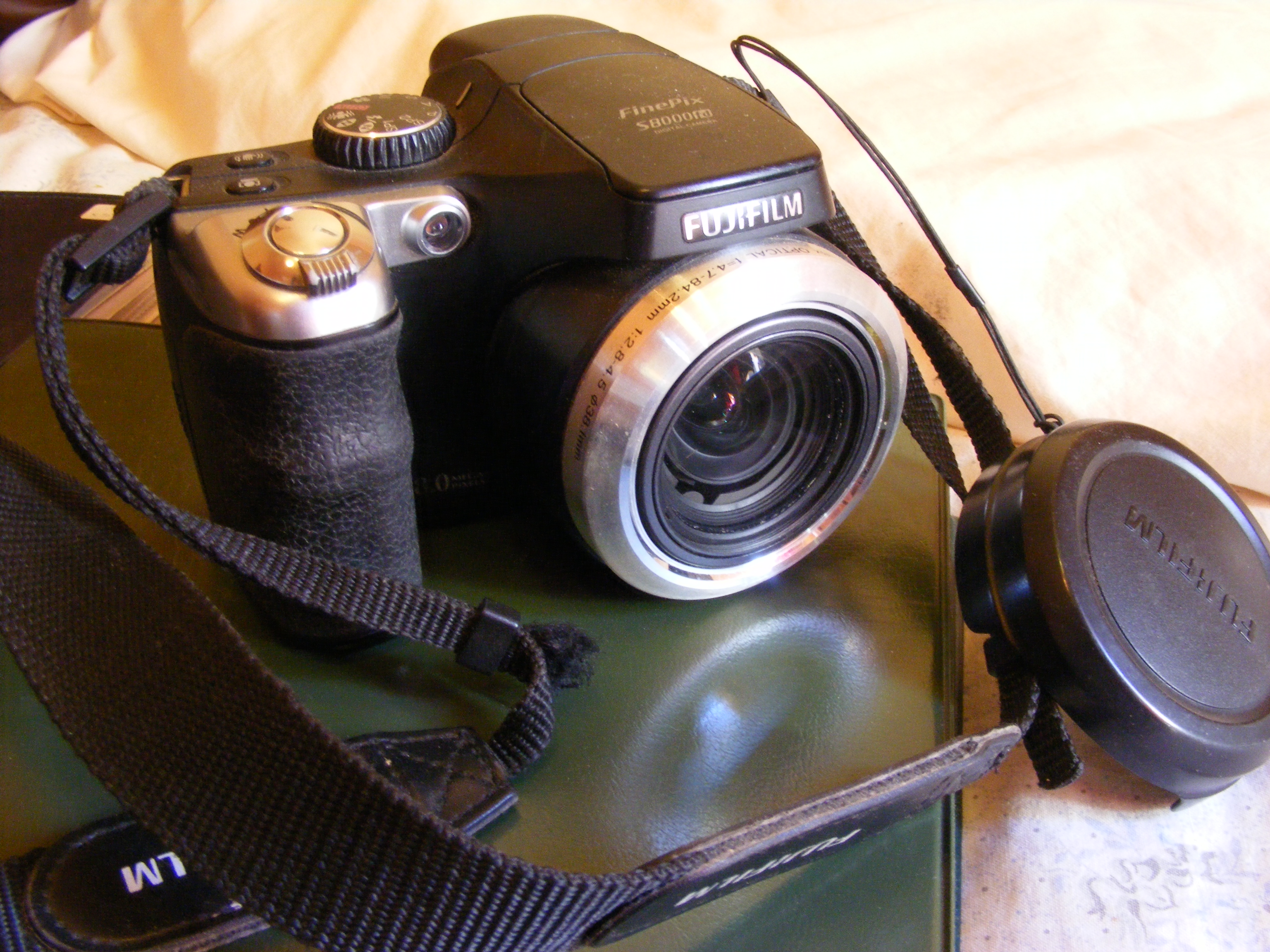
Fujifilm S8000fd

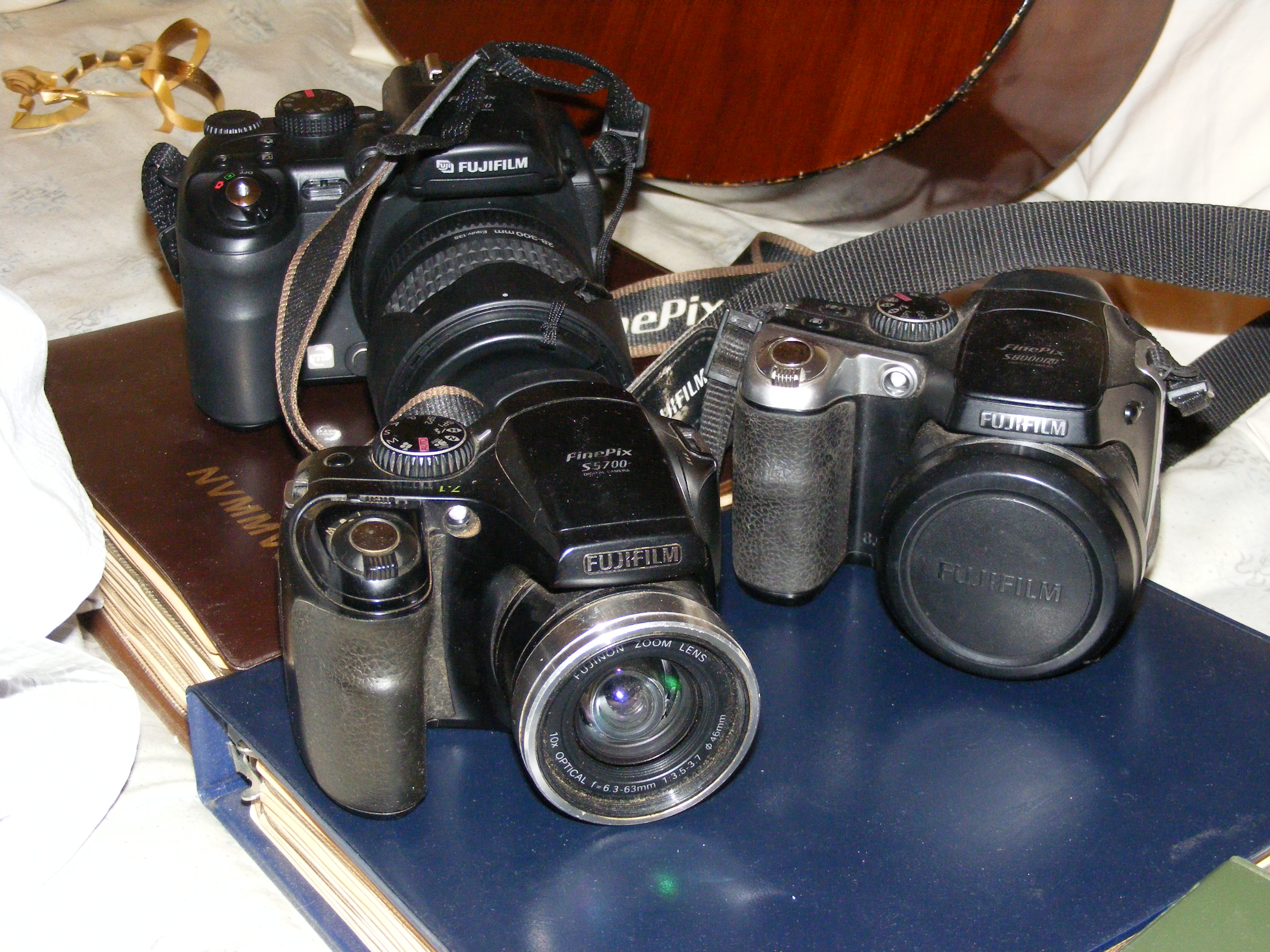
S9500; S8000fd and S5700

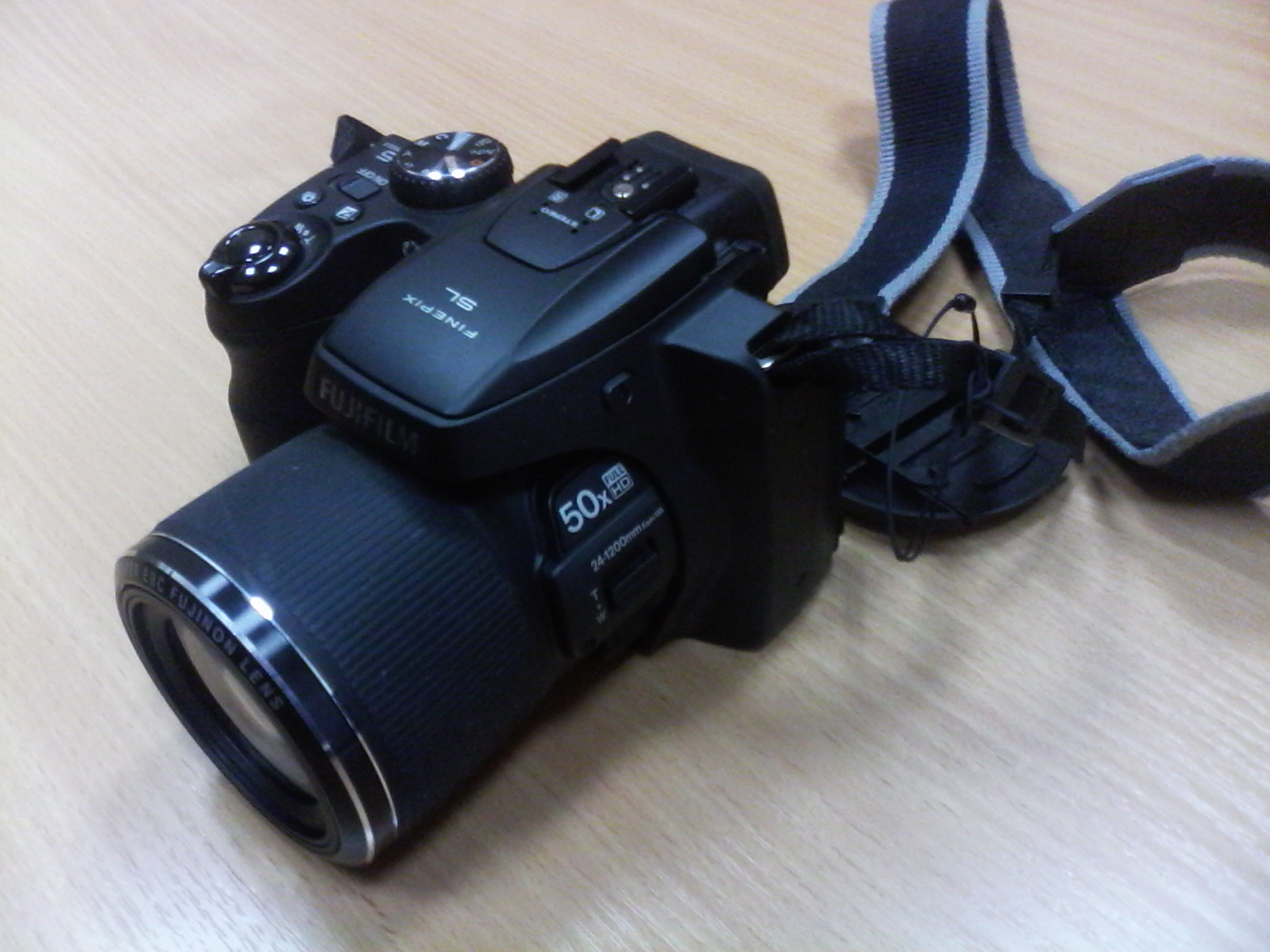
Fujifilm FinePix SL 1000

The Fujifilm FinePix S and HS-series of digital cameras consists of the company's DSLR system and bridge camera models.

== Current models ==
Bridge cameras: (as of 26 November 2016)

- Fujifilm FinePix S9900W / Fujifilm FinePix S9800

== Discontinued models ==
DSLR system:

- FinePix IS Pro
- Fujifilm FinePix S1 Pro (Not to be confused with the FinePix S1 bridge camera of 2014)
- Fujifilm FinePix S2 Pro
- Fujifilm FinePix S3 Pro
- Fujifilm FinePix S5 Pro

Bridge cameras:

- Fujifilm FinePix S2900 series
- Fujifilm FinePix S3200 / Fujifilm FinePix S3280
- Fujifilm FinePix S3300 / Fujifilm FinePix S3380
- Fujifilm FinePix S3400
- Fujifilm FinePix S4000 / Fujifilm FinePix S4080
- Fujifilm FinePix S4200
- Fujifilm FinePix S4300
- Fujifilm FinePix S4500
- Fujifilm FinePix SL240 / Fujifilm FinePix SL300
- Fujifilm FinePix HS series
- Fujifilm FinePix S1000fd
- Fujifilm FinePix S100fs
- Fujifilm FinePix S602 Zoom
- Fujifilm Finepix S1500
- Fujifilm FinePix S1600 / Fujifilm Finepix S1730 / Fujifilm FinePix S1770
- Fujifilm Finepix S1800 / Fujifilm FinePix S1880
- Fujifilm FinePix S2000HD
- Fujifilm FinePix S2500HD / Fujifilm FinePix S2600HD
- Fujifilm FinePix S2550HD
- Fujifilm Finepix S2800HD / Fujifilm FinePix S2900HD
- Fujifilm FinePix S200EXR
- Fujifilm FinePix S3000
- Fujifilm FinePix S3100
- Fujifilm FinePix S3500
- Fujifilm FinePix S5000 Zoom
- Fujifilm FinePix S5100
- Fujifilm FinePix S5200
- Fujifilm FinePix S5500
- Fujifilm FinePix S5800
- Fujifilm FinePix S600 / Fujifilm FinePix S5600
- Fujifilm FinePix S700
- Fujifilm FinePix S5700
- Fujifilm FinePix S800 / Fujifilm Finepix S5800
- Fujifilm FinePix S6000fd / Fujifilm FinePix S6500fd
- Fujifilm FinePix S7000
- Fujifilm FinePix S8000
- Fujifilm FinePix S8100fd
- Fujifilm FinePix S9000
- Fujifilm FinePix S9100
- Fujifilm FinePix S9500
- Fujifilm FinePix HS10 / Fujifilm FinePix HS11
- Fujifilm FinePix S1 (Not to be confused with the FinePix S1 Pro DSLR of 2000)

== See also ==
- Fujifilm FinePix
- Fujifilm cameras
- Fujifilm
