= S6000 =

S6000 may refer to:

- Akai S6000
- FinePix S6000fd, a digital camera by Fujifilm
- Compaq Presario S6000CL, a Compaq Presario desktop computer
