= Canon Epoca =

35 mm bridge camera

Canon Epoca Canon Photura Canon Autoboy Jet
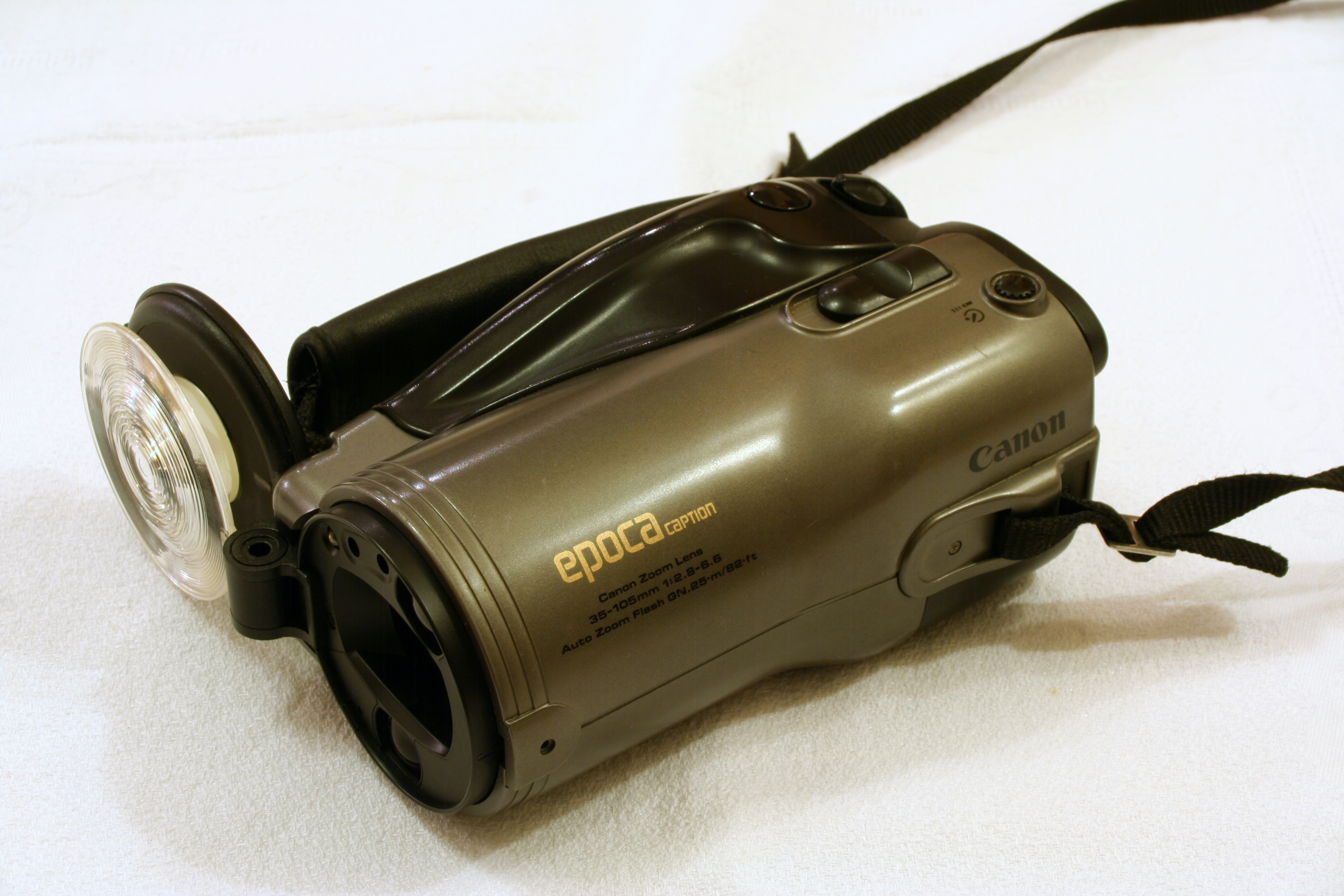

Overview
- Maker: Canon Inc.
- Type: 35 mm bridge
- Released: June 1990

Lens
- Lens mount: Fixed
- Lens: 35–105 mm
- F-numbers: f/3.2 to f/8

Sensor/medium
- Film speed: ISO 25 to 400

Focusing
- Focus: Automatic; 3-point smart AF system with near-infrared beam

Exposure/metering
- Exposure: Automatic
- Exposure metering: EV2.35 to EV18.6 at ISO 100

Flash
- Flash: Built-in

Shutter
- Shutter speed range: Auto mode and flash on mode: EV 10 (f/3.2 at 1/100 sec.) – EV 16 (f/13.2 at 1/350 sec.) at 38 mm EV 12.6 (f/8 at 1/100 sec.) – EV 18.6 (f/34 at 1/350 sec.) at 135 mm Slow speed and flash off mode: EV 2.35 (f/3.2 at 2 sec.) – EV 16 (f/13.2 at 1/350 sec.) at 38 mm EV 5 (f/8 at 2 sec.) – EV 18.6 (f/34 at 1/350 sec.) at 135 mm

General
- Battery: 2CR5
- Dimensions: 100×74×170 mm (3.9×2.9×6.7 in)
- Weight: 700 g (25 oz) with battery
- Made in: Japan
- Replaced by: Canon Epoca 135/Jet 135/Photura 135

The Canon Epoca (also known as the Photura in North America and the Autoboy Jet in Japan) is a 35 mm bridge camera by Canon Inc.

== Overview ==
Introduced in June 1990, the Epoca is known for its unusual design that more resembles a camcorder, as well as its 35 mm to 105 mm zoom lens. In addition, the camera features a flash that is stored behind the lens cover, a low-angle viewfinder on top of its body, and the option to imprint one of five captions on the picture. Both the European and North American releases were offered with or without the quartz date and caption features, with the word "Caption" next to the Epoca/Photura logo to differentiate the two versions. Film is loaded into the chamber inside the bottom panel of the camera, where it is fed through a unique loading system that minimizes light exposure. A remote shutter and a close-up lens attachment with flash diffuser were bundled with the camera or sold separately; the lens attachment enables macro photography from 0.55 m to 0.8 m.

The name Epoca is derived from the word "epoch", implying that the camera's release marked an important point in the history of cameras. The name Photura is a portmanteau of the words "photography" and "Futura", the font used for the camera's logo in the North American market. For the Japanese market, the camera was called the Autoboy Jet, as it resembled a jet engine.

In September 1991, Canon released the Autoboy Jet Canon Williams Racing Version for the 1991 Japanese Grand Prix, with the team logo printed on the hand strap and a pouch in the team's colors. The camera was limited to 5,000 units in Japan only.

The Epoca was replaced by the Epoca 135/Photura 135/Jet 135 in March 1992, with a black body and a more powerful zoom up to 135 mm.

== Gallery ==
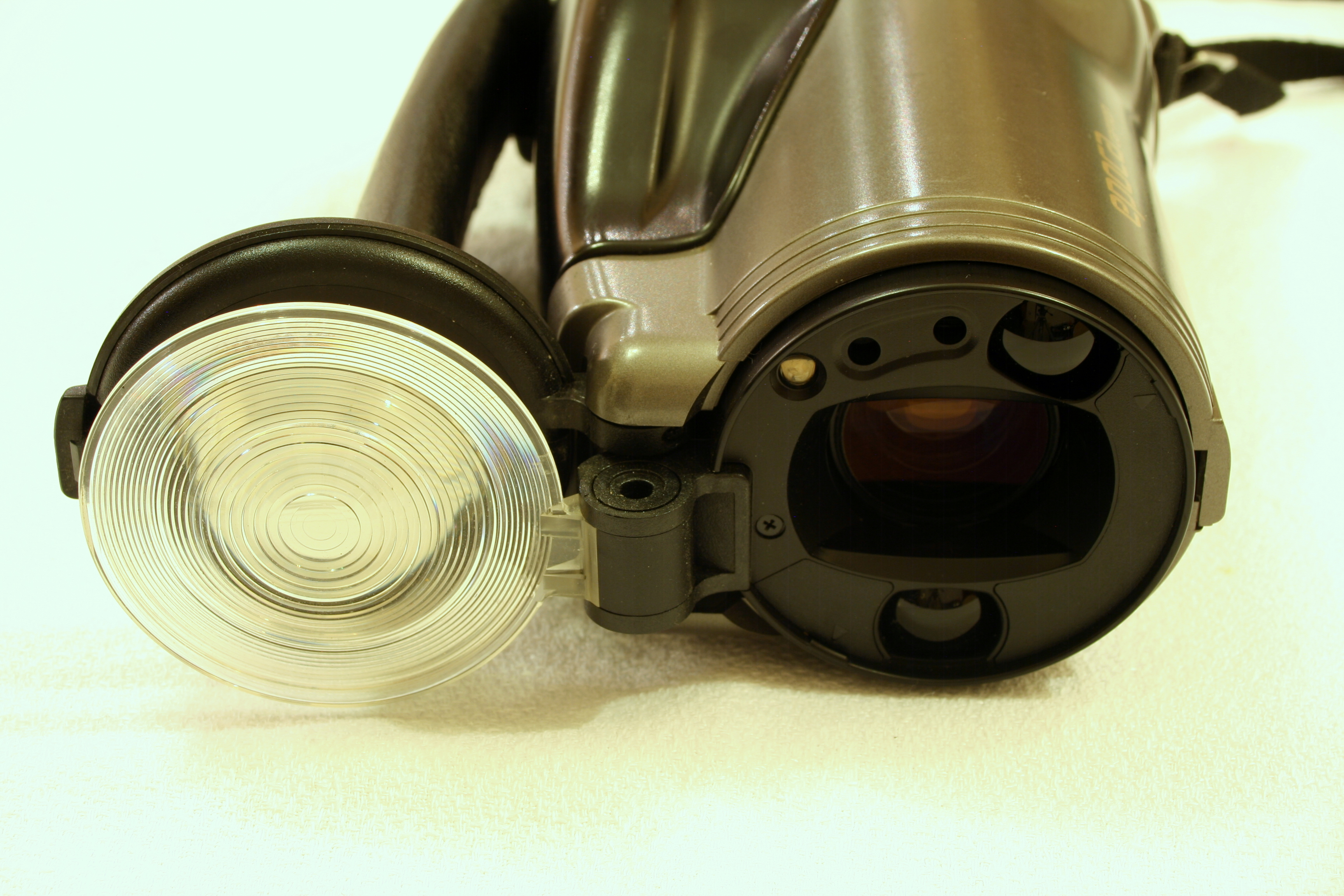
Front view

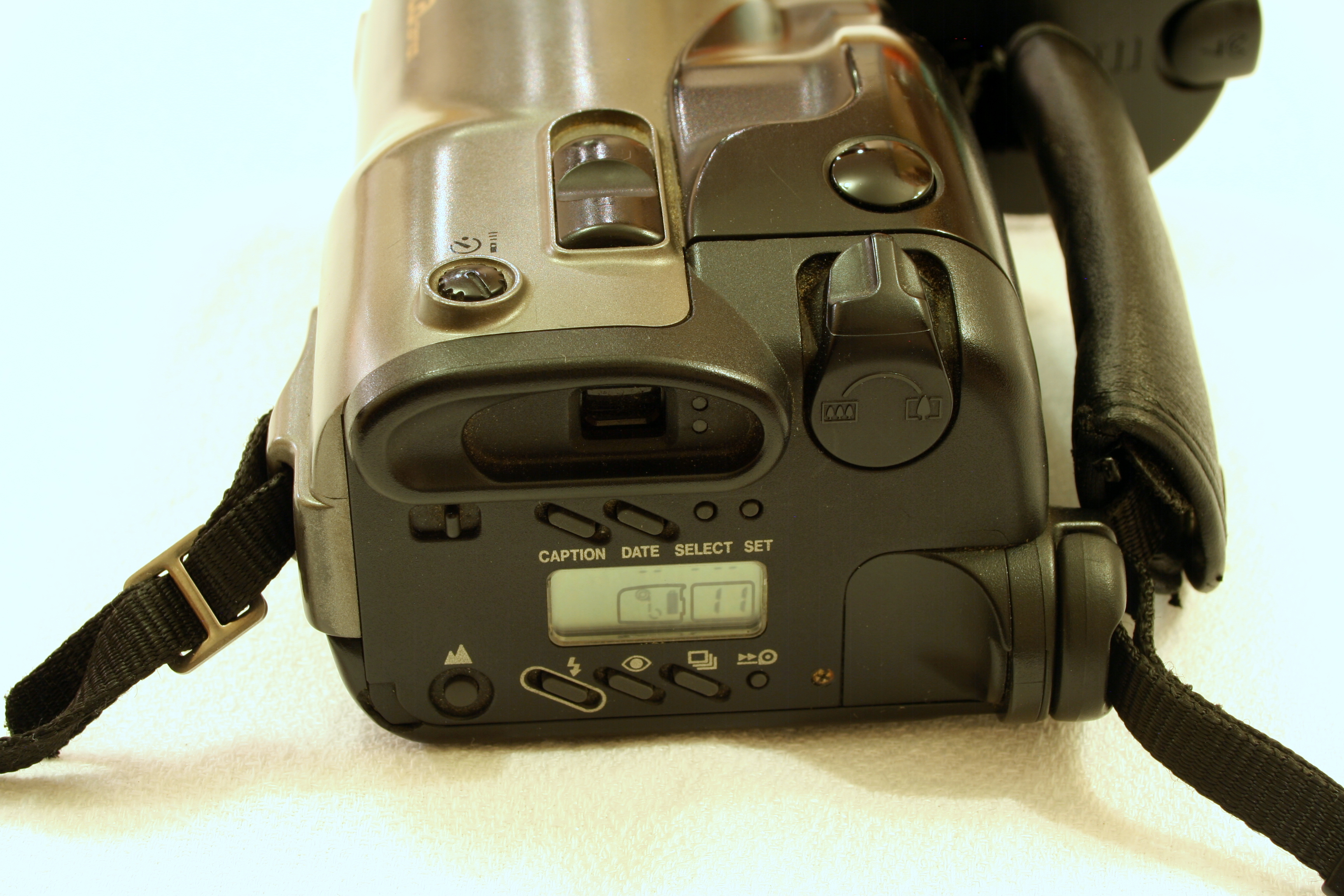
Rear view

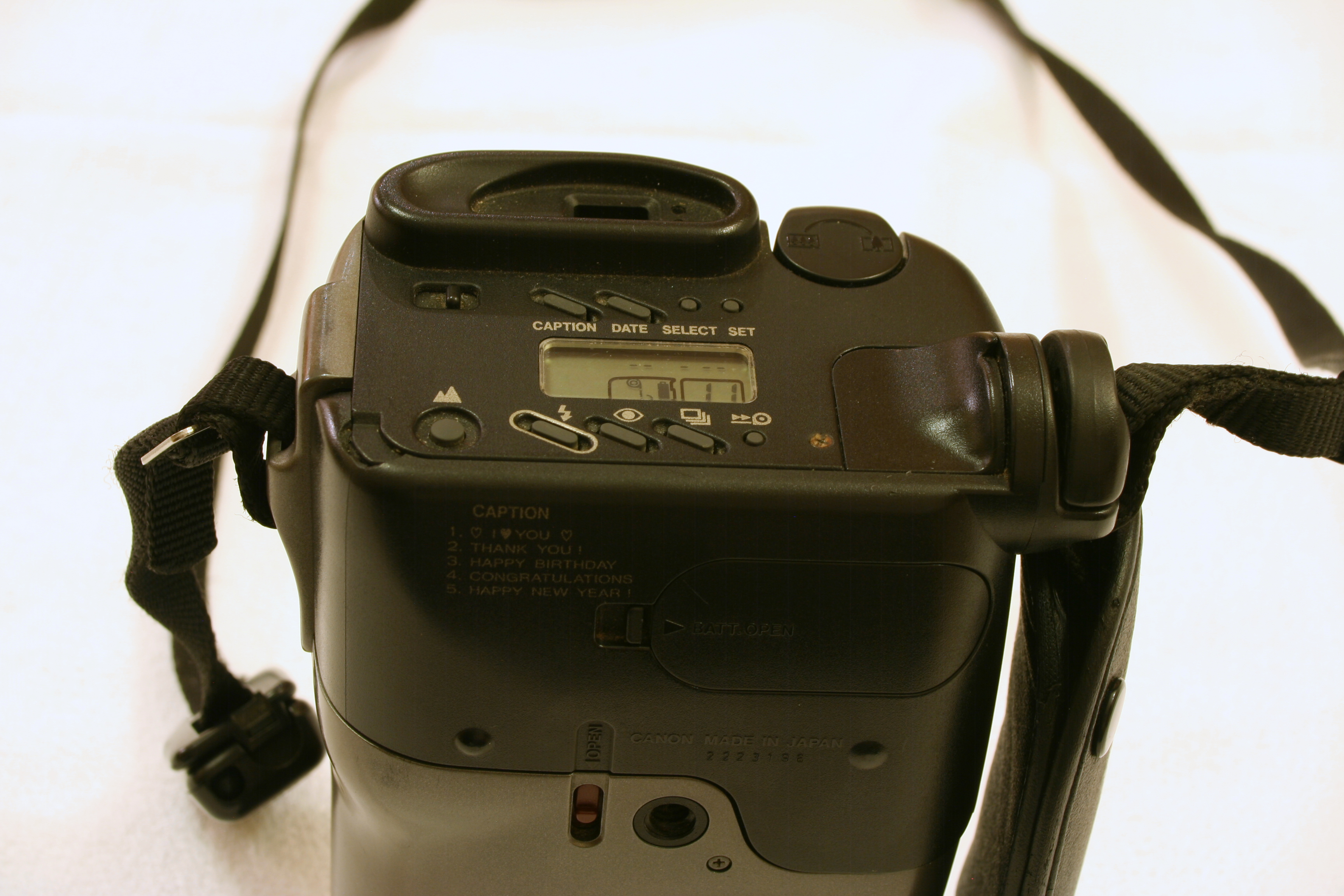
Bottom view
