= Kodak Z612 Zoom Digital Camera =

Kodak Z612 IS
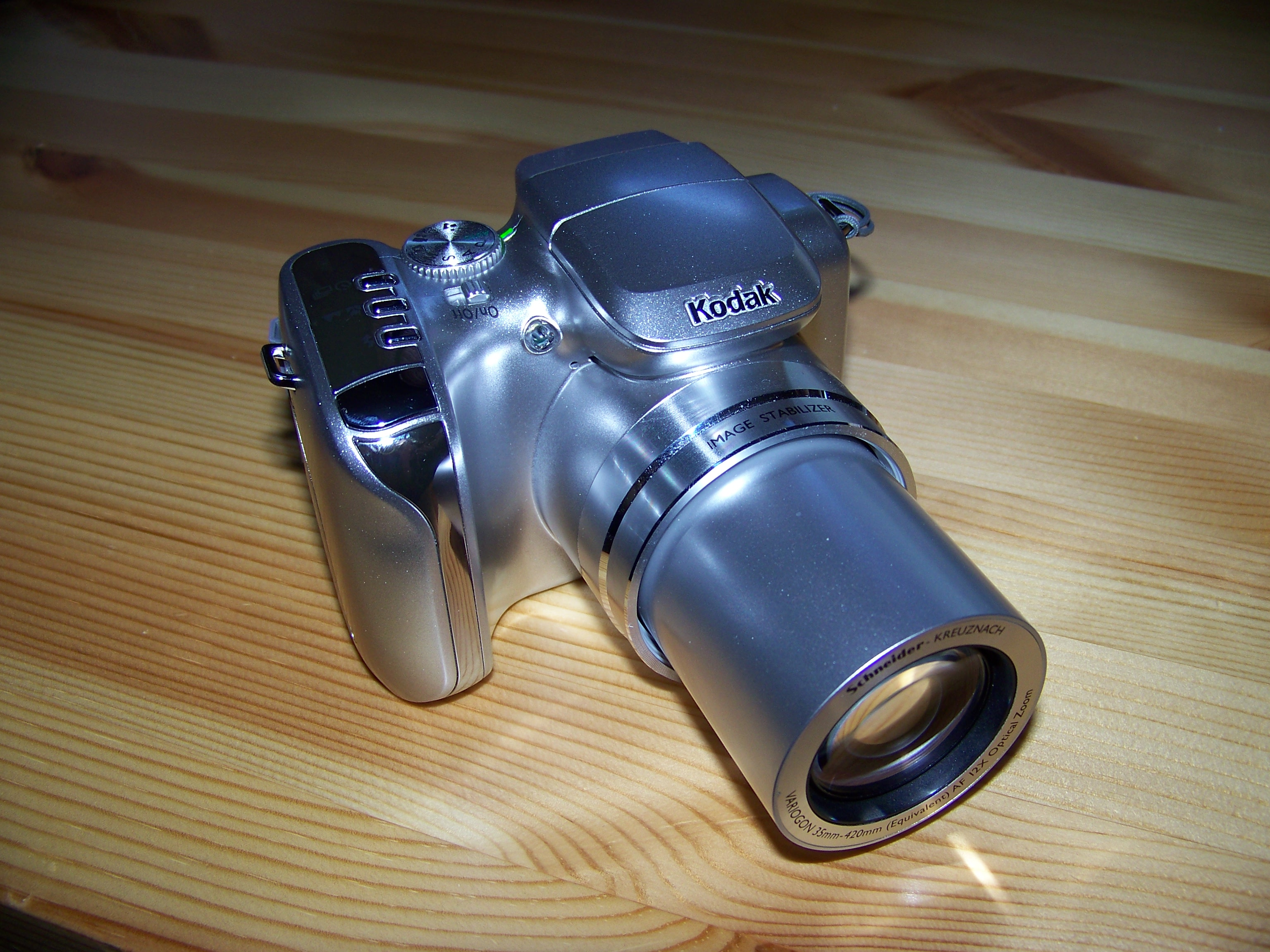

Overview
- Maker: Kodak
- Type: "Bridge" digital camera

Sensor/medium
- Maximum resolution: 6.1 megapixels
- Film speed: ISO 80-400 (800 in 1.1 megapixel mode.)

Viewfinder
- Viewfinder: Electronic & 2.5 " LCD

The Kodak Easyshare Z612 ZOOM is a consumer digital camera. It features a Schneider-Kreuznach VARIOGON 35mm-420mm (35mm equivalent) AF 12x optical zoom lens. One unique feature is its optical image stabilization. It also has an electric viewfinder and a 2.5" LCD screen.

This camera features manual control over the aperture and shutter speed.

It was announced by Kodak in February 2006.
