= Fujifilm FinePix S1600 =

2010 digital camera

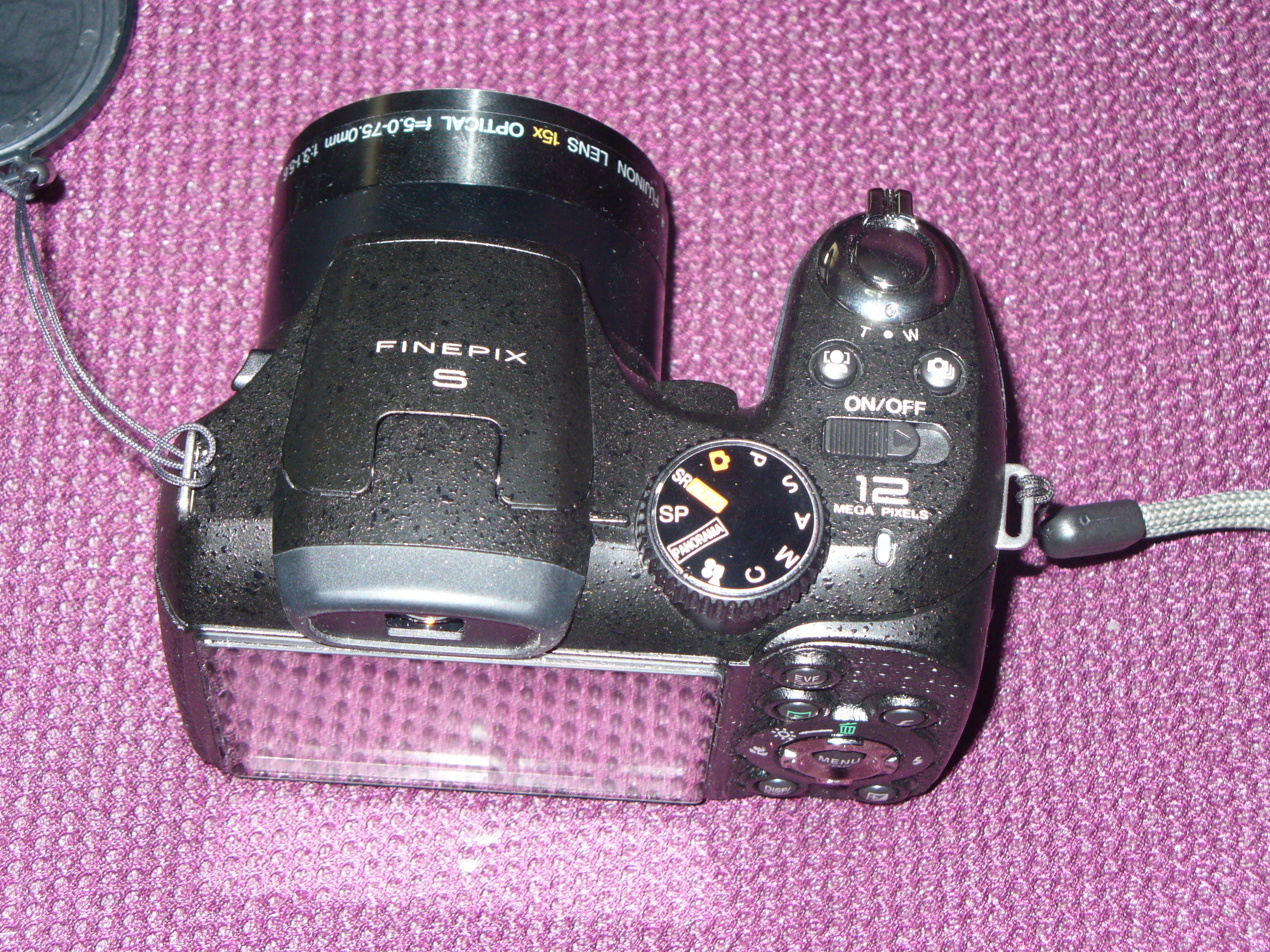

Overview
- Maker: Fujifilm
- Type: Bridge digital camera
- Released: 2010
- Intro price: $199.99

Sensor/medium
- Sensor: 1/2.3-inch
- Sensor type: CCD

Flash
- Flash: Automatic

General
- Video recording: 30 frames per second in 720p
- Weight: 337 g (12 oz) (approx) (by itself)

The Fujifilm FinePix S1600 (or just FinePix S1600) is a discontinued camera made by Fujifilm and was released in 2010 as part of the FinePix S-Series. It has a 12.2 megapixels lens. When recording videos, the FinePix S1600 records in .avi and .wav format in 720p at 30 frames per second and when taking photos, it will use the JPEG format. When released, it had the price of $199.99

== See also ==
- Fujifilm cameras
