= S3000 =

S3000 may refer to:

- Akai S3000XL, a 1996 16-bit professional stereo digital sampler
- EV-S3000, a Hi8 VCR
- FinePix S3000, a 2003 3.2 megapixel digital camera with a 6x optical zoom lens by Fujifilm
