= Fujifilm FinePix S9200 =

Overview
- Maker: Fujifilm
- Type: Bridge camera
- Released: January 6, 2014

Lens
- Lens: 24-1200mm equivalent
- F-numbers: F2.9 - F6.5 at the widest

Sensor/medium
- Sensor type: CMOS
- Sensor size: 6.4 × 4.8mm (½ inch type)
- Maximum resolution: 4608 x 3456 (16 megapixels)
- Recording medium: SD, SDHC, or SDXC memory card
- Storage media: 38 MB

Focusing
- Focus: Autofocus

Flash
- Flash: Built-in flash

Shutter
- Shutter speeds: 1/1700s
- Continuous shooting: 60 frames per second

Viewfinder
- Viewfinder: Yes
- Frame coverage: 100%

Image processing
- White balance: Yes

General
- Video recording: 1920 × 1080 (FullHD) at 60i , 1280 × 720 (720p) at 60p , 640 × 480 (VGA) at 30p ; MPEG-4 or H.264 file format
- LCD screen: 3 inches with 201000 dots, tiltable
- Battery: 4 AA batteries required. (included)

The Fujifilm FinePix S9200 is a bridge camera manufactured by Fujifilm. Featuring a f/2.9-6.5 maximum aperture setting, the lens offers a 24-1200mm optical range that can be boosted to a 100x magnification. Image sharpness is also enhanced by the lens shift image stabilization system that reduces the effects of camera shake, especially at the longer zoom settings. The 1/2.3-inch 16.2 megapixel CMOS sensor in the S9200 is back-side illuminated to ensure the best possible results right up to the maximum ISO sensitivity of 12,800. The S9200 can start up in one second, autofocus in as little as 0.3 seconds and then be ready to take another shot in just 0.5 second. It can also record movies in Full HD (1920 x 1080) at up to 60 frames-per-second. Six Advanced Filter functions that allow users to add creative effects to movies, plus there's a 480 frames-per-second slow motion mode and a dedicated movie record button. 10 Advanced filters are available for still pictures too.

== Reviews ==
Initial reviews on the S9200 have been favourable, with users citing the 50x zoom lens as one of the camera's key benefits.

This view was also echoed by a wildlife and PhotographyBlog who tried the camera out in the field.

== Notes and references ==
- http://www.dpreview.com/products/fujifilm/compacts/fujifilm_s9200/specifications
