= Fujifilm FinePix S5200 =

Fujifilm Finepix S5200
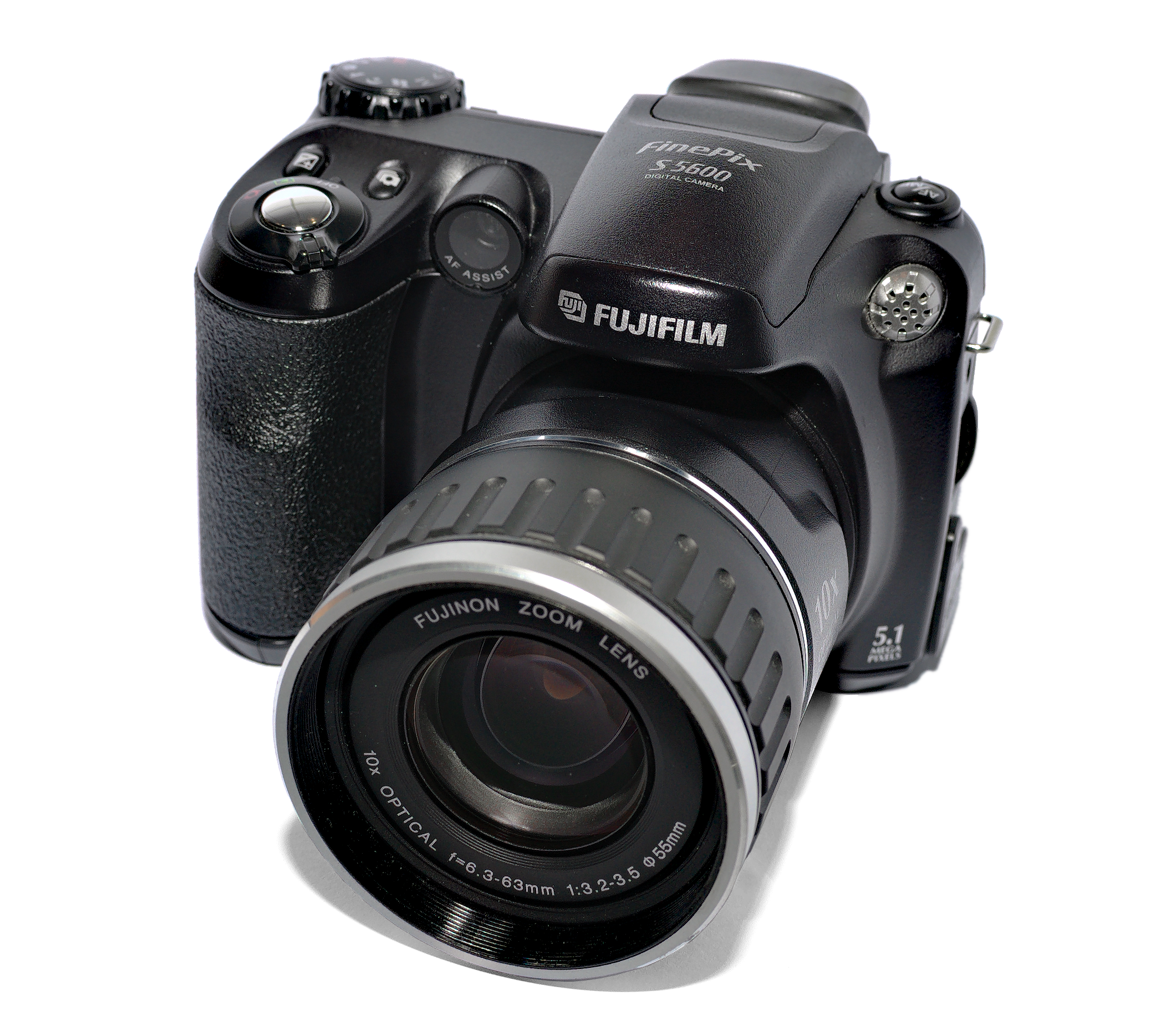

Overview
- Maker: Fujifilm Corporation
- Type: Bridge digital camera

Lens
- Lens: Fixed

Sensor/medium
- Sensor: 1/2.5-inch Super CCD
- Maximum resolution: 2592x1944 (5.1 megapixels)
- Film speed: 64-1600
- Storage media: xD-Picture Card

Focusing
- Focus modes: Single shot, continuous 3-shot, bracketing, manual
- Focus areas: 5 points, cross pattern

Exposure/metering
- Exposure modes: Automatic, shutter-priority, aperture priority, program, manual
- Metering modes: Matrix, Center Area, C/Wgt Average

Flash
- Flash: pop-up

Shutter
- Shutter: electronic focal-plane
- Shutter speed range: 15 s to 1/2000 s

Viewfinder
- Viewfinder: Electronic

Image processing
- White balance: 6 presets, auto, custom

General
- LCD screen: 1.8-inch, 118,000 pixels
- Battery: 4 AA

The Fujifilm FinePix S5200 (known in Europe as S5600) is a bridge digital camera made by Fujifilm. The camera's original MSRP was US$285.

The camera was introduced by Fuji on July 28, 2005. It was awarded the title of best zoom camera for 2006/2007 by the EISA.

The Fujifilm S5200 was primarily targeted at the power-user photographers in Australia, Europe and the United States. It was superseded by the S5700.

The camera's features were fairly impressive at launch including a 10x optical zoom, a 5.1-megapixel CCD imaging sensor as well as a host of manual settings.

The manual settings which the s5200 featured allow much control over the image, such settings like TTL metering, ISO, flash, Macro, White Balance and Red Eye Reduction could be manipulated.

== Features ==
- Fujinon 10x optical zoom lens, F3.2-F3.5, 38-380 mm
- Focal length f=6.3 mm-63 mm, equivalent to 35 mm film's 38 mm-380 mm
- Aperture F3.2 to F8, 9 steps, 1/3 EV steps
- Shutter lag of 0.015 of a second with pre-set focus
- Video recording (VGA or QVGA)
- Continuous AF and electronic manual focusing
- 2 frames per second for up to 3 shots
- AF assist lamp
- Fujichrome film simulation
