= Fujifilm FinePix S2000HD =

2008 digital camera

Fujifilm S2000HD
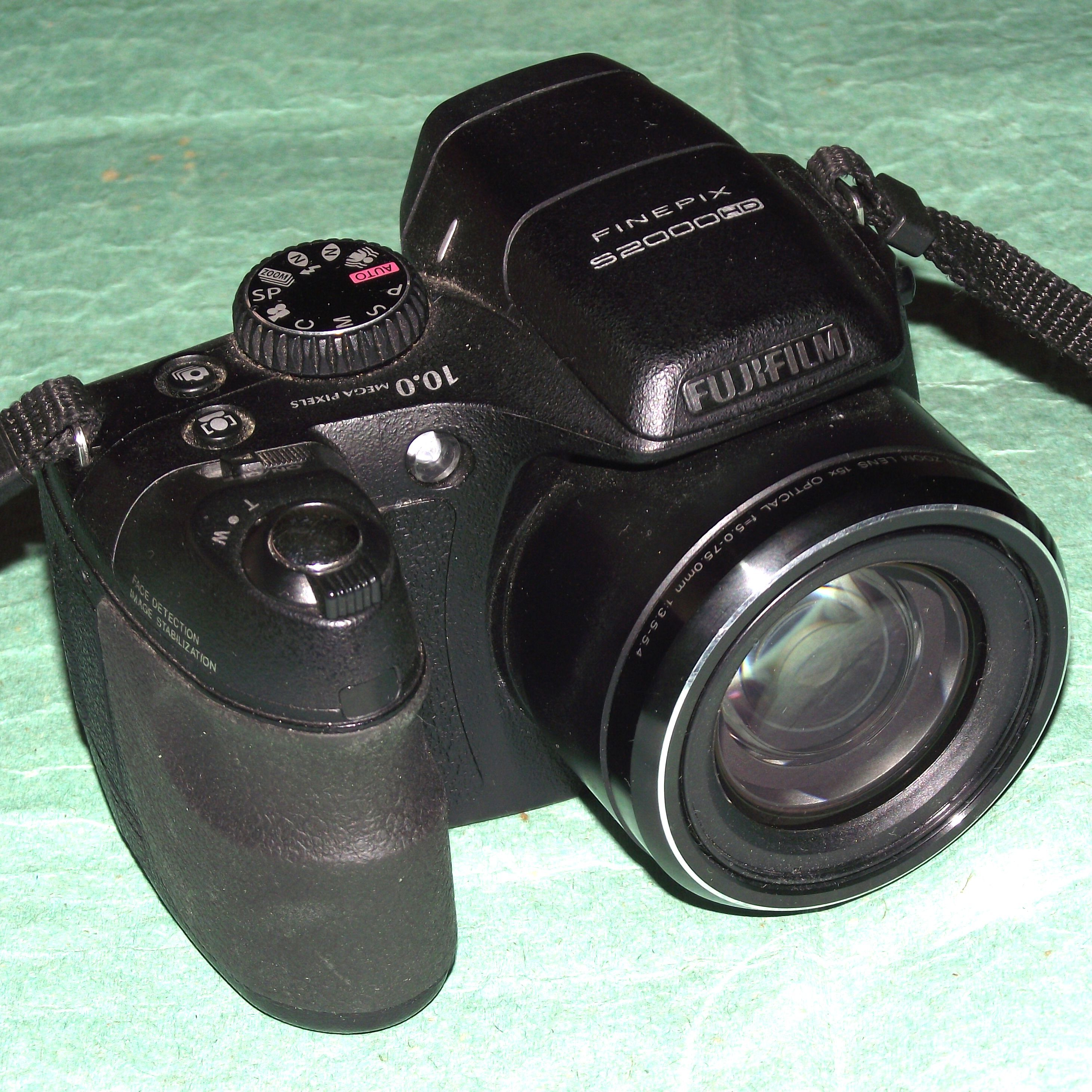

Overview
- Maker: Fujifilm Corporation
- Type: Point-and-shoot

Lens
- Lens: Fujinon 15x Optical zoom, F 3.5 (Wide, F 5. (Telephoto)

Sensor/medium
- Sensor: CCD, 1/2.3 inch CCD
- Maximum resolution: 3648 × 2736
- Storage media: internal 55Mb + SD/SDHC card

Focusing
- Focus areas: Auto Focus(Area, Multi, Center), Continuous AF, Manual Focus, AF Assist Illuminator

Exposure/metering
- Exposure metering: 256-segment matrix, center-weighted, spot, spot AF

Shutter
- Shutter speed range: 1/4 sec to 1/1000 sec (auto mode), 4 sec to 1/1000 sec
- Continuous shooting: 13.5 frame/s

Viewfinder
- Viewfinder: electronic, LCD monitor

General
- LCD screen: 2.7", 230000 dots (Approximate) TFT color LCD monitor, 97% coverage, 60 frame/s
- Battery: 4x AA size batteries (Alkaline included), Ni-MH sold separately
- Weight: 386g(13.0 oz) without battery, memory card and accessories)

The Fujifilm FinePix S2000HD is a discontinued 2008 digital camera from Fujifilm's FinePix S-series. It has a 10-megapixel CCD sensor. It is the earliest Fujifilm camera fully compatible with high-definition video.

== Reception ==
In a review by CNET, the S2000HD received 6.6 points. This rating was mainly justified because of slow performance, visible image noise even at low ISO sensitivities and a mediocre electronic viewfinder. Contrarily, the camera's "compact, comfortable design" and comparatively low price were listed as positives.
