= Fujifilm FinePix S9500 =

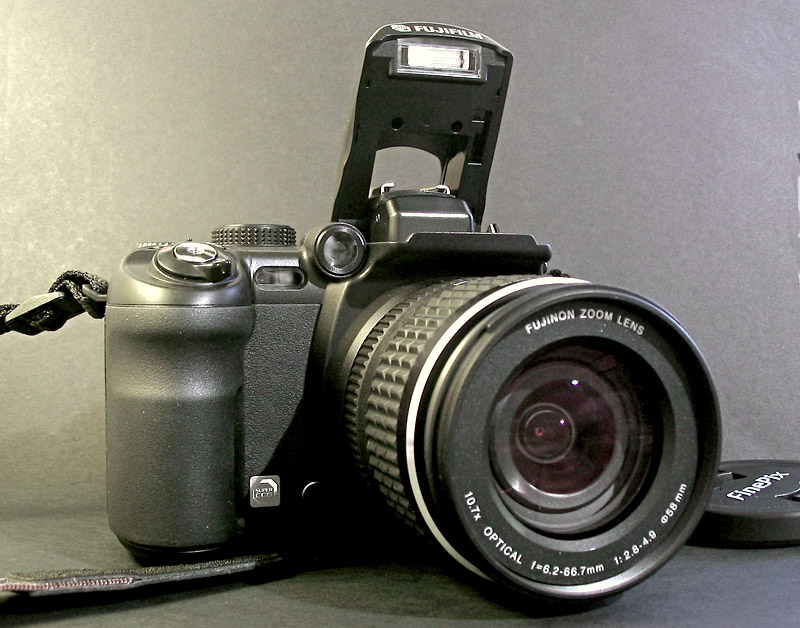

Overview
- Maker: Fujifilm Corporation
- Type: Bridge digital camera

Lens
- Lens: Fixed 28 mm - 300 mm equiv. (10.7x zoom ratio)

Sensor/medium
- Sensor: 1/1.6" CCD
- Maximum resolution: 9.0 megapixels
- Film speed: Auto / 80 / 100 / 200 / 400 / 800 / 1600
- Storage media: xD Picture Card Compact Flash

Exposure/metering
- Exposure modes: Program AE, Aperture Priority AE, Shutter Priority AE, Manual, Program Shift (P mode)

Shutter
- Shutter speed range: 30 – 1/4,000 sec.

Viewfinder
- Viewfinder: Electronic viewfinder

Fujifilm FinePix S9500 or FinePix S9000 is a bridge digital camera released by Fujifilm in 2005. It is a member of the Fujifilm FinePix family and has been superseded by the Fujifilm FinePix S100fs. It has a number of advanced prosumer features, like having wide-angle ability (28 mm equivalent on a 35 mm camera), full range of manual settings, mechanical zoom ring, high ISO-sensitivities, and some of the features of Live-Preview Digital cameras (LPDs) like movie mode, movable LCD panel, and macro mode.

== Main features ==
- RAW option
- Movie mode (up to 60 fps)
- 21.4x total zoom (10.7x optical, 2.0x digital)
- Macro mode starting from 1 cm
- Hot shoe for external flash
- The LCD screen can be tilted up to an angle of 45° and 90° and down to 45°.
- Facility to use a cable release.
