= Fujifilm FinePix S7000 =

Fujifilm Finepix S7000
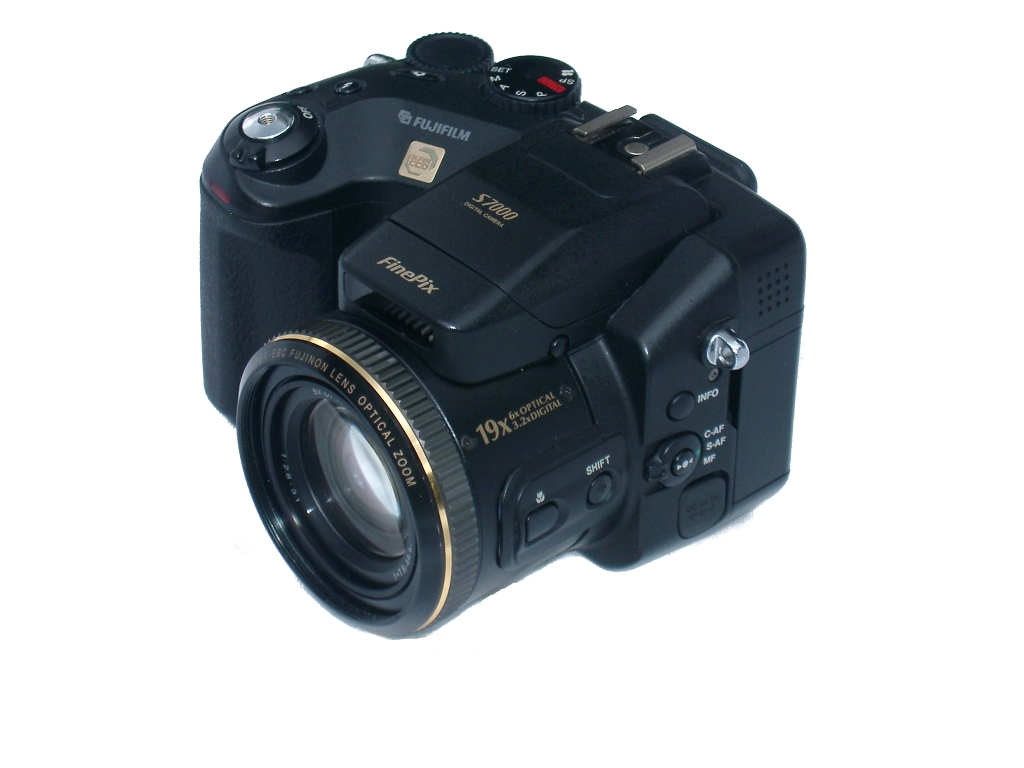
- FinePix S7000

Overview
- Maker: Fujifilm Holdings Corporation
- Type: Bridge digital camera

Lens
- Lens: non-interchangeable, Zoom 35-210 eq.

Sensor/medium
- Sensor: 1/1.7" Super CCD HR
- Maximum resolution: 2848x2136 (6.1 megapixels)
- Film speed: 160-800
- Storage media: xD-Picture Card, Microdrive

Exposure/metering
- Exposure modes: Auto, Portrait, Landscape, Sports, Night, Programmed AE, Aperture Priority AE, Shutter Priority AE, Manual

Flash
- Flash: pop-up, hot-shoe

Shutter
- Shutter: electronic focal-plane
- Shutter speed range: 15s. to 1/10000s.

Viewfinder
- Viewfinder: Electronic

Image processing
- White balance: 6 presets, auto, custom

General
- LCD screen: 1.8-inch, 118,000 pixels
- Battery: 4 AA

The FinePix S7000 is a 6.3 megapixel digital camera manufactured by Fujifilm. It was announced in July 2003, and has since been discontinued. It features 6x optical zoom.

The S7000 can take still images in CCD-RAW or JPEG Exif Ver 2.2 up to 4,048 x 3,040 pixels using a 1/1.7-inch-type CCD sensor. This 12.3 megapixel resolution is interpolated from the approximately 6 million photodiodes on the Fujifilm 4th generation Super CCD HR sensor. While still a Bayer filter CCD with 3 million green, 1.5 million each red and blue photodiodes, the SuperCCD HR array is tilted 45 degrees. Fujifilm states that its larger equilateral octagonal photodiodes, tilted arrangement, and use of the photoelectric sensing capability of CCD vertical transfer paths enable 12 million output pixels.

It has dual memory slots. The first supports xD-Picture Card, the other supports Compact Flash Type II Microdrives up to 2GB. Some Compact Flash memory cards will not work.

Fujifilm made two conversion lens kits available, a 1.50x tele conversion lens and a 0.79x wide-angle conversion lens, both of which come with a 55 mm thread diameter adapter extension tube.
