= Fujifilm FinePix S5800 =

Fujifilm FinePix S5800/S800
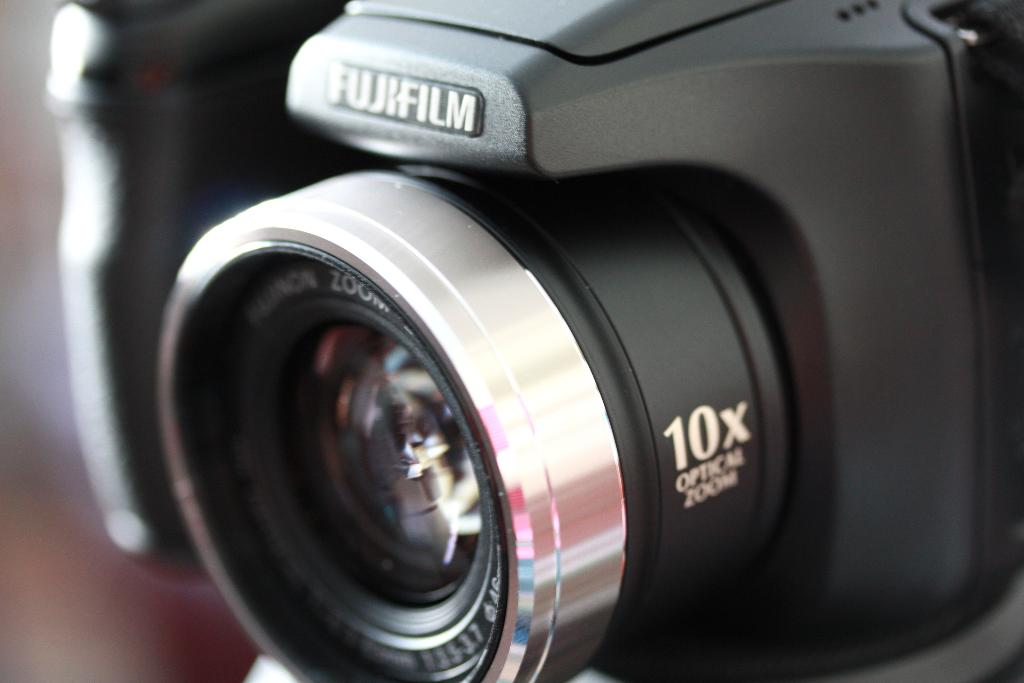
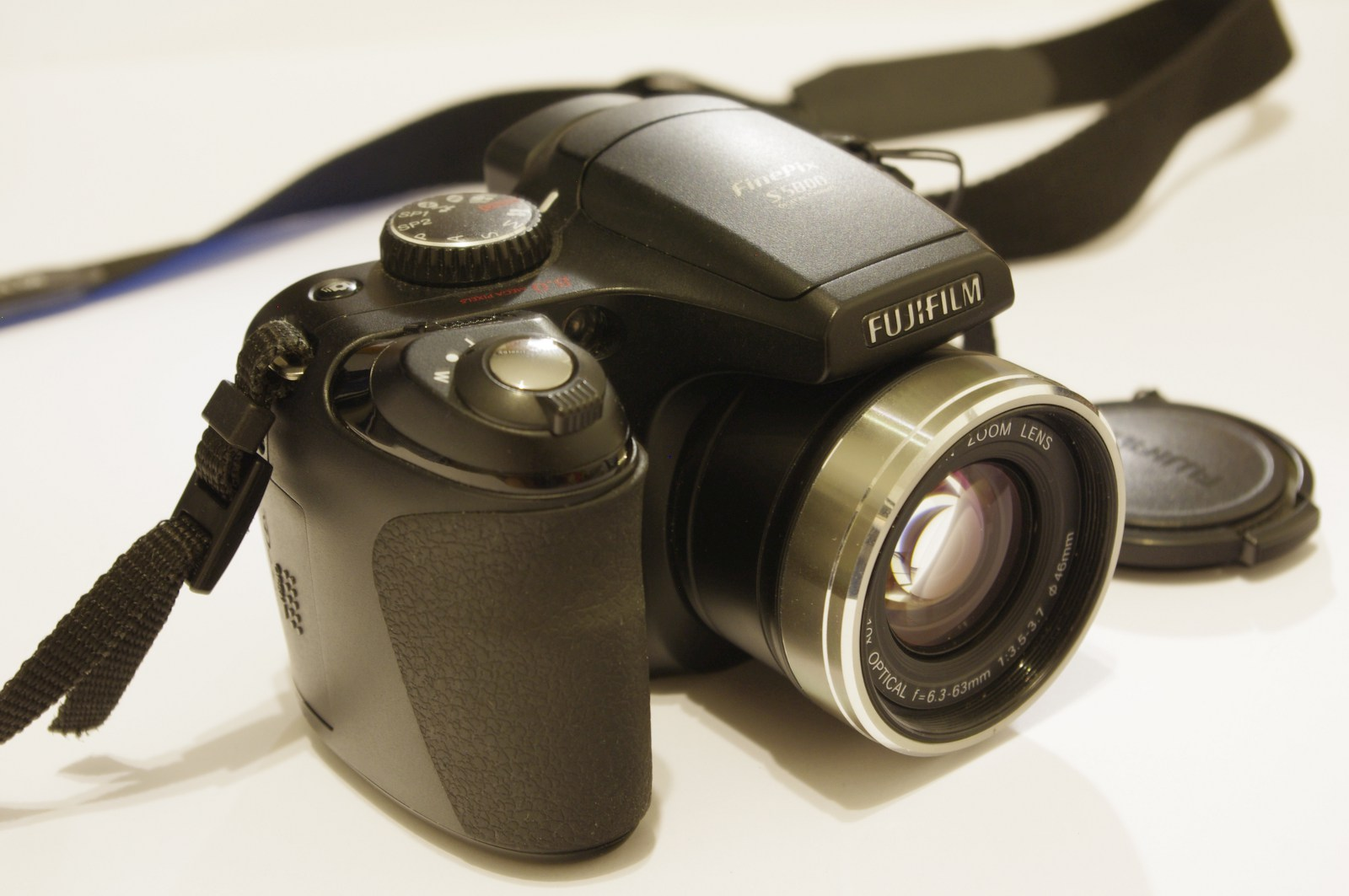

Overview
- Type: 'Bridge' Camera

Lens
- Lens: Fixed (10× optical zoom)

Sensor/medium
- Maximum resolution: 8.0 Megapixels
- Film speed: 64–1600
- Storage media: SD or xD card

Focusing
- Focus bracketing: Yes

Exposure/metering
- Exposure modes: Auto, Picture Stabilization, Natural Light, Natural Light & Flash, Scene Positions 1 & 2, Program AE, Aperture Priority AE, Shutter Priority AE, Manual & Movie.

Flash
- Flash: Built-in, pop-up (electronic)
- Flash bracketing: Yes

Shutter
- Shutter speed range: 1/1000 sec to 4 sec

Viewfinder
- Viewfinder: Electronic

General
- LCD screen: 2.5 inches, 230,000 pixels, 97% coverage.
- Battery: 4× AA batteries

Fujifilm FinePix S5800 (or FinePix S800 in some regions) is a digital camera released by Fujifilm in 2007 and intended for the enthusiastic amateur. It features eight megapixels and 480p video.
