= Fujifilm FinePix S8000 =

Digital camera model

The Fujifilm FinePix S8000 is a digital camera manufactured by Fujifilm. It is part of their FinePix S-series range. It is a compact camera loosely resembling a digital SLR camera. It is Fujifilm's first superzoom camera with optical image stabilization, and also features an 18x zoom lens.

== Specification ==
Below is the specification for the Fujifilm FinePix S8000

Category	Specification
Effective Pixels	8.3 Million (8.3 Megapixels)
Zoom	Optical: 18x
CCD sensor	1/ 2.35-inch CCD
Lens	Fujinon 18 X Optical zoom lens, F2.8 – F4.5
Lens focal length	f=4.7mm – 84.2 mm, (27– 486 mm 35mm equivalent)
ISO Sensitivity	Auto / Auto (1600)/ Auto(800)/ Auto(400)/ Equivalent to 64/100/200/400/ 800/1600/3200/6400 (Standard Output Sensitivity)
Memory Card compatibility	xD-Picture Card, SD memory card and SDHC memory card
Batteries	4 x AA
