= Fujifilm FinePix S602 Zoom =

Digital compact camera

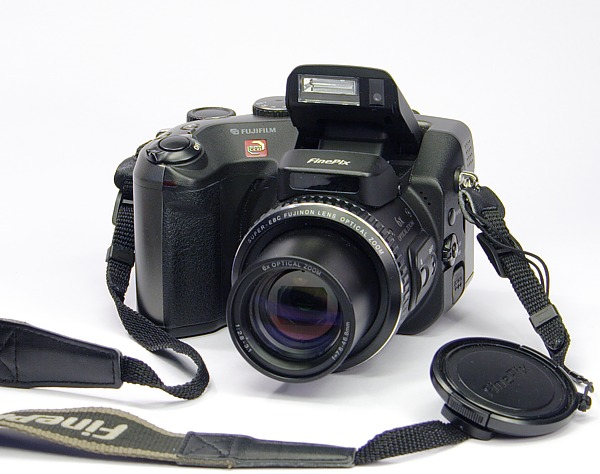
Fujifilm FinePix S602 Zoom camera

The Fujifilm FinePix S602 Zoom is a digital camera manufactured by Fujifilm as part of their FinePix S-series range. It is a compact camera, although it does resemble a digital SLR. It was first released in 2002 and has since been discontinued.

== Specifications ==
Specifications for the camera are:

Category	Specification
Effective pixels	3.1 million (3.1 megapixel)
Zoom	6× (optical), 4.4× (digital)
Sensor	1/1.7″ Fujifilm SuperCCD III
Lens	Super EBC Fujinon 6× zoom (aspherical)
Lens focal length	35–210 mm (35 mm camera equivalent)
ISO sensitivity	160, 200, 400, 800, 1600 (increased at 1280 × 960)
Memory card compatibility	SmartMedia (3.3V), CompactFlash type I or II
Batteries	4× AA (alkaline or Ni-MH)
