= Fujifilm FinePix S1800 =

2010 digital camera

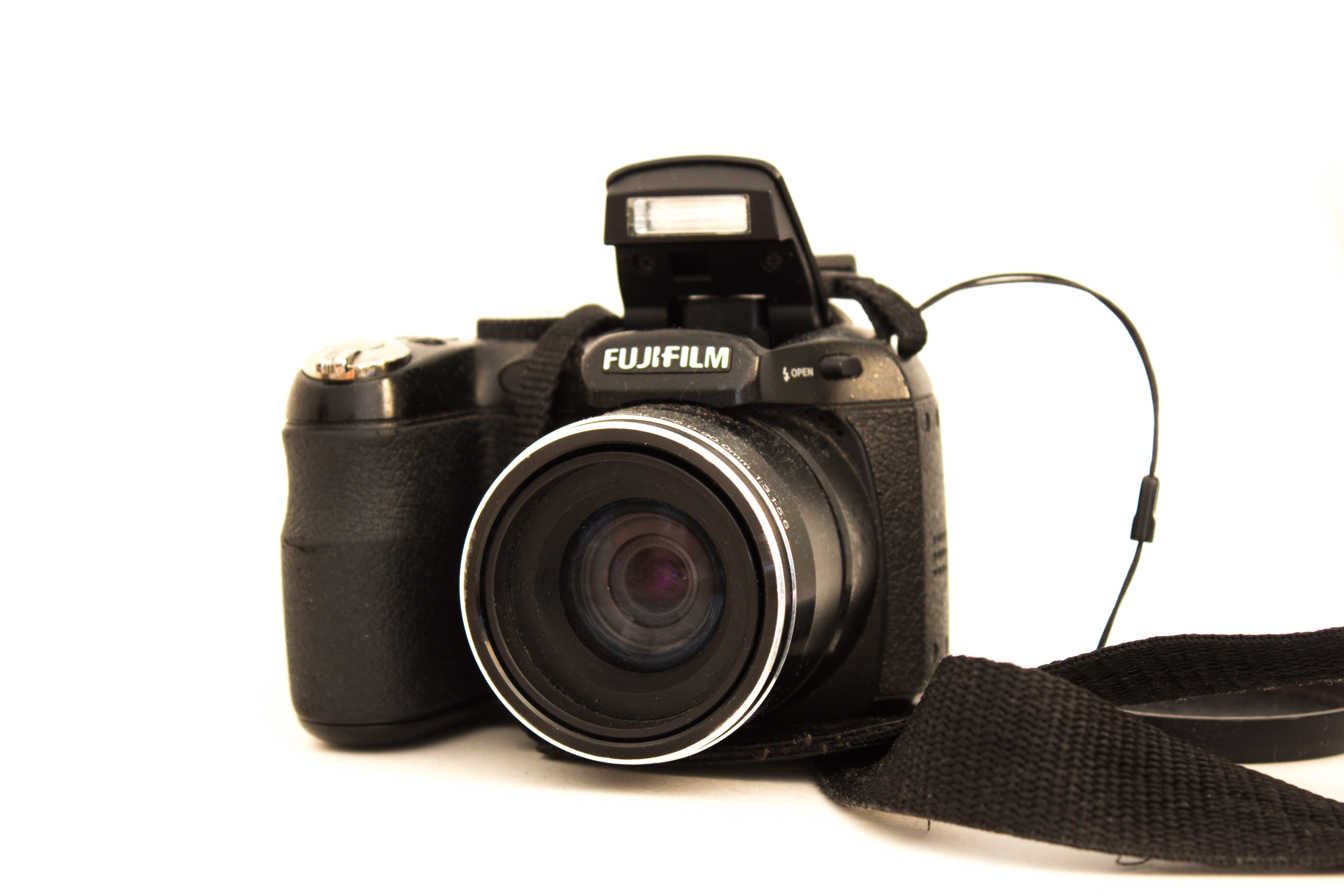

Overview
- Maker: Fujifilm Holdings Corporation
- Type: Bridge

Lens
- Lens: Fujinon 18x Optical zoom (5mm-90mm), F 3.1 (Wide) - F5.6 (Telephoto)

Sensor/medium
- Sensor: CCD, 1/2.3" CCD
- Maximum resolution: 4000 × 3000 (12 megapixels)
- Storage media: Internal memory (Approx. 23MB) + SD memory card/SDHC memory card

Focusing
- Focus areas: Single AF, Continuous AF

Exposure/metering
- Exposure metering: Programmed AE, Shutter Priority AE, Aperture Priority AE, Manual

Shutter
- Shutter speed range: 8 sec. to 1/2000 sec.
- Continuous shooting: Up to 1.3fps

Viewfinder
- Viewfinder: EVF, LCD monitor

General
- LCD screen: 3.0 in (76 mm), Approx. 230,000 dots, color LCD monitor, up to 60fps
- Battery: 4x AA size batteries (Alkaline included), Ni-MH sold separately.
- Weight: Approx. 337 g (11.9 oz) (excluding accessories and batteries etc.)

The Fujifilm FinePix S1800 is a digital camera manufactured by Fujifilm as part of their FinePix range. It is a superzoom camera capable of capturing 12 megapixel stills and HD video. The S1800 is part of FujiFilm's bridge camera series which bridges the gap between compact and SLR cameras.
