= Fujifilm FinePix S6500fd =

Digital camera model

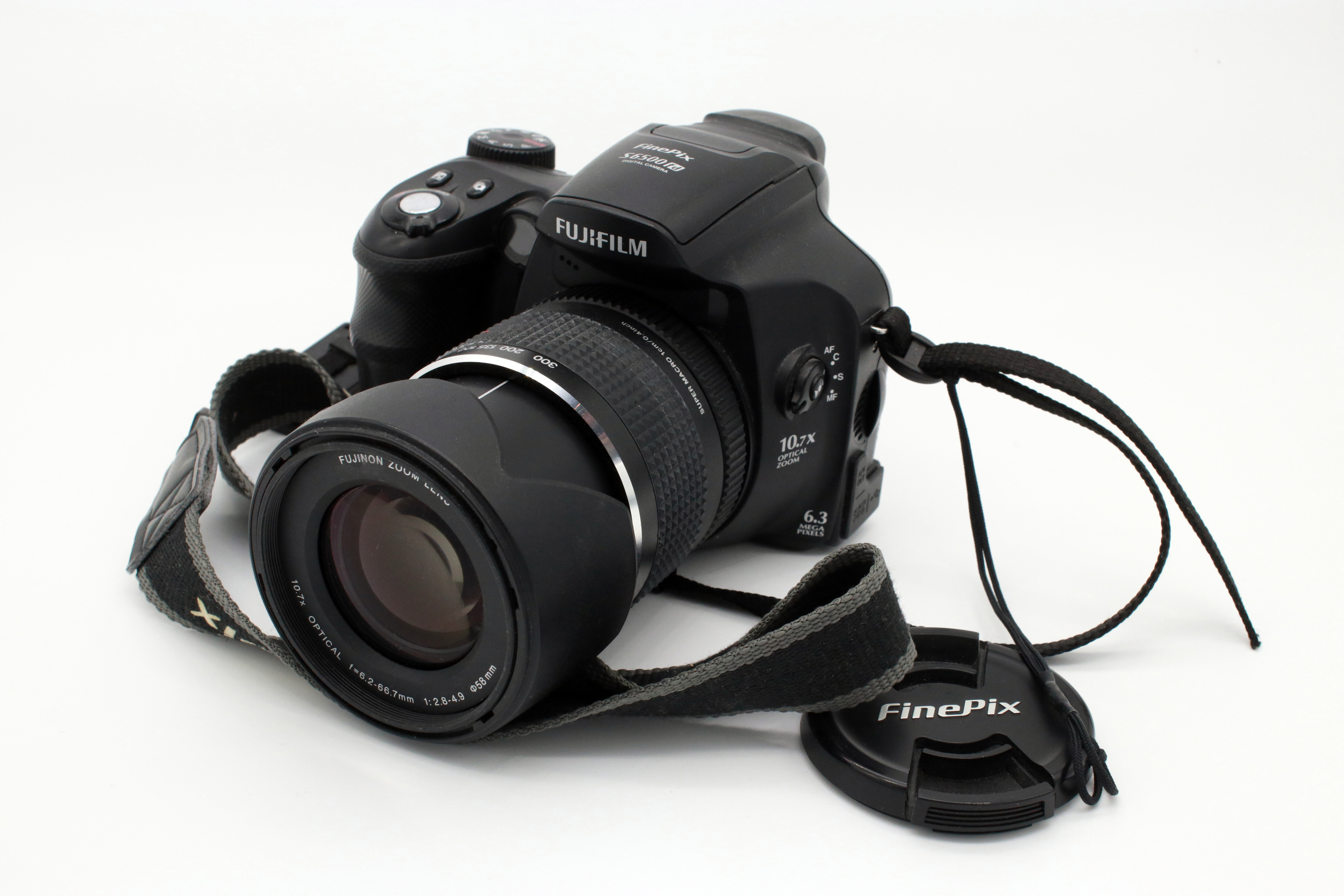
FinePix S6500fd

The Fujifilm FinePix S6500fd (fd signifying face detection), known in the United States as S6000fd, was the first digital camera from Fujifilm with face detection technology. Also this camera has a different lens from its recent predecessors — a 28–300 mm equivalent 10.7x zoom, the same as the FinePix S9100/9600. The camera was announced on July 13, 2006.

== Features ==
- Sensor: 6.3-megapixel 1/1.7-inch Super CCD HR - maximum resolution of 2848 × 2136
- Manual Mode. Program Mode. Shutter Priority. Aperture Priority and Scene Modes
- Sensitivity: ISO 100 to 3200 (incl. automatic mode)
- Shutter speed: 30 – 1/4000 sec (extremes depending on exposure mode)
- Fujinon 10.7× optical zoom lens
  - Focal length: 28–300 mm (35 mm equivalent)
  - Aperture: f/2.8-11 (wide) f/4.9-11 (long)
- Video/audio recording and the ability to shoot RAW or jpeg images.
- Dual-shot mode
- Face detection technology

== See also ==
- Fujifilm FinePix S-series
