= Fujifilm FinePix S1500 =

2009 digital bridge camera

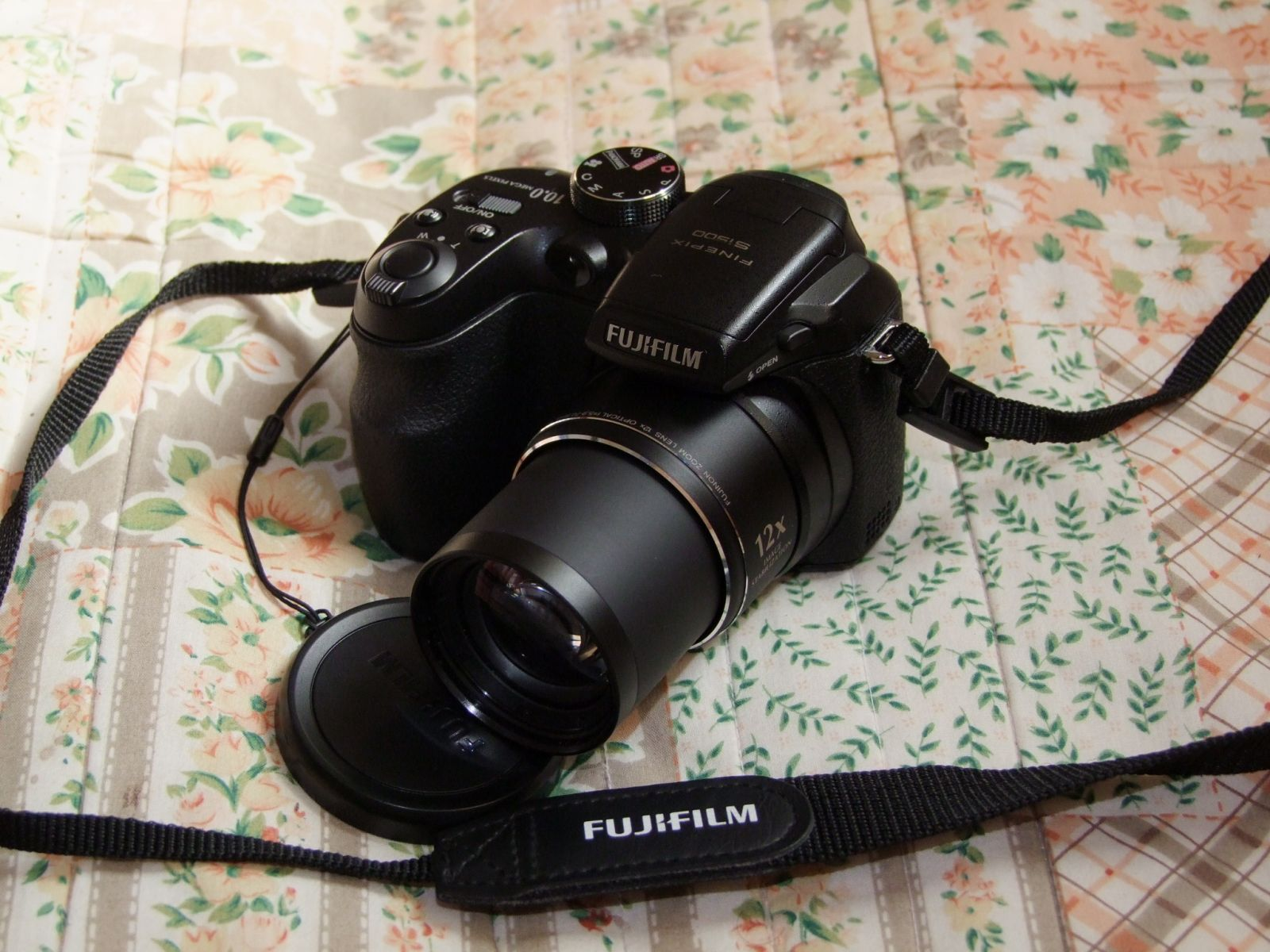
Fujifilm Finepix S1500

The Fujifilm Finepix S1500 is a discontinued 2009 digital camera manufactured by Fujifilm as part of their Finepix range. It is a superzoom compact camera, resembling a small Digital SLR camera.

== Specification ==
Below are the technical specifications of the Finepix S1500.

Specification
Effective Pixels	10.0 Million (10 Megapixels)
Zoom	Optical: 12x Digital: 5.7x
CCD sensor	1/2.3 inch CCD
Lens	Fujinon 12x optical zoom lens, F2.8 (Wide) - F5.0 (Telephoto)
Lens focal length	f=5.9 - 70.8mm (equivalent to 33 - 396mm on a 35mm camera)
ISO Sensitivity	Auto / Auto (800) / Auto (400) / Equivalent to ISO 64 / 100 / 200 / 400 / 800 / 1600 / 3200 / 6400 (Standard Output Sensitivity) (NB: 3200 / 6400: 3 Megapixels or lower (Number of recorded pixels))
Memory Card compatibility	SD, SDHC (up to 32GB), Micro/Mini SD (with adaptor)
Batteries	4 x AA (Alkaline or rechargeable)
