= Fujifilm FinePix S3500 =

Digital camera

FujiFilm FinePix S3500 is a digital camera with a 6x optical zoom lens. The camera was released in 2005, and replaced the finepix S3100.

The camera takes standard xD picture cards, can take pictures of between 0.3 and 4 megapixels, and movies of either 160 x 120 pixels, or 320 x 240 pixels resolution without sound. The camera bears a 1.5 inch LCD screen, 2.5x digital zoom, and a 55mm adaptor ring which helps protect the lens from physical harm and sun glare. A Wide angle or telephoto converter (sold separately) can be added in conjunction with the adaptor ring.

The camera offers a fully automatic mode, several scene modes, and a manual mode which is more of an aperture priority mode. This gives the user control over the sharpness, flash strength, white balance, and exposure compensation. The shutter speed ranges from 1/1500 to 2 seconds. It can make videos in 320×240 or 640×480 sizes. Sound cannot be recorded in video mode.
