= Fujifilm FinePix S3000 =

2003 digital camera

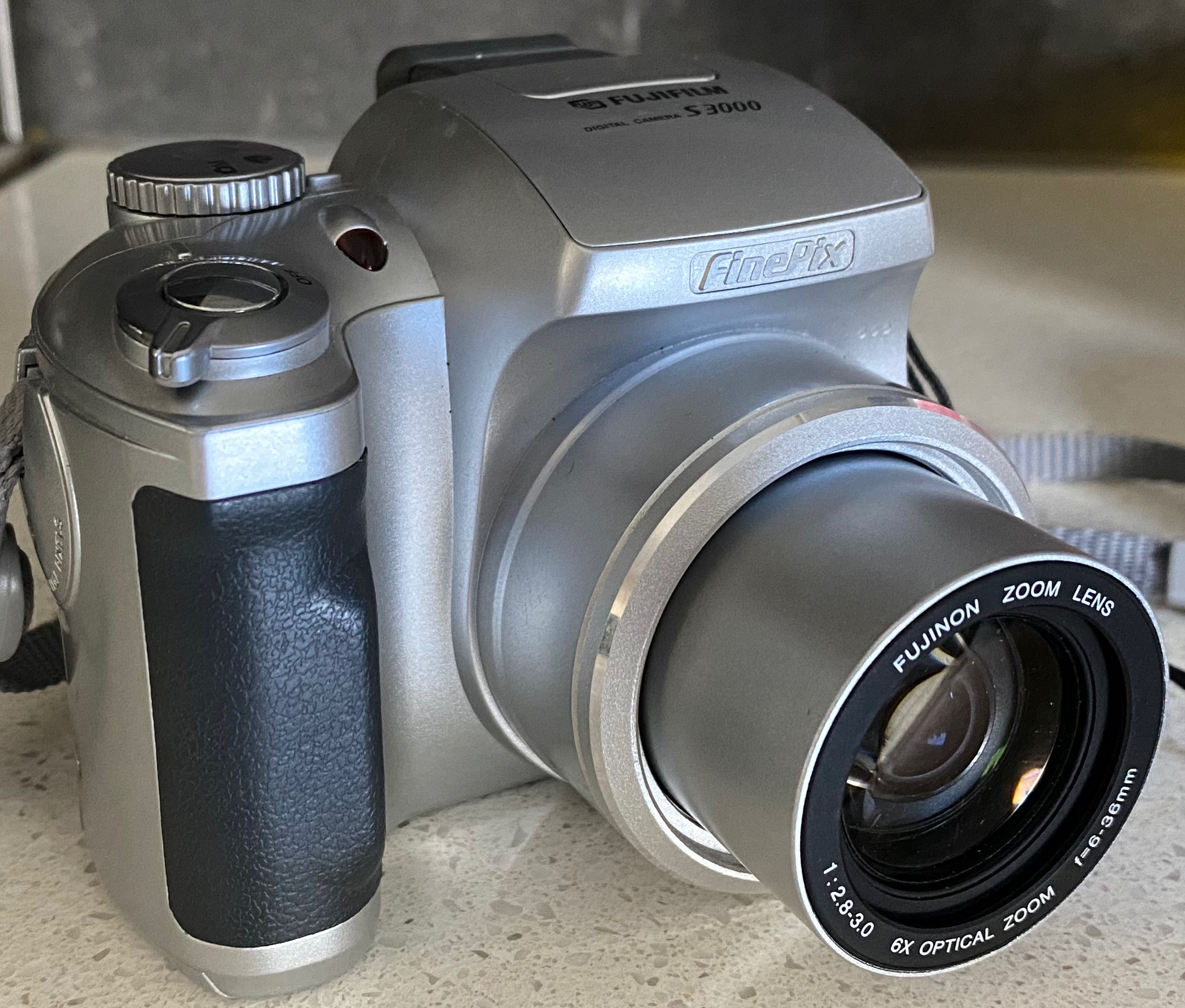
Fujifilm FinePix S3000 with lens extended

The Fujifilm FinePix S3000 is a 3.2 megapixel digital camera with a 6x optical zoom lens. The camera was introduced in 2003 as the replacement for the FinePix 3800.
