= Bridge camera =

Camera with features between point and shoot and mirrorless/SLR

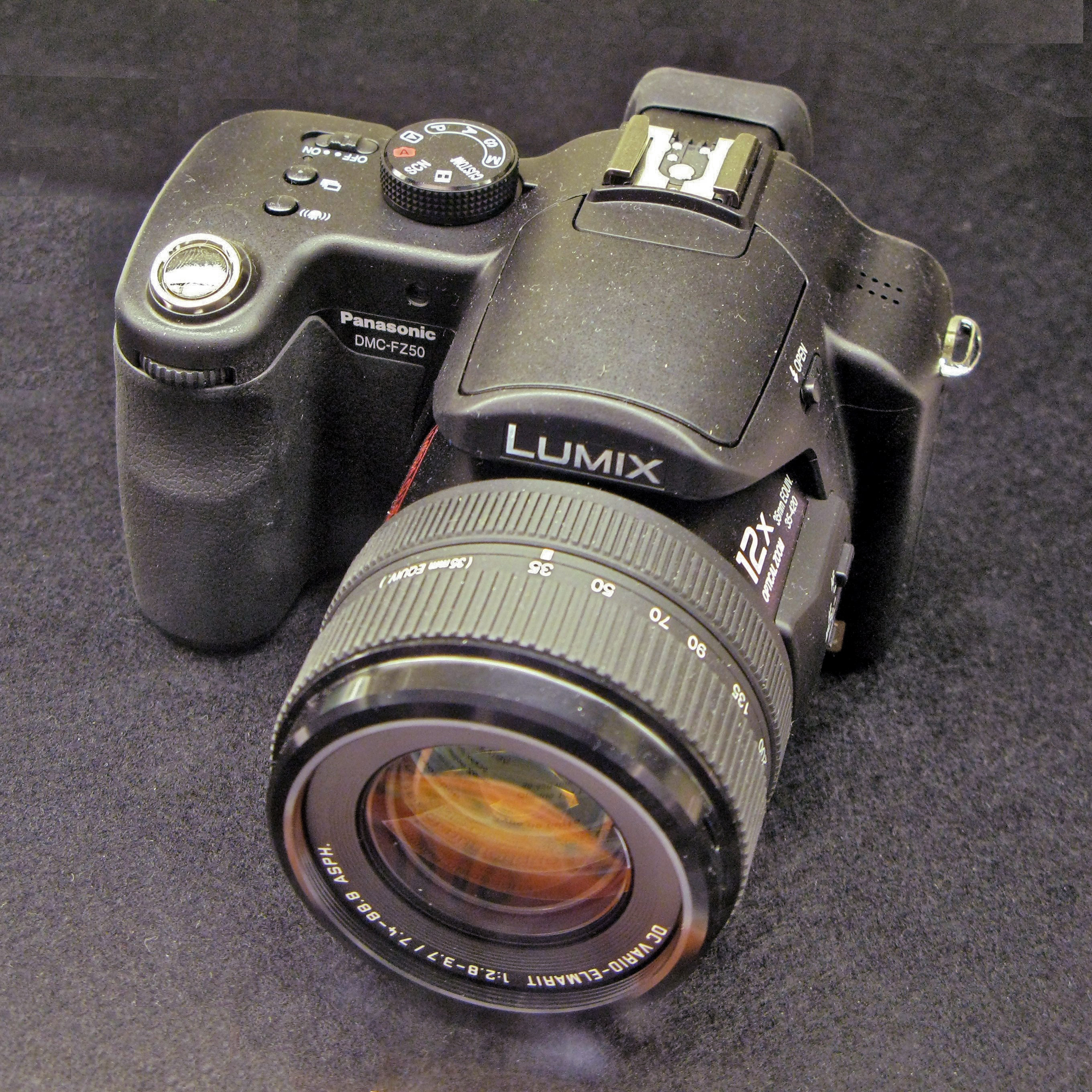
The Panasonic Lumix DMC-FZ50 bridge digital camera

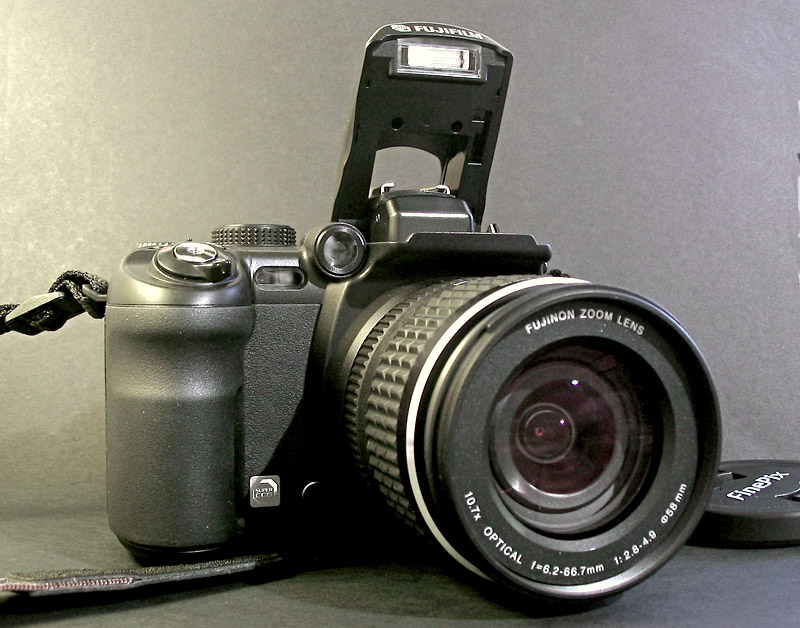
The Fujifilm FinePix S9000 bridge camera

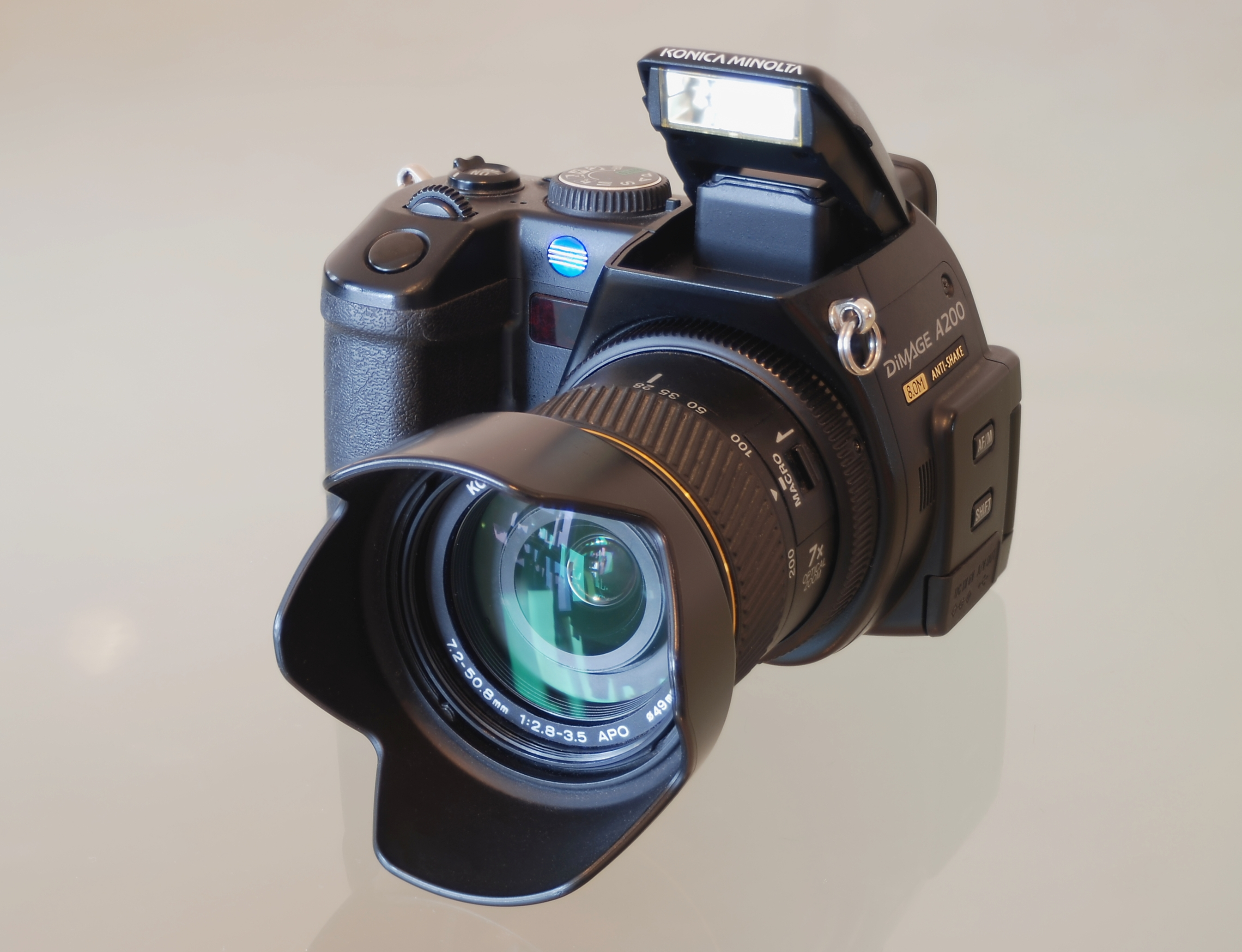
The Konica Minolta DiMAGE A200 (2005)

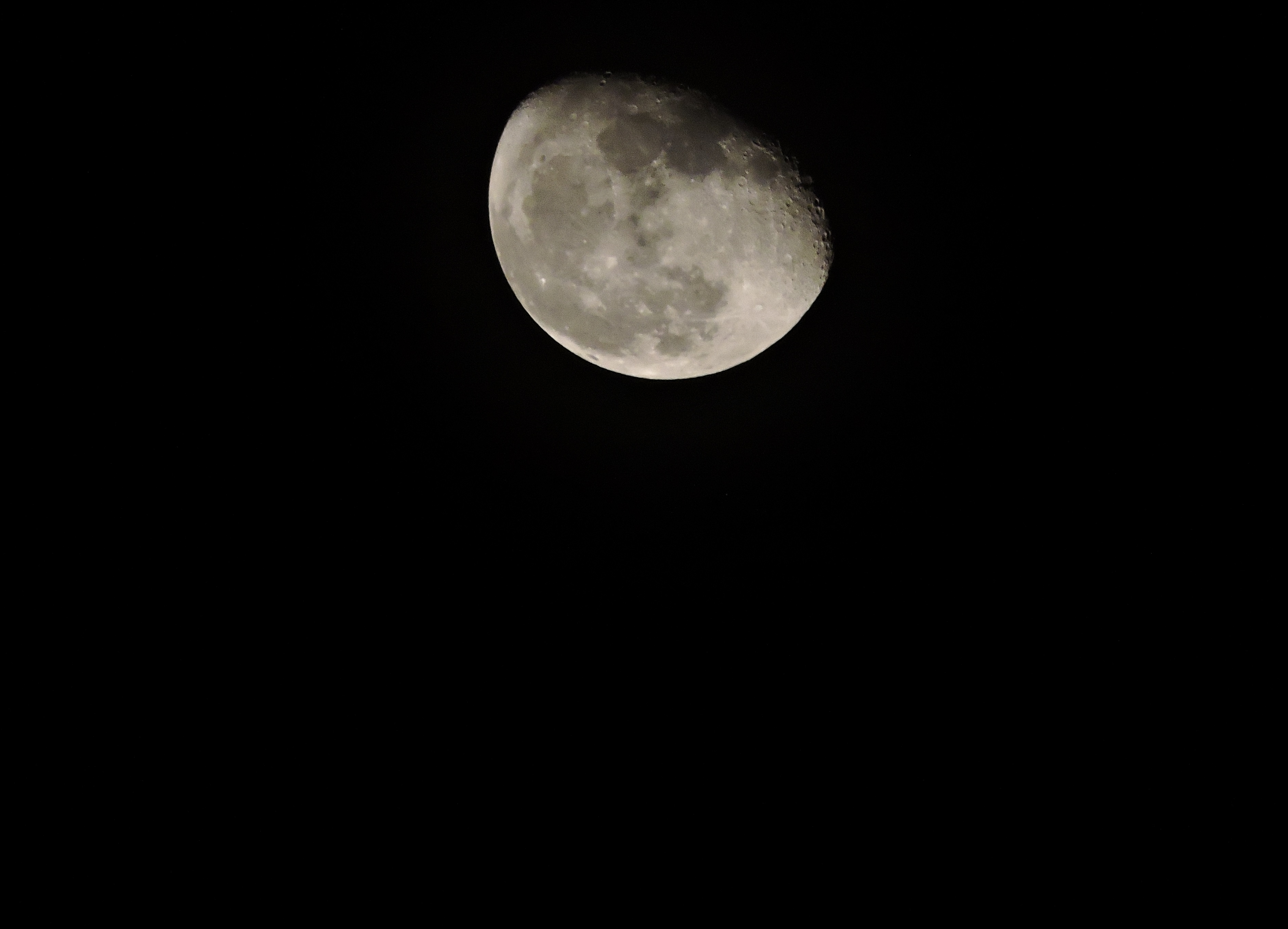
A shot of the moon from a Nikon P530 42X superzoom bridge camera.

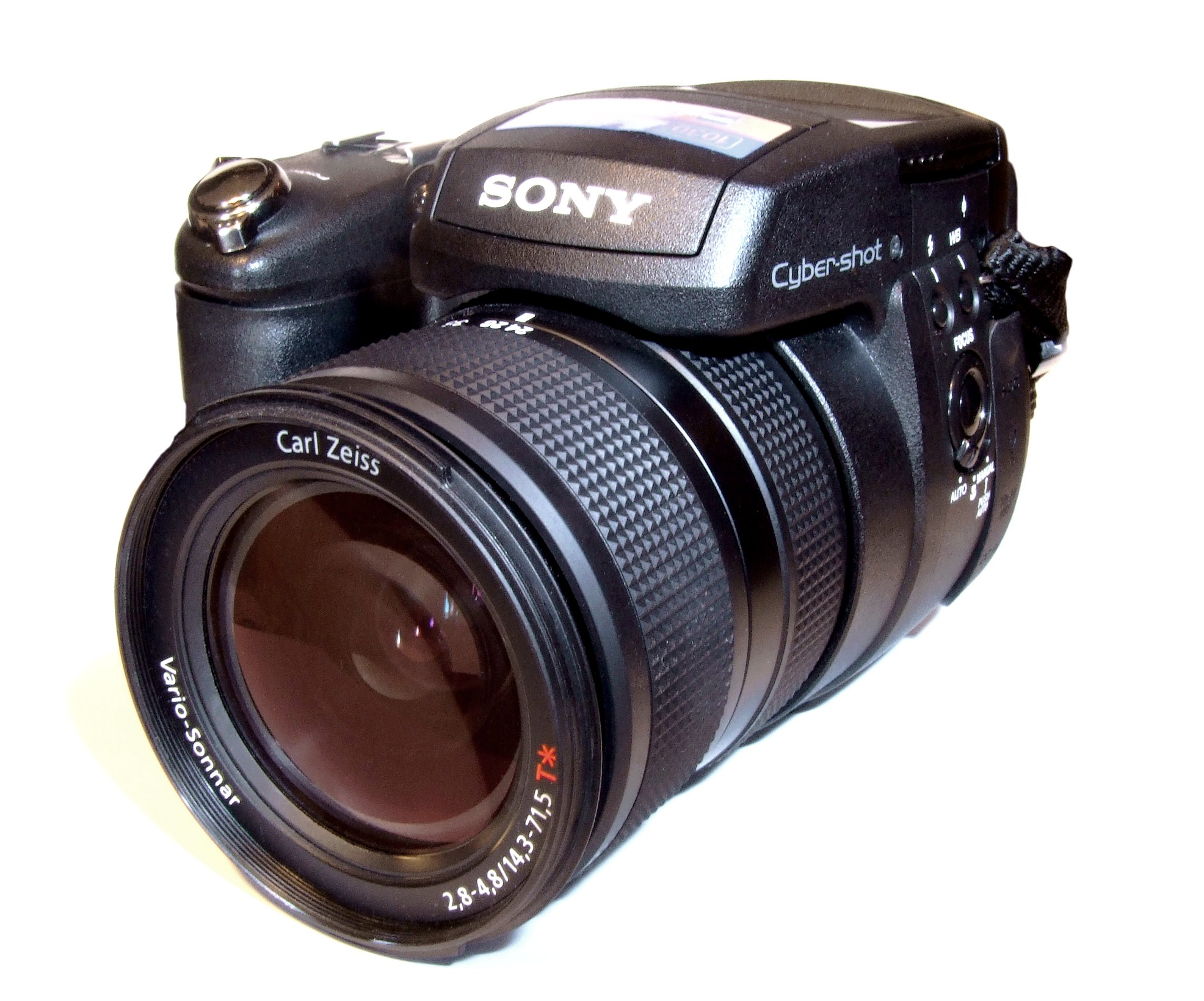
The Sony DSC-R1

A bridge camera is a type of camera that fills the niche between relatively simple point-and-shoot cameras and interchangeable-lens cameras such as mirrorless cameras and single-lens reflex cameras (SLRs). They are often comparable in size and weight to the smallest digital SLRs (DSLR), but lack interchangeable lenses, and almost all digital bridge cameras lack an optical viewfinder system. The phrase "bridge camera" has been in use at least since the 1980s, and continues to be used with digital cameras. The term was originally used to refer to film cameras which "bridged the gap" between point-and-shoot cameras and SLRs.

Like other cameras, most current bridge cameras are digital. These cameras typically feature full manual controls over shutter speed, aperture, ISO sensitivity, color balance and metering. Generally, their feature sets are similar to consumer DSLRs, except for a smaller range of ISO sensitivity because of their typically smaller image sensor.

Many bridge cameras have long zoom lenses which now often start at a super wide-angle focal length of 20 or 22mm equivalent focal length (in 35mm film camera terms), so the term "bridge camera" is sometimes used interchangeably with "megazoom", "superzoom", or "ultrazoom". However, some bridge cameras have only moderate or short zooms (such as the Canon Powershot G9), while many compact cameras have superzoom lenses but lack the advanced functions of a bridge camera.

With zoom ranges and sales rapidly increasing in the early 21st century, every major camera manufacturer has at least one superzoom camera in its lineup.

== Comparison to other camera types ==
Digital bridge cameras offer the convenience of a point-and-shoot in the form factor of a DSLR. The most notable physical similarity is the location of a bridge camera’s electronic viewfinder (EVF): centered above the lens like a DSLR’s optical viewfinder. While many digital point-and-shoots lack a viewfinder, almost every bridge camera includes an EVF, with the exception of the Canon G3 X (that offered it as an optional accessory) and some low-end models, such as the Nikon B600.

Like point-and-shoots and unlike DSLRs, bridge cameras are mirrorless. Because there is no lens mount (unlike on a mirrorless interchangeable-lens camera), the lens assembly of a bridge camera is able to extend into the body almost all the way to the sensor, making more efficient use of the space.

All current models include a power zoom lens that retracts when not in use and is controlled by a lever on the body like on a point-and-shoot, but a few past models such as the Fujifilm X-S1 and S9000 included a manual zoom lens controlled by a ring on the lens like on an interchangeable-lens camera. Unlike most point-and-shoots with a zoom lens, bridge cameras require a manual lens cap, as they do not include an automatic lens cover.

The additional size of a bridge camera compared to a compact camera makes room to fit a larger image sensor, a lens with a larger aperture or longer zoom, or some combination of both. For example, the Sony RX100 VII (compact camera) and RX10 (bridge camera) have the same zoom range (24mm to 200mm equiv.), but the RX100 VII’s maximum aperture at 200mm is f/4.5, whereas the RX10’s maximum aperture at 200mm is f/2.8, which means it can collect over twice the amount of light. Likewise, the Canon SX620 (compact camera) and G3 X (bridge camera) both have a 25× optical zoom, but the G3 X’s sensor is over 4 times as large as the SX620’s. Superzoom compact cameras have reached up to 40× optical zoom, whereas bridge cameras have reached up to 125× optical zoom.

== One fixed but versatile lens ==
Bridge cameras typically have small image sensors, allowing their lenses also to be smaller than a 35mm or APS-C SLR lens covering the same zoom range. As a result, very large zoom ranges (from wide-angle to telephoto, including macro) are feasible with one lens. The typical bridge camera has a telephoto zoom limit of over 400mm (35mm equivalent), although some 21st-century cameras reach up to 2000mm. For this reason, bridge cameras typically fall into the category of superzoom cameras.

One example of a fixed, versatile lens is the 24× Zoom Nikkor ED 4.6-110.4mm f2.8-5.0 on the Nikon Coolpix P90, which in 35 mm equivalent focal length terms is a 26-624mm.

== LCDs and EVFs as principal viewfinders ==
Bridge cameras employ two types of electronic screens as viewfinders: The LCD and the electronic viewfinder (EVF). All bridge cameras have an LCD with live-preview and usually in addition either an EVF or an optical viewfinder (OVF) (non-parallax-free, as opposed to the OVF of DSLRs, which is parallax-free). A high-quality EVF is one of the advanced features that distinguish bridge cameras from consumer compact cameras.

All DSLRs, by definition, have a through-the-lens OVF. Newer DSLR models typically also allow "live view" on the LCD screen as an alternative to the OVF, although frequently without autofocus or with very slow autofocus when in that mode. Mirrorless interchangeable lens cameras, which like bridge cameras are mirrorless, rely on electronic viewfinders or LCD screens and generally do not sacrifice autofocus features when using these displays.

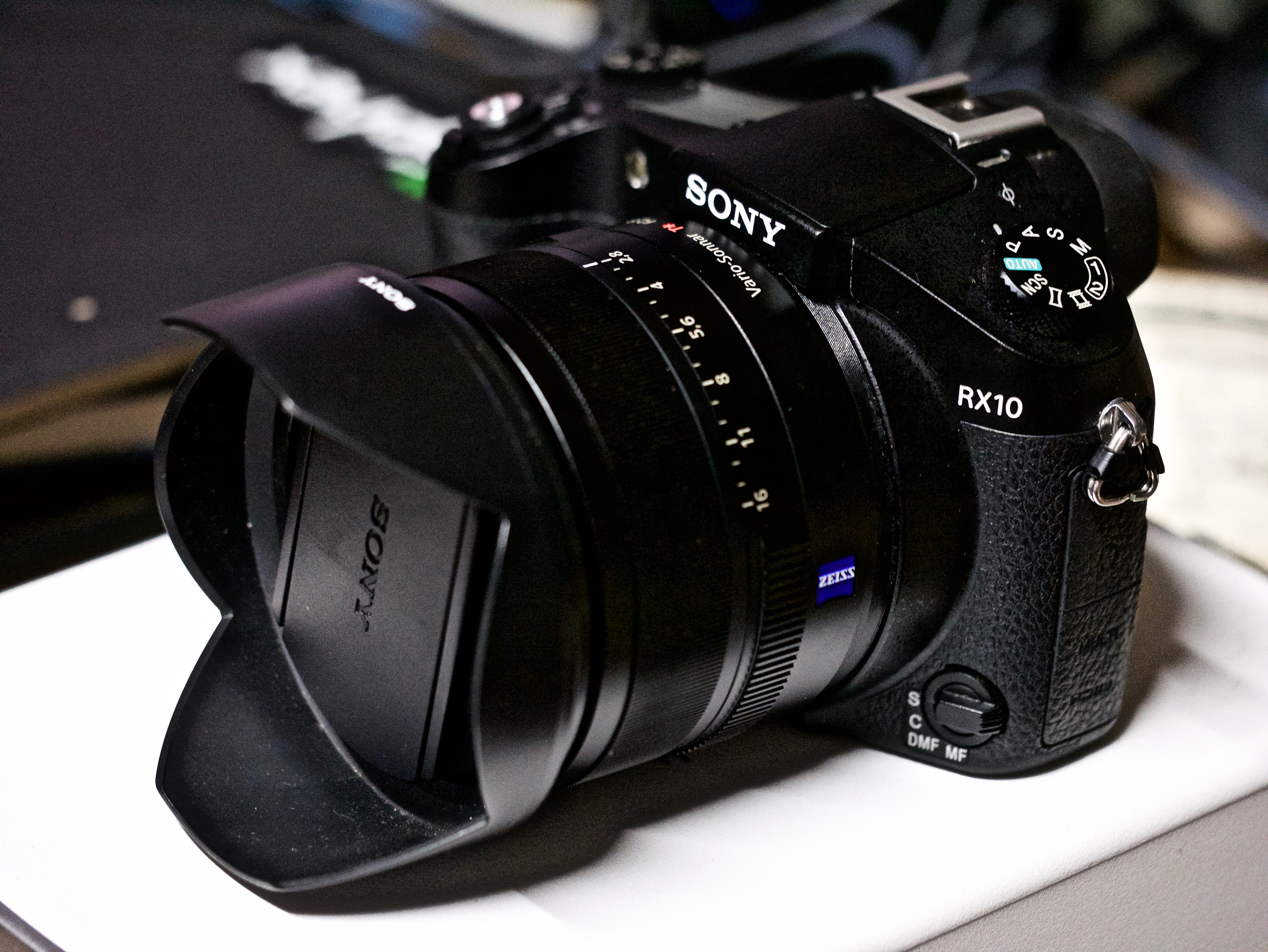
Sony Cyber-shot DSC-RX10 (2014) - a bridge camera that sports a large 1 inch sensor

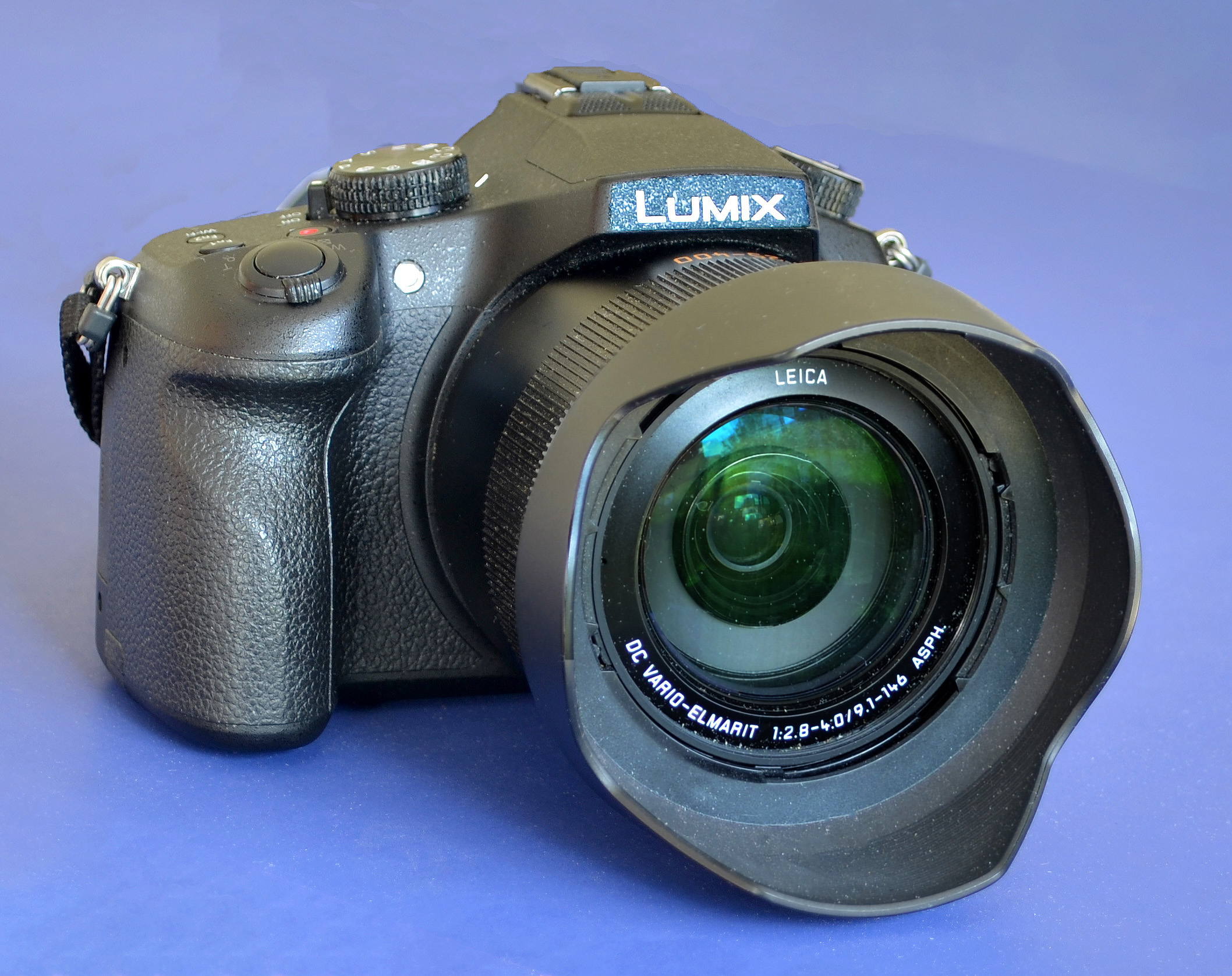
Panasonic LUMIX DMC-FZ1000 large sensor Bridge camera

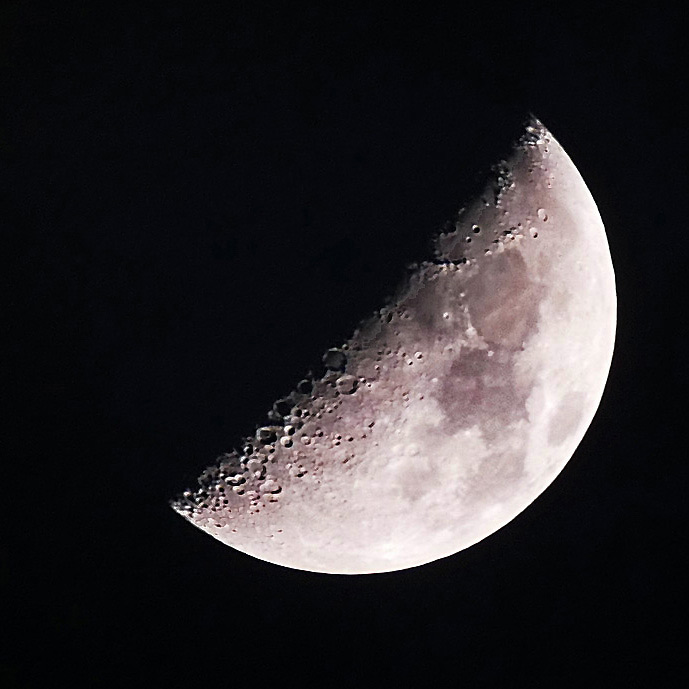
1st Quarter Moon taken with Panasonic FZ1000

== Large-sensor bridge cameras ==
Just as in compact cameras, there is a trend towards larger sensors in bridge cameras, as well. Sony started the category of 1 inch sensor equipped bridge cameras in 2012 with the Sony Cyber-shot DSC-RX100, followed in late 2013 with the release of the Sony RX10. In 2014, Panasonic followed this with the FZ1000, which has a larger zoom range, up to 400mm equivalent (Sony's RX10 goes to 200mm equivalent). In contrast with the RX10's constant f/2.8 widest aperture Zeiss lens, the Panasonic FZ1000 has a variable f/2.8 to f/4 Leica creation. Sony's DSC-R1 issued as early as 2005 has a 10MP APS-sized sensor combined with a Zeiss zoom lens. In terms of image quality, these cameras are comparable to Canon's DSLRs and similarly priced.

== Market ==
In late 2012, Techradar wrote that while the general compact camera market was on a downturn, the DSLR-like bridge camera market was continuing well. In 2014, CNET mentioned that for the last couple of years, Fujifilm focused on producing rugged compact cameras and bridge cameras as those segments continue to show strong sales.

== See also ==
- List of bridge cameras
- List of superzoom compact cameras
- List of large sensor fixed-lens cameras
