= Panasonic Lumix DMC-FZ5 =

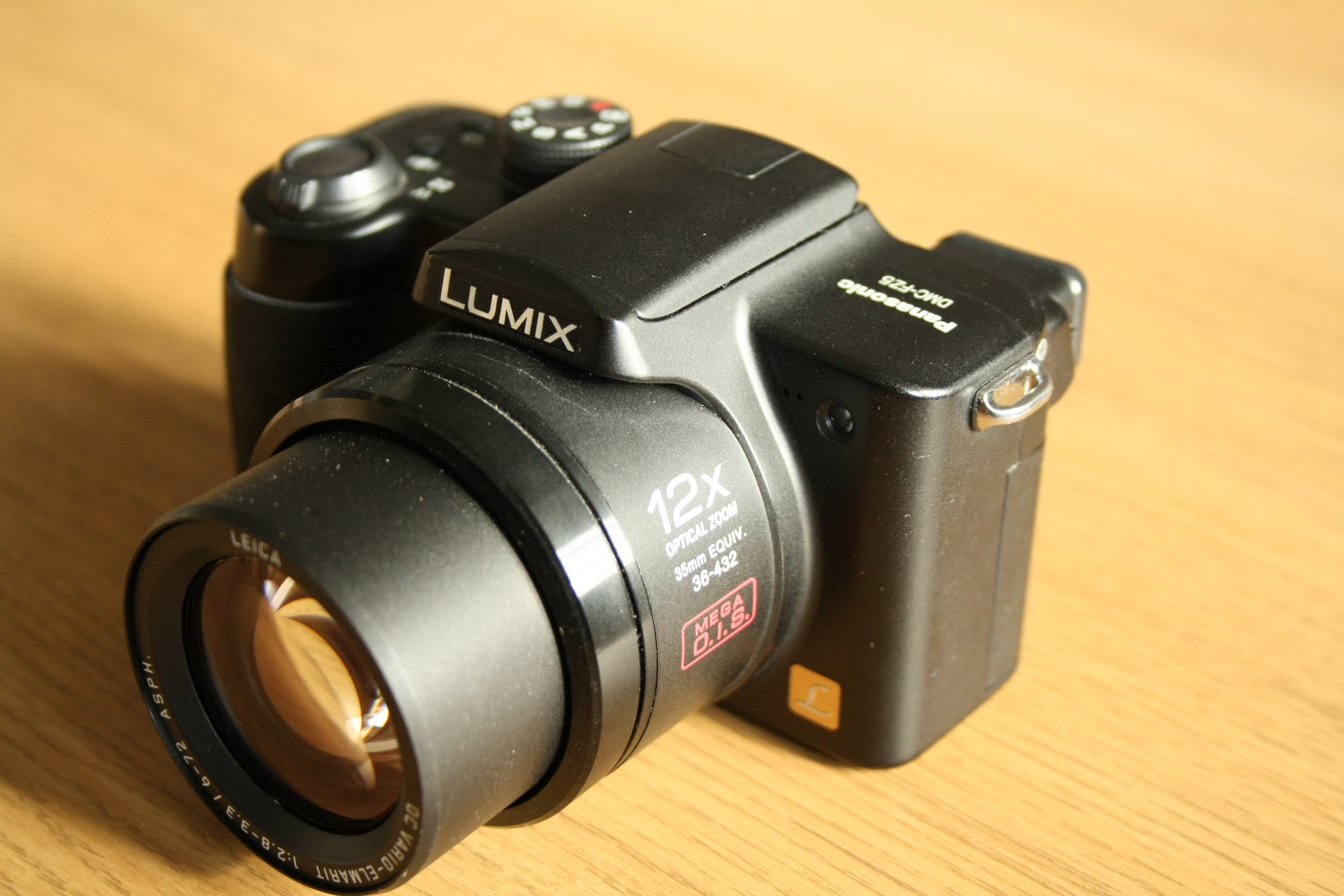

Overview
- Maker: Panasonic Holdings Corporation
- Type: Bridge digital camera

Lens
- Lens: Fixed

Sensor/medium
- Sensor: CCD
- Maximum resolution: 2,560 × 1,920 (5 million)
- Storage media: Secure Digital Card and Multi Media Card

Viewfinder
- Viewfinder: Liquid crystal display

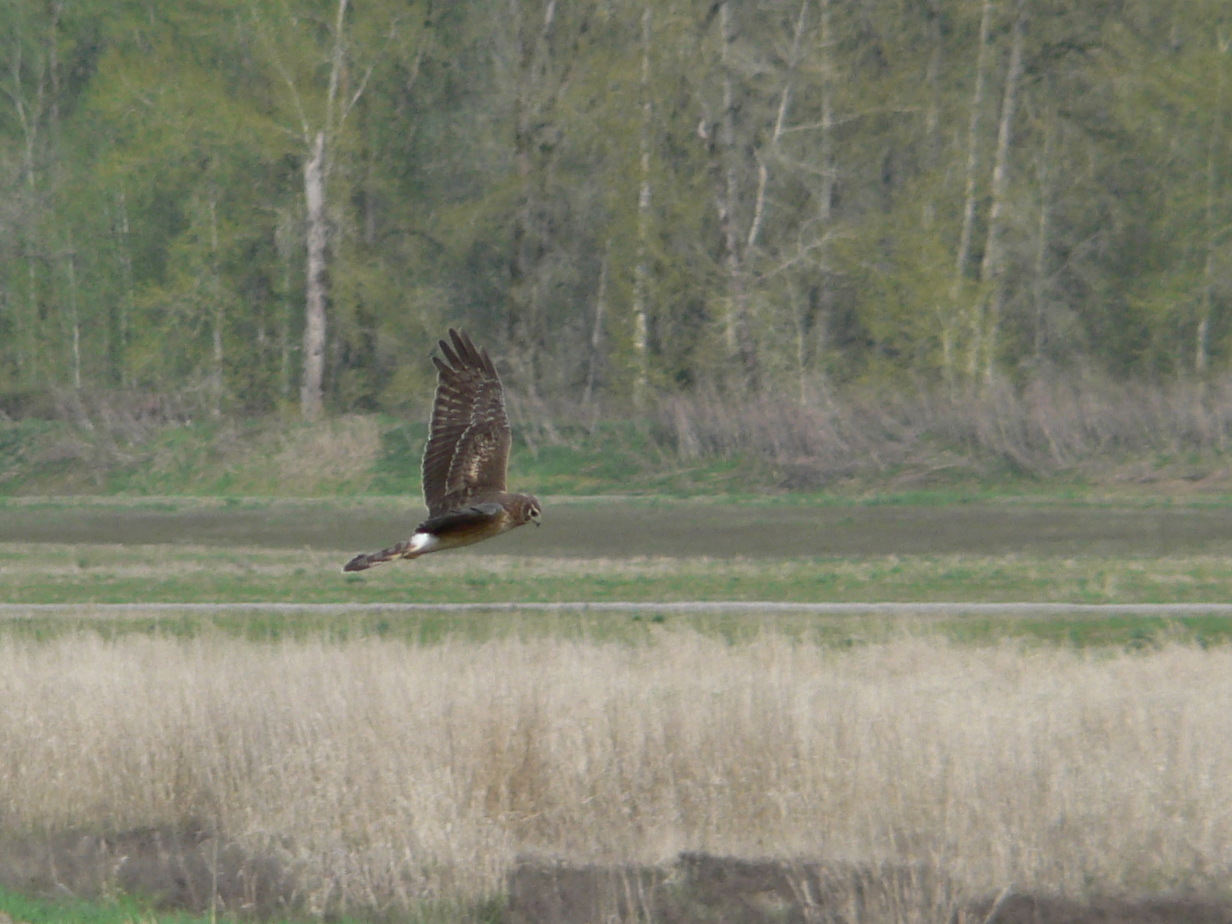
The long focal length, short shutter delay and image stabilization contribute to the quality of this image of a Northern Harrier in flight

The Panasonic Lumix DMC-FZ5 is a superzoom bridge digital camera. It has Universal Serial Bus connectivity and has a mass of 326 grams (11.5 oz). It is featured with a black or silver model and was released by Panasonic in February 2005.

Like its predecessors the 2-megapixel FZ1 and FZ2, it has its 12× optical zoom-lens designed by Leica, with the 35 mm equivalents being 36–432. In which, it has the improved optical image stabilization system (Mega O.I.S) and the Venus II engine, which helps process its images faster, after a shooting.

Likewise, because of its functions, it is as though the FZ20 has come down to size. The only functions that the FZ5 does not include is its manual focus ring, flash hotshoe, and ED lens-element.

Although the FZ20's lens also has frozen aperture at f/2.8 through the full zoom-range, the DMC-FZ5's is at 2.8–3.3, a relatively minor difference.

The FZ5 has since been replaced by the FZ7.

Preceded by Panasonic Lumix DMC-FZ2	Panasonic Lumix DMC-FZ5	Succeeded by Panasonic Lumix DMC-FZ7
