= Panasonic Lumix DMC-FZ38 =

Panasonic Lumix DMC-FZ38/DMC-FZ35
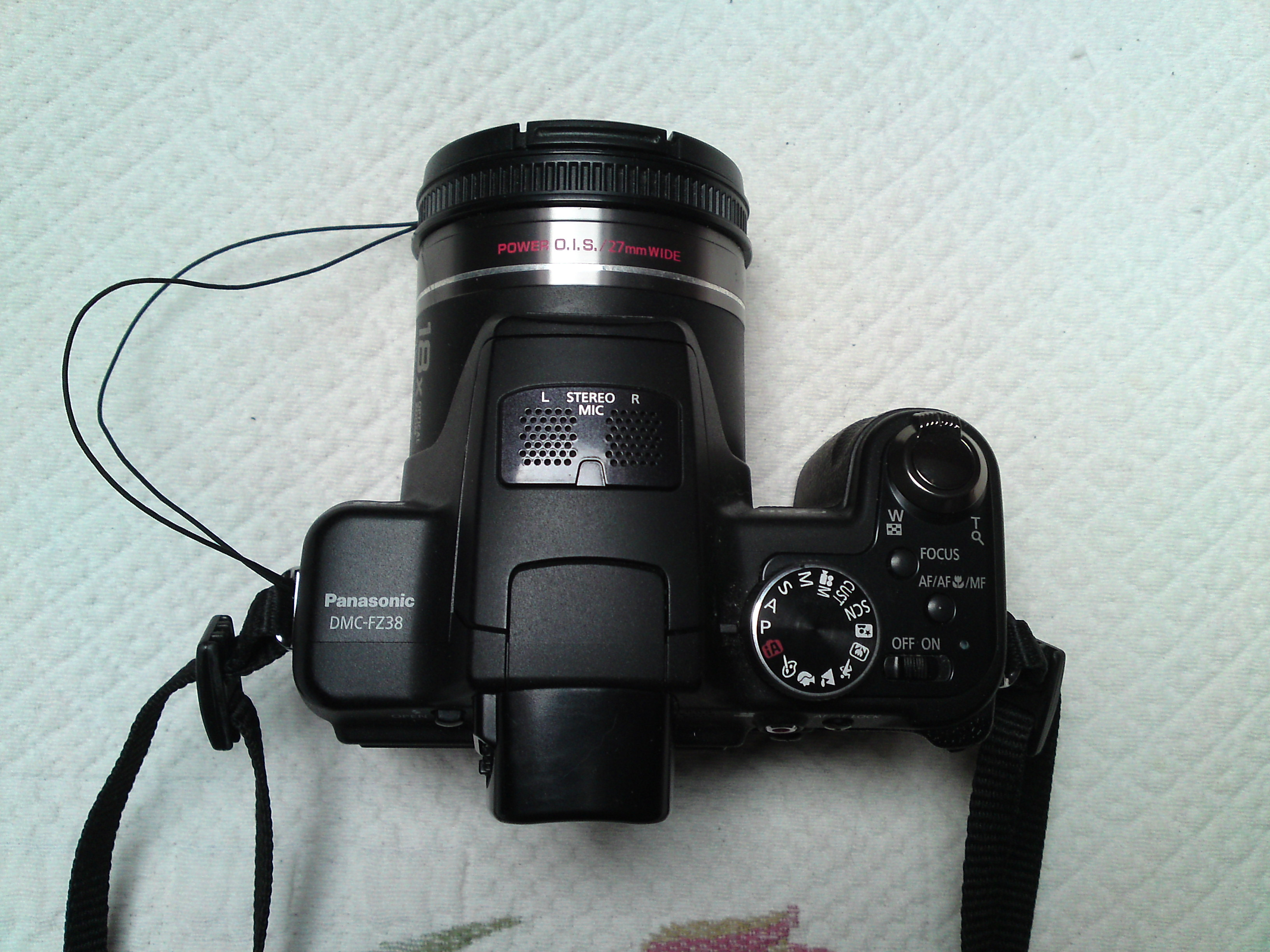

Overview
- Maker: Panasonic Holdings Corporation
- Type: Bridge digital camera

Lens
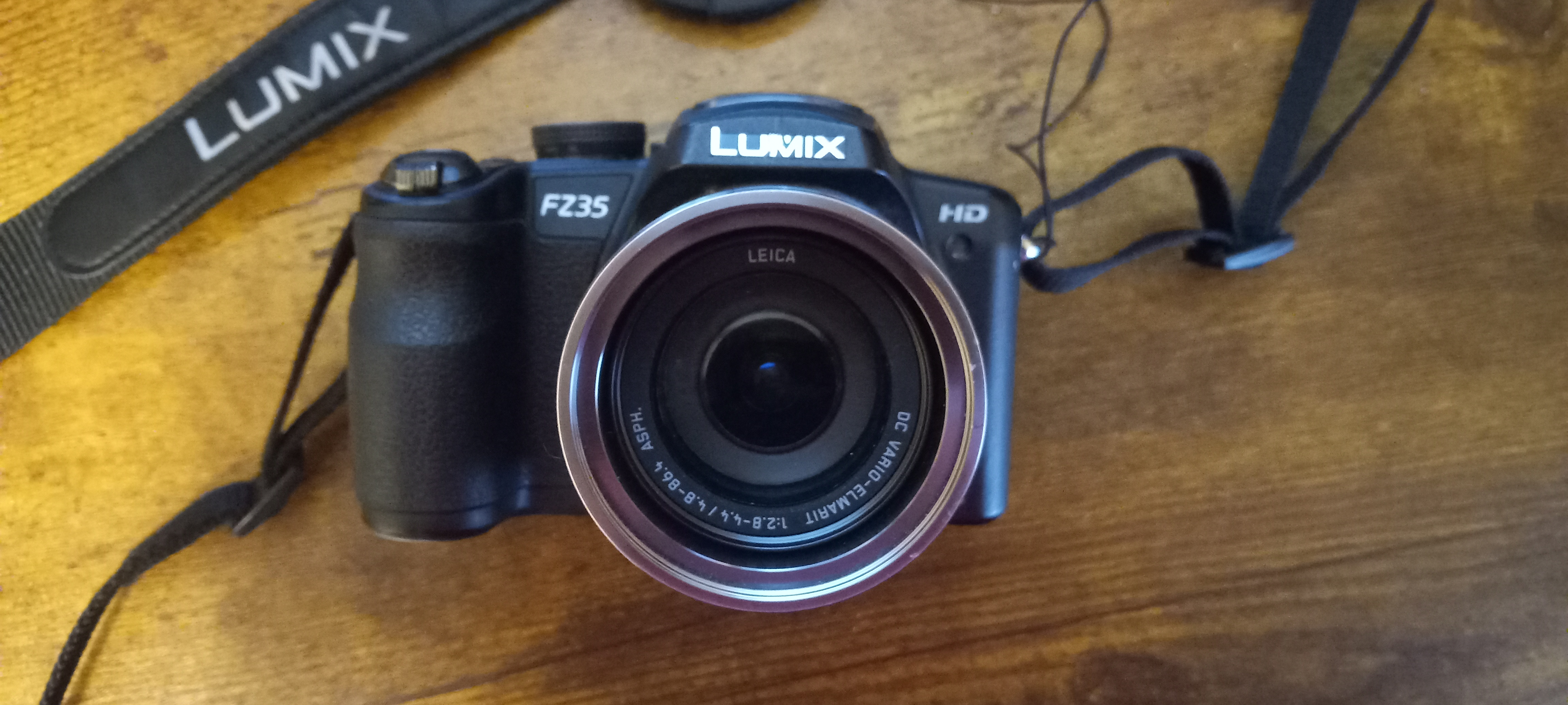
- Lens: 27-486 mm (18x optical zoom) F2.8 - F4.4 Leica Elmarit Front view without cap of fz35 lumix

Sensor/medium
- Sensor: 1/2.33" CCD
- Maximum resolution: 4000x3000 (12.7 megapixels)
- Film speed: ISO 100-1600 (High-sensitiviy mode 1600-6400)
- Storage media: SD, SDHC, internal

Focusing
- Focus areas: 9-area

Flash
- Flash: Built-in pop up

Shutter
- Shutter: Manual
- Shutter speed range: 1/2000 sec up to 60 sec

Viewfinder
- Viewfinder: EVF and 2.7 inch colour LCD (230,000 pixels)

Image processing
- White balance: Manual

General
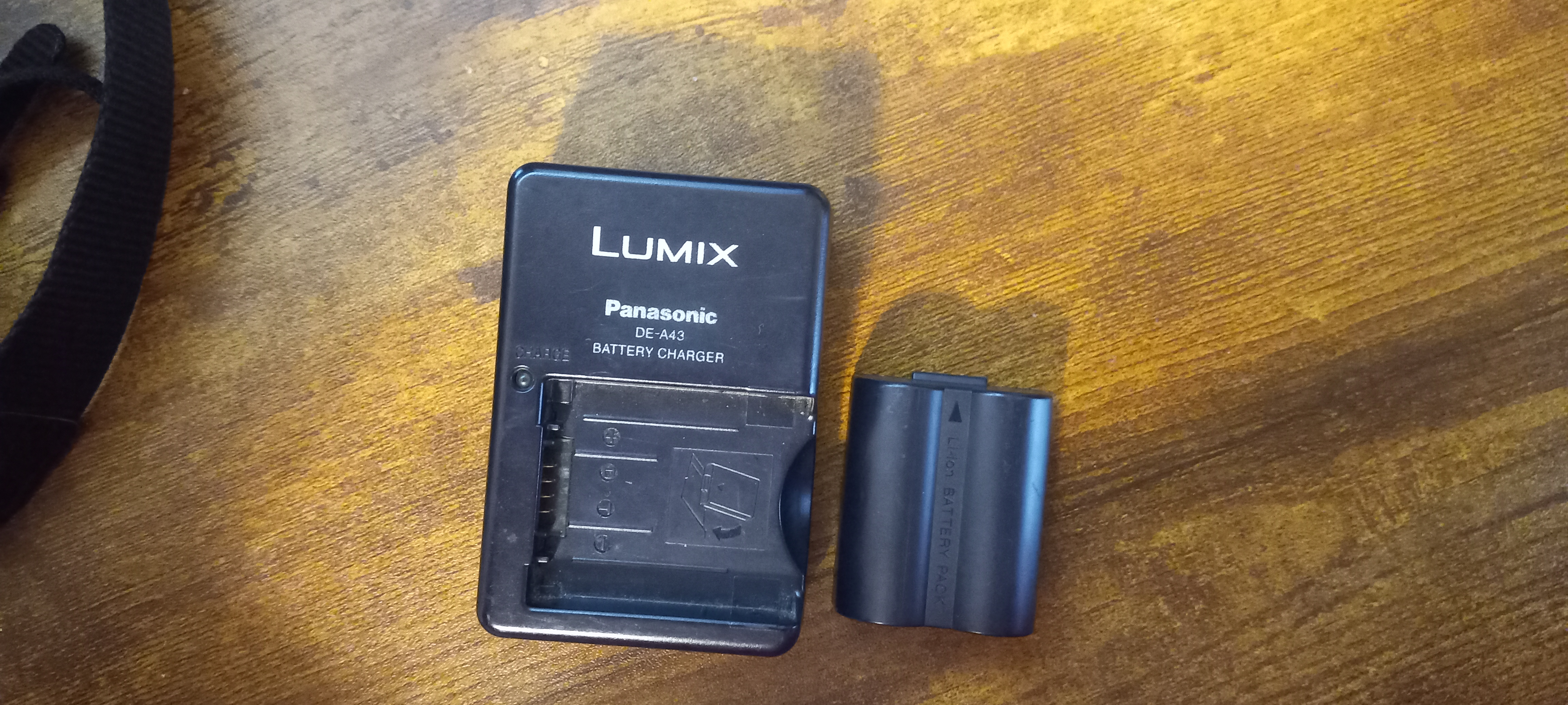
- Battery: Battery Li-Ion 7.2 V, 695 mAh Panasonic battery charger and battery for DMC-FZ35
- Weight: 414 g (15 oz)

The Panasonic Lumix DMC-FZ38 is a superzoom bridge digital camera, replacing the similar Panasonic Lumix DMC-FZ28 and earlier Panasonic Lumix DMC-FZ18. It is also known as the DMC-FZ35 in North America.

== Capabilities ==
The Panasonic Lumix DMC-FZ38/DMC-FZ35 use a Leica lens. The Leica 'DC VARIO-ELMARIT 1:2.8-4.4 / 4.8-86.4 ASPH.' lens is a aspherical telescoping lens.

Both models share similarities with the specs, differing by the name alone.

Some features include an electronic viewfinder, pop up flash, and a back-facing LCD panel.

The camera has many modes allowing for auto intelligence mode where the camera adjusts automatically using its sensors. It also has standard macro modes, scenery portrait, sports mode.

The camera shoots movies in AVCHD Lite format and has options to set aspects in the custom movie mode and add color affects.

Creative Mode giving you less customization but an easier UI then manual mode, such as manual blur and focus and BW/SEPIA/COLOR.

There is also manual, shutter priority, aperture priority, and program mode. Besides these modes, the camera has 20 other preset modes within the scene menu.

The FZ35 and FZ38 can shoot in the following formats: Raw Image Format, JPEG, Lossless JPEG.

Preceded by Panasonic Lumix DMC-FZ28	Panasonic Lumix DMC-FZ38; 2009-	Succeeded by Panasonic Lumix DMC-FZ45
