= Panasonic Lumix DMC-FZ1 =

Overview
- Maker: Panasonic
- Type: Bridge digital camera
- Released: October 9, 2002

Lens
- Lens: 4.6–55.2mm (35-420mm equiv.)
- F-numbers: f/2.8 (constant max.)

Sensor/medium
- Sensor type: CCD
- Sensor size: 4.544 × 3.408mm (1/3.2 inch type)
- Maximum resolution: 1600 × 1200 (2 megapixels)
- Storage media: SD / MMC

Focusing
- Focus: TTL Autofocus

Exposure/metering
- Exposure modes: Simple/ Record/ Macro/ Portrait/ Sports/ Panning/ Night Portrait
- Exposure metering: Intelligent Multiple/ Spot

Flash
- Flash: Manual popup (Auto/ Red-eye/ Slow-sync/ Fill)

Shutter
- Shutter speeds: 1/2000s to 8s
- Continuous shooting: 4 frames per second

Viewfinder
- Viewfinder: EVF w/ diopter adj.

Image processing
- Image processor: Venus Engine (I)
- White balance: TTL Auto/ Daylight/ Cloudy/ Halogen/ Custom

General
- Video recording: 320 × 240 (QVGA) @ 10fps
- LCD screen: 1.5 inches with 114,000 dots
- Battery: Rechargeable 7.2v 680mAh Li-ion battery pack
- Data port: Mini USB v1.1
- Dimensions: 125 × 70 × 83mm (4.92 × 2.76 × 3.27 inches)
- Weight: 354 g (12 oz) including battery
- Made in: Japan

The Panasonic Lumix DMC-FZ1 is a digital bridge camera announced by Panasonic on September 29, 2002.

The FZ1 featured a Leica-branded lens with a constant minimum aperture of f/2.8 over its full 12× (35–420mm equivalent) zoom range. It was the first Lumix camera to include Panasonic's image stabilization technology, which they dubbed Mega O.I.S. In addition the FZ1 could capture 320 × 240 (QVGA) video.

== See also ==
- List of bridge cameras
