= Panasonic Lumix DMC-FZ28 =

2008 digital camera model

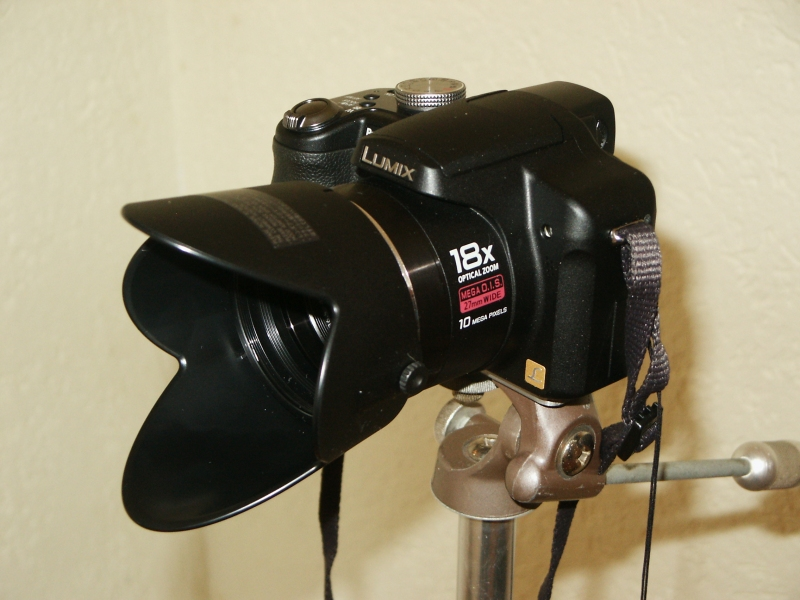

Overview
- Maker: Panasonic Holdings Corporation
- Type: Bridge digital camera

Lens
- Lens: 27-486 mm (18x optical zoom) F2.8 - F4.4

Sensor/medium
- Sensor: 1/2.33" CCD
- Maximum resolution: 3648x2736 (10.1 megapixels)
- Film speed: ISO 100-1600 (High-sensitivity mode 1600-6400)
- Storage media: SD, SDHC, internal

Focusing
- Focus modes: Automatic, Manual (joystick), Macro, AF Area Select, AF Tracking
- Focus bracketing: ±2.0 EV in 0.3 EV steps

Exposure/metering
- Exposure modes: Manual, Program, Automatic, Shutter Priority, Aperture Priority, plus various custom and defined modes
- Metering modes: Multi-segment, Center-weighted, Moveable Spot

Flash
- Flash: Built-in pop up; Range max 8.5 meters
- Flash bracketing: ±2.0 EV in 0.3 EV steps

Shutter
- Shutter speed range: 1/2000 sec up to 60 sec
- Continuous shooting: 2.5 frame/s, 5 shots

Viewfinder
- Viewfinder: EVF and 2.7 inch colour LCD (230,000 pixels)

Image processing
- White balance: 5 positions, plus 2 manual

General
- Battery: Battery id CGA-S006 Li-Ion 7.2 V, 710 mAh
- Weight: 417 g (15 oz)

The Panasonic Lumix DMC-FZ28 is a superzoom bridge digital camera, replacing the similar Panasonic Lumix DMC-FZ18. It was announced in 2008 and released for sale in the United Kingdom in August of that year. Like the FZ18 it has a Leica lens with an 18x optical zoom ratio. It has a slightly larger sensor than the FZ18, a 10.1-megapixel image resolution, and the newer Venus IV image processing engine.

== Description ==
The camera's macro mode allows the capturing of images at a distance of one centimetre. The camera also has intelligent scene detection, 15x face recognition, intelligence ISO, intelligent exposure. Three different aspect ratios are available: 4:3, 3:2 and 16:9. Still image quality settings include different qualities of JPEG output and RAW format (in .RW2 format); both JPEG and RAW recordings can be produced simultaneously. Various high-speed burst modes are available, going up to thirteen frames per second at two megapixels in 16:9 aspect ratio.

Video output is 1280x720 p at 30 frame/s HD 1080i in QuickTime format.

There are three data outputs: AV, component out, and USB2.0. Internal memory is 50 MB, supplemented by removable SD or SDHC cards of multi-gigabyte capacity.

Preceded by Panasonic Lumix DMC-FZ18	Panasonic Lumix DMC-FZ28; ~2008-2009	Succeeded by Panasonic Lumix DMC-FZ38
