= Panasonic Lumix DMC-FZ45 =

Overview
- Maker: Panasonic Holdings Corporation
- Type: Bridge digital camera

Lens
- Lens: 25-600 mm (24x optical zoom) F2.8 - F5.2 Leica DC Vario-Elmarit

Sensor/medium
- Sensor: 1/2.33" CCD
- Maximum resolution: 4320x3240 (14.1 megapixels)
- Film speed: ISO 80-1600 (High-sensitiviy mode 1600-6400)
- Storage media: SD, SDHC, SDXC, internal

Focusing
- Focus areas: 23-area

Exposure/metering
- Exposure metering: Intelligent Multiple

Flash
- Flash: Built-in pop up

Shutter
- Shutter: Manual
- Shutter speed range: 1/2000 sec up to 60 sec

Viewfinder
- Viewfinder: EVF and 3.0 inch colour LCD (230,000 pixels)

Image processing
- White balance: Manual

General
- Battery: Battery Li-Ion 7.2 V, 895 mAh
- Weight: 498 g (18 oz)

The Panasonic Lumix DMC-FZ45 (a.k.a. DMC-FZ40 in North American markets) is a superzoom bridge digital camera, replacing the similar Panasonic Lumix DMC-FZ38 and earlier Panasonic Lumix DMC-FZ28. The Panasonic Lumix DMC-FZ40/FZ45 superzoom slots in where the FZ38/35 left off, featuring the same 25-600mm equiv. lens as the FZ100, but with a 14.1MP CCD sensor and simpler 230K dot 3.0 inch fixed LCD (as opposed to the FZ100's CMOS sensor and high-res screen). The FZ40 also offers AVCHD Lite 720p HD video recording, manual shooting modes and the company's Sonic Speed auto-focus system that offers the industry's fastest focus times.

Preceded by Panasonic Lumix DMC-FZ38	Panasonic Lumix DMC-FZ45; 2010-	Succeeded by Panasonic Lumix DMC-FZ48
