= Panasonic Lumix DMC-FZ7 =

Overview
- Maker: Panasonic Holdings Corporation
- Type: Bridge digital camera
- Released: 2006

Lens
- Lens: 36-432 mm equiv., F2.8-8.0

Sensor/medium
- Sensor: 1/2.5 in CCD
- Maximum resolution: 2816×2112 (six megapixels)
- Film speed: ISO 80-1600
- Storage media: SD and MMC cards

Focusing
- Focus modes: Automatic or Manual
- Focus bracketing: ±2.0 EV in ⅓ EV steps

Exposure/metering
- Exposure modes: Simple, programmed, shutter priority, aperture priority, manual, movie, scene, macro
- Exposure metering: 30-44
- Metering modes: Matrix, center weighted, spot

Flash
- Flash: Built-in pop up; Range: Wide 0.3-6.0 m, Tele 0.3-5.4 m
- Flash bracketing: ±2.0 EV in ⅓ EV steps

Shutter
- Shutter speed range: 60-1/2000 sec
- Continuous shooting: 3 or 2 frame/s

Viewfinder
- Viewfinder: 0.33 in color LCD (114,000 pixels)

Image processing
- White balance: 2 custom modes

General
- Battery: Li-Ion 7.2 V, 710 mAh
- Weight: 310 g (11 oz) (without battery)

The Panasonic Lumix DMC-FZ7 is a six megapixel superzoom bridge digital camera that utilizes Panasonic's Venus II Engine. It features a 12× zoom lens and several modes of operation. It was replaced in 2007 by the DMC-FZ8

The main improvement over its predecessor, the FZ5, is a thumb joystick that can be used for manual focusing and for changing the exposure (shutter speed and aperture values) for a full manual shot.

The lens is manufactured by the German company Leica Camera. An optical image stabilization system is embedded in the lens, reducing blurring by compensating for camera shake.

Video recording is available at either 10 frames per second (frame/s) or 30 frame/s in VGA (640×480), QVGA (320×240) or wide-screen 16:9 (848×480) resolutions. The image can be directly made output to a TV via a provided RCA cable.

The camera was reviewed in April 2006 by PC Magazine and was awarded Editor's Choice. The camera also won a Gold award in 2006 from DIWA (Digital Imaging Websites Association).

The features are comparable to the ones offered by the Canon PowerShot S3 IS, among other cameras.

Among the main disadvantages is high noise in low-light conditions.

Preceded by Panasonic Lumix DMC-FZ5	Panasonic Lumix DMC-FZ7; ~2006	Succeeded by Panasonic Lumix DMC-FZ8
