= Panasonic Lumix DMC-FZ30 =

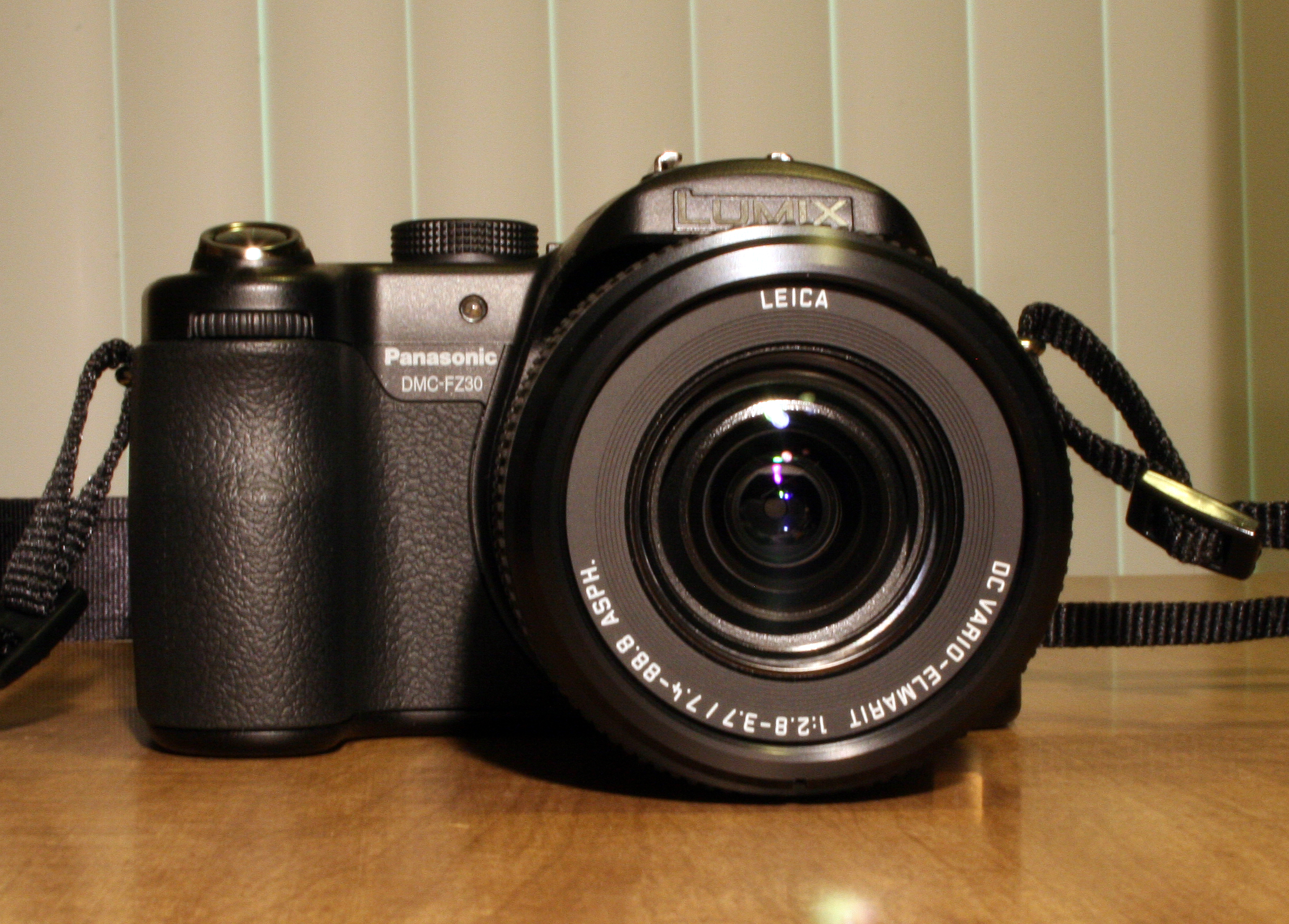

Overview
- Maker: Panasonic Holdings Corporation
- Type: Bridge digital camera

Lens
- Lens: Fixed

Sensor/medium
- Sensor: CCD
- Maximum resolution: 3,264 × 2,448 (8.32 million)
- Film speed: Auto / 80 / 100 / 200 / 400
- Storage media: Secure Digital

Focusing
- Focus modes: Auto Focus System, Normal / Macro (Switch), Continuous AF On / Off, Manual Focus (Ring), One-Shot AF
- Focus areas: 1 point / 3 points / 9 points / Spot

Exposure/metering
- Exposure modes: Program AE, Aperture Priority AE, Shutter Priority AE, Manual, Program Shift (P mode)
- Exposure metering: 1/3 EV step, −2 – +2 EV
- Metering modes: Intelligent Multiple / Center Weighted / Spot

Shutter
- Shutter speed range: 60 – 1/2,000 sec.
- Continuous shooting: 3 frame/s or 2 frame/s. 9 images @ standard OR 5 images @ fine OR unlimited @ 2frame/s

Viewfinder
- Viewfinder: 0.44" Electronic viewfinder (235 K Pixels)

General
- LCD screen: 2.0" (235 K Pixels) Field of View : approx. 100%
- Weight: 674 g (23.8 oz) (Body), 740 g (26 oz) (with Battery and SD Memory Card)

Panasonic Lumix DMC-FZ30 is a bridge digital camera by Panasonic from 2005. It is the successor of the Panasonic Lumix DMC-FZ20. The highest-resolution pictures it records is 8 megapixels.

The camera has a 12× optical zoom Leica lens and OIS (optical image stabilization). The optical zoom can be increased to 19.1× optical zoom by decreasing the picture resolution to 3 megapixels. It uses proprietary lithium-ion batteries and MMC/SD card storage. High-speed SD cards up to 2 GB are supported. There is no storage built into the camera; a memory card is required for all use.

The manual zoom ring allows a smooth progression from 35–420 mm equivalent and silent zooms when recording movies. The camera also includes an "extended optical zoom" system providing greater optical zoom ability when shooting at lower resolutions, giving up to 19.3× optical zoom at 3 MP. Apertures from f/2.8 to f/11 are supported, though the larger apertures are not available at high zoom levels (f/3.7 at full zoom). Shutter speeds range from 60 secs to 1/2000 sec. Auto-focus and a "Macro" autofocus modes are available, or a fluid-damped focus ring can be used. The AF-macro setting can be selected for all camera modes. The camera also has a macro capability (5 cm minimum focal range at 1× zoom).

Wide angle and telephoto lens adapters are available from Panasonic. The wide angle converter shoots at 0.7x magnification (24.5 mm) with f/2.8 brightness, while the telephoto adapter provides 1.7× magnification (714 mm) with f/3.7 aperture. Maximum optical zoom available when taking photos at 3 MP is thus 32.47x (1137.5 mm). It is also possible to achieve greater limits of wide angle/macro and zoom capability with third-party lens converters, which can be attached to the standard 55 mm filter thread.

The FZ30 can also record in TIFF format, and in a RAW format which is supported by Adobe Camera Raw and many other third-party programs. RAW files are recorded in around three seconds with fast SD cards, which is one of the best results among non-DSLR cameras.

Aside from the ability to capture images in RAW format, the FZ30 improves upon its predecessor – the Panasonic Lumix DMC-FZ20 – by adding a screw mount to accept 55 mm lens filters, and contains a fully internal zoom and focus mechanism, meaning the lens does not physically extend or retract outside of the camera housing. This non-extending lens offers the added feature of a reduced startup time: 1 second as opposed to 3–5 for the FZ20. The FZ30 also boasts an improved control layout, with revisions made based on feedback by users of the FZ20. However, the fixed lens added greatly to the size of the camera.

This model has been replaced by the Panasonic Lumix DMC-FZ50. As of 2016, the latest camera in this range is the Lumix FZ330 (designated as the FZ300 in America).

Panasonic received the DIWA Platinum Award for the Lumix DMC-FZ30 on February 14, 2006.

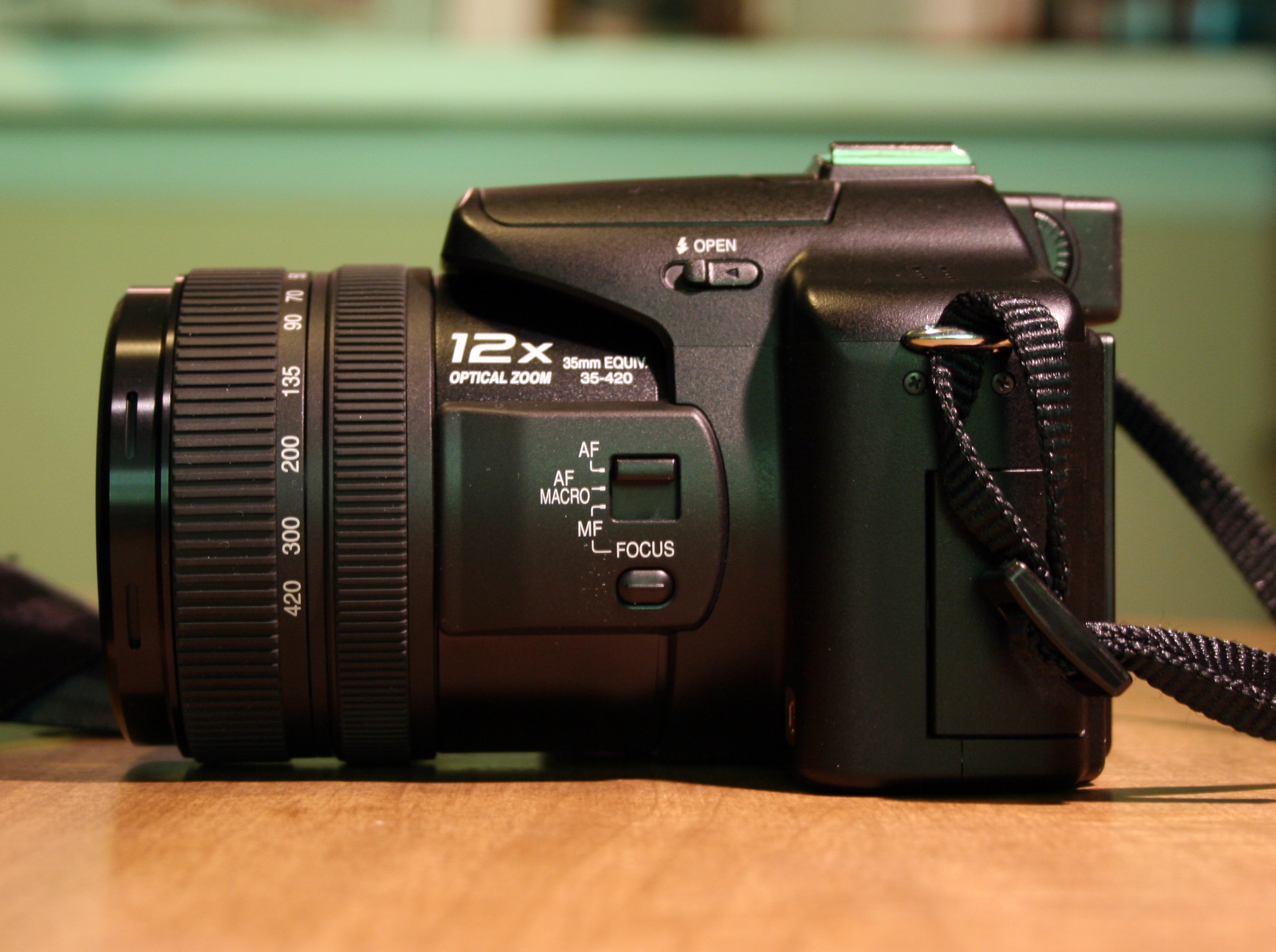

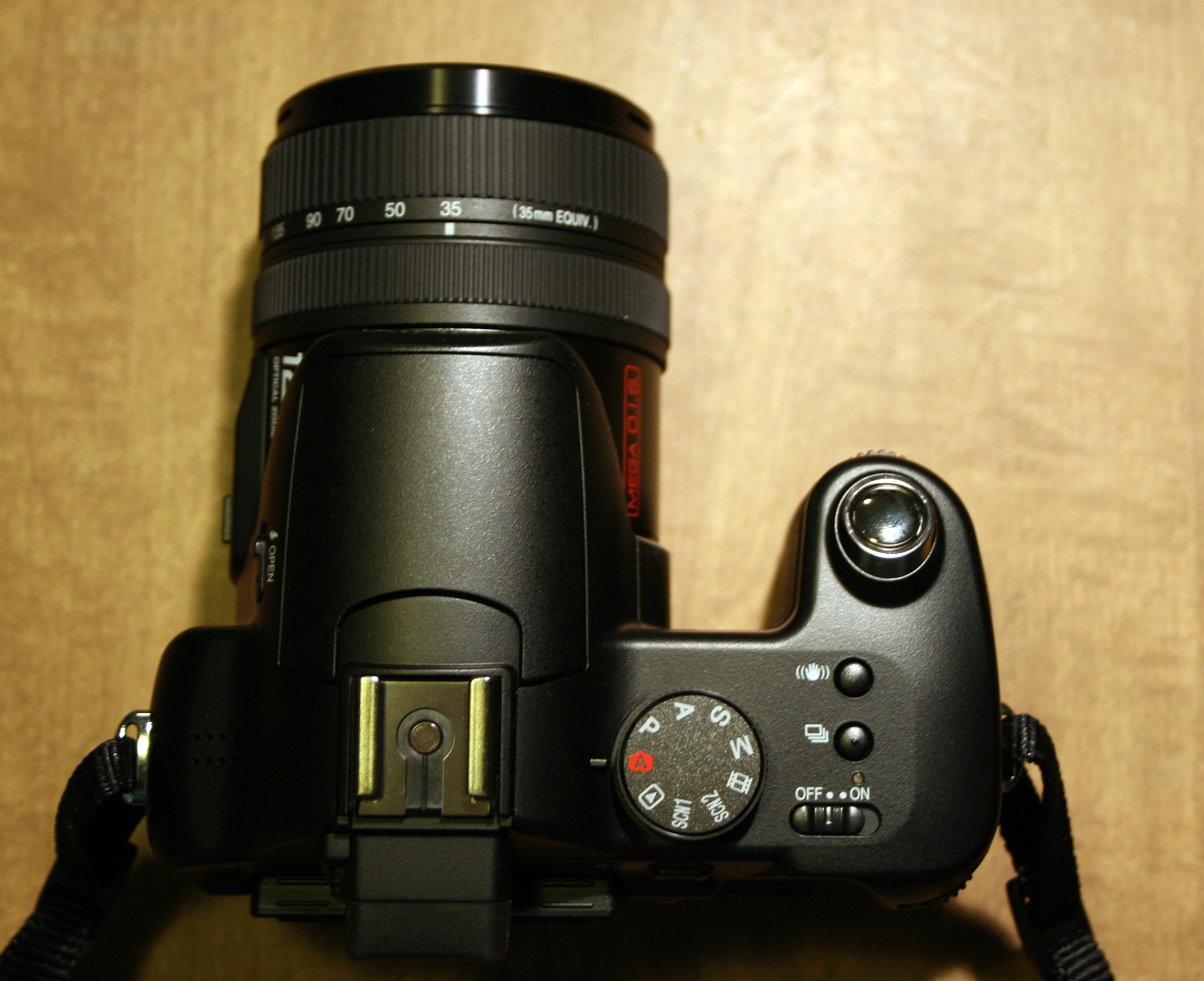
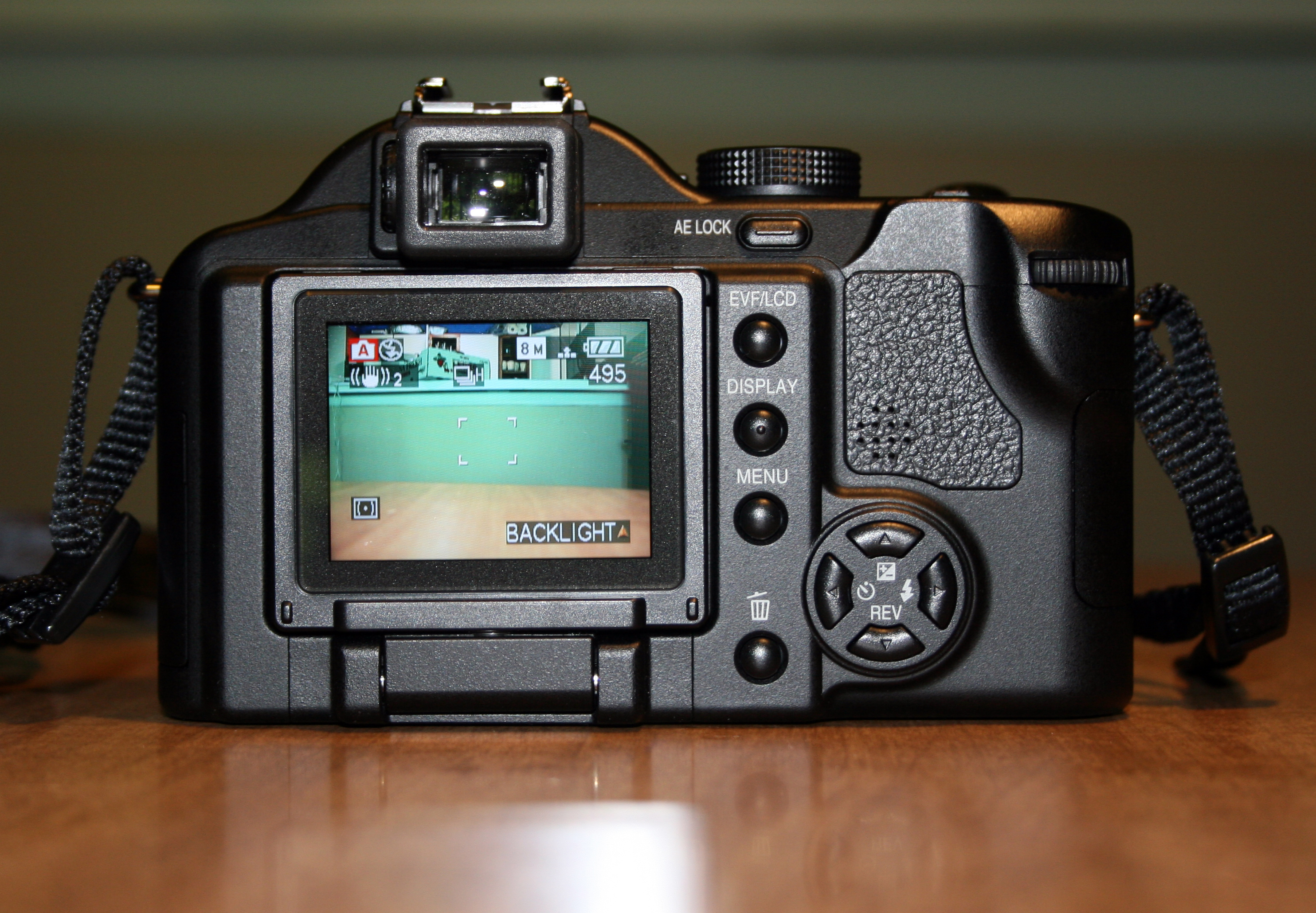

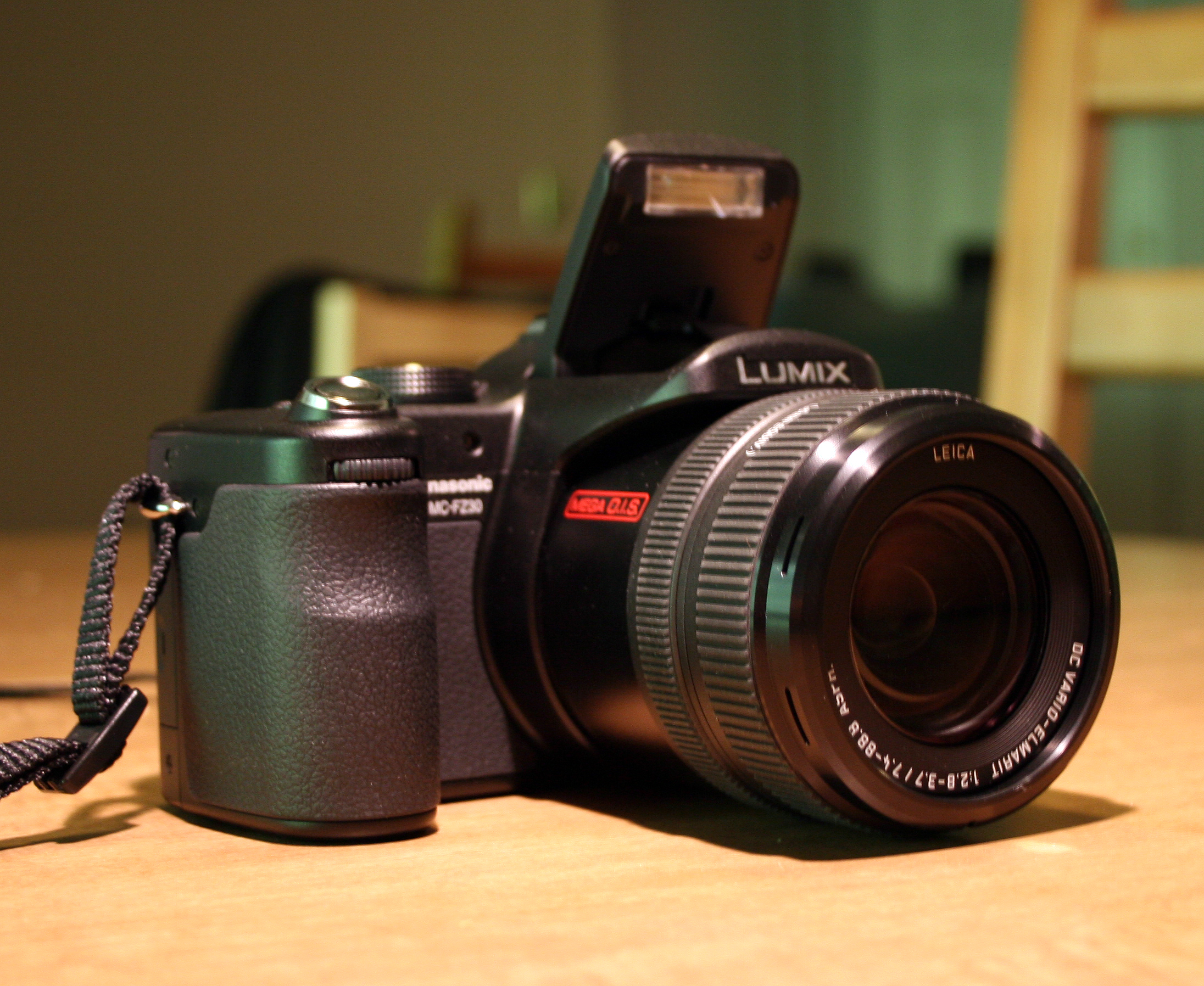

Preceded by Panasonic Lumix DMC-FZ20	Panasonic Lumix DMC-FZ30; 2005	Succeeded by Panasonic Lumix DMC-FZ50
