= Panasonic Lumix DMC-FZ8 =

Digital camera model

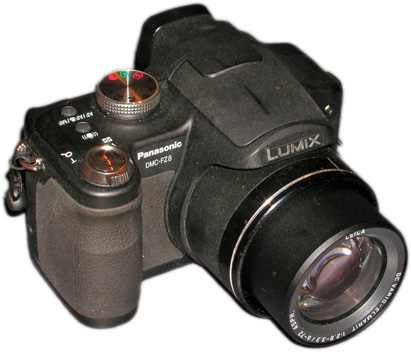

Overview
- Maker: Panasonic Holdings Corporation
- Type: Bridge digital camera

Lens
- Lens: 36-432 mm equiv., F2.8-3.1

Sensor/medium
- Sensor: 1/2.5" CCD
- Maximum resolution: 3072×2304 (7 megapixels)
- Film speed: ISO 100-3200
- Storage media: MMC, SD, SDHC

Focusing
- Focus modes: Automatic or Manual
- Focus bracketing: ±2.0 EV in ⅓ EV steps

Exposure/metering
- Exposure modes: Bulb, Manual, Program, Automatic, Shutter Priority, Aperture Priority
- Metering modes: Matrix, center weighted, spot

Flash
- Flash: Built-in pop up; Range: 1-19.7 feet
- Flash bracketing: ±2.0 EV in ⅓ EV steps

Shutter
- Shutter speed range: 60-1/2000 sec
- Continuous shooting: limited by write speed of SD card, 2-shot burst, 3-shot burst, unlimited burst frame/s

Viewfinder
- Viewfinder: 0.44 in color LCD (188,000 pixels)

Image processing
- White balance: 2 custom modes

General
- Battery: Li-Ion 7.2 V, 710 mAh
- Weight: 10.9 oz (310 g)

The Panasonic Lumix DMC-FZ8 is a 7 megapixel superzoom bridge digital camera made by Panasonic. As with most Panasonic Lumix cameras, it uses a Venus Engine, in this case, the Venus Engine III. It supports the Raw image format and has the same sensor size and zoom level as its predecessor, the Panasonic Lumix DMC-FZ7.

The DMC-FZ8 became available in the United States in February 2007.

== Improvements over DMC-FZ7 ==
The DMC-FZ8 has several improvements.

- 7 megapixel resolution vs. 6 megapixels
- Venus III vs. Venus II processor
- Raw mode
- ISO 100-3200 vs. 100-1600
- SD, MMC, and SDHC for storage vs. SD and MMC
- f/2.8-3.3 Leica zoom lens
- Higher resolution screen and viewfinder, along with other interface tweaks
- 27 MB built in memory

== Other features ==
- Mega O.I.S. (optical image stabilizer) in the lens
- Intelligent ISO Control
- Extra Optical Zoom (digital zoom)
- VGA movie mode in both normal and wide aspect ratio

The camera has a 2.5" color LCD and a color electronic viewfinder, and is available in two colors, black (suffix K) and silver (suffix S).

== Reception ==
In a review, CNET gave the camera 7.5/10 stars, praising the camera's fast zoom lens; joystick and manual controls; optical image stabilization system; compact size; and raw image format. However, they criticized its image quality, misleading optical zoom labeling, and noise issues, as well as the ISO 3200 option being hidden in a specific usage mode, though they noted that may be beneficial to users as the manual specifies that the ISO 3200 would blur much useful detail. Overall, it was described as a decent camera for beginners or intermediate users.

Preceded by Panasonic Lumix DMC-FZ7	Panasonic Lumix DMC-FZ8; ~2007	Succeeded by Panasonic Lumix DMC-FZ18
