= Panasonic Lumix DMC-FZ18 =

Digital camera model

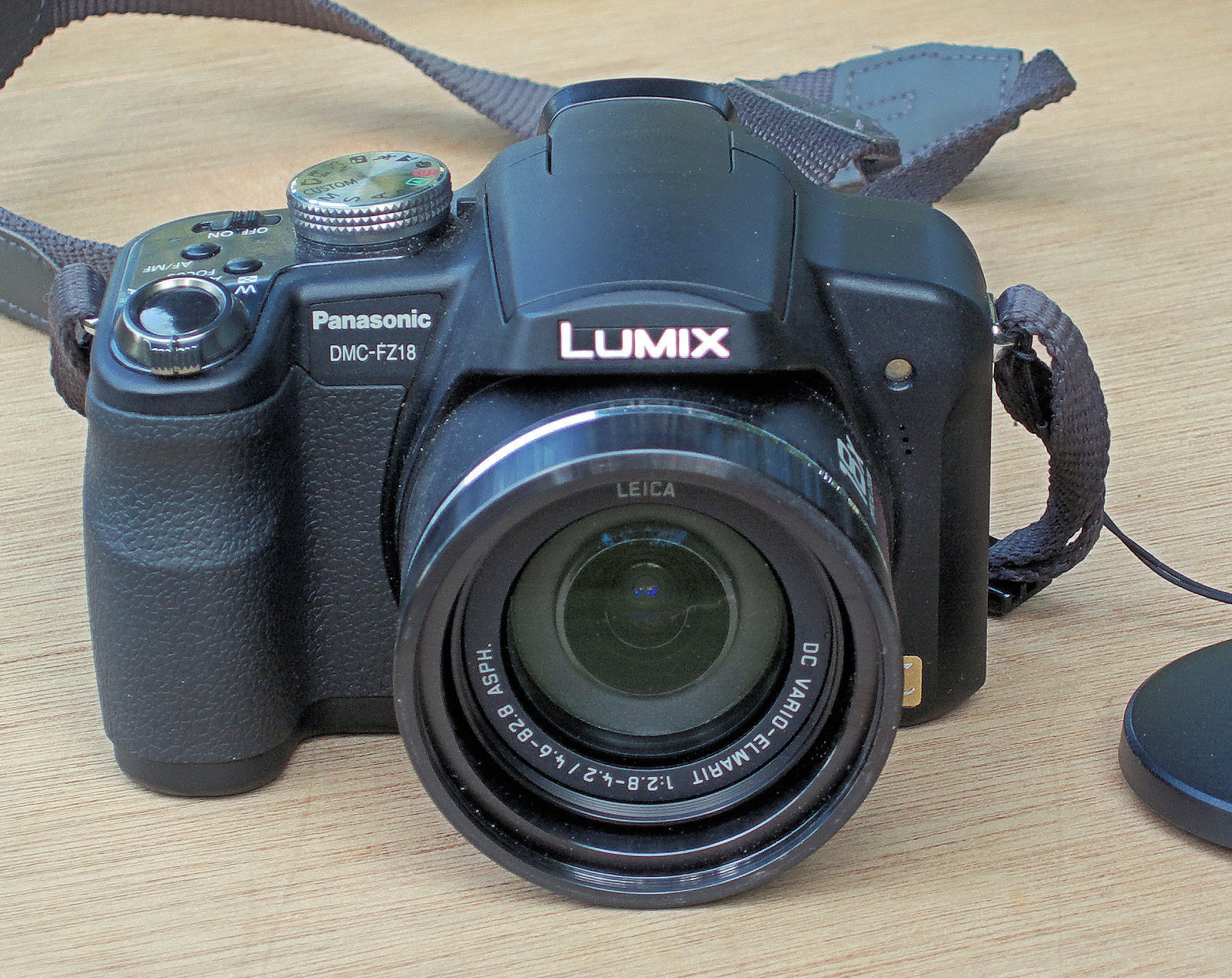

Overview
- Maker: Panasonic Holdings Corporation
- Type: Bridge digital camera

Lens
- Lens: 28-504 mm (18x optical zoom) F2.8-F4.2

Sensor/medium
- Sensor: 1/2.5" CCD
- Maximum resolution: 3264×2448 (10 megapixels)
- Film speed: ISO 100-1600
- Storage media: SD, SDHC, MultiMediaCard, internal

Focusing
- Focus modes: Automatic or Manual
- Focus bracketing: ±2.0 EV in ⅓ EV steps

Exposure/metering
- Exposure modes: Manual, Program, Automatic, Shutter Priority, Aperture Priority
- Metering modes: Intelligent Multiple / Center Weighted / Spot

Flash
- Flash: Built-in pop up; Range: 0.3 - 4 meters
- Flash bracketing: ±2.0 EV in ⅓ EV steps

Shutter
- Shutter speed range: 60-1/2000 sec
- Continuous shooting: 3.0

Viewfinder
- Viewfinder: EVF 0.44 in color LCD (188,000 pixels) or 2.5 in color LCD (230,000 pixels)

Image processing
- White balance: custom modes

General
- Battery: Li-Ion 7.2 V, 710 mAh
- Weight: 15.6 oz (360 g)

The Panasonic Lumix DMC-FZ18 is a superzoom bridge digital camera.

== Main features ==
- 8.1 megapixel resolution
- Fast f/2.8 Leica-branded zoom lens with super 18x zoom range
- Mega O.I.S. (optical image stabilizer) in the lens, reducing blurring by compensating for hand shake
- Intelligent ISO Control
- 4x Digital Zoom
- Multiple modes of operation, including manual modes
- Optional Raw image format
- 480p at 30/10 fps video recording capability
- VGA movie mode in both normal and wide aspect ratio
- Compact size and light weight

As with most Panasonic Lumix cameras it uses a Venus Engine, in this case the Venus Engine III.

The camera has a 2.5" color LCD and a color electronic viewfinder, and is available in two colors, black (suffix K) and silver (suffix S).

The DMC-FZ18 became available in the United States in July 2007. The successor to the FZ18 is the FZ28.

The range of digital superzoom cameras also include models like the Nikon Coolpix P90.

== Reviews ==
- http://www.steves-digicams.com/camera-reviews/panasonic/lumix-dmc-fz1/panasonic-lumix-dmc-fz1-review.html
- http://www.digitalcamerareview.com/camerareview/panasonic-lumix-dmc-fz18-review/
- http://www.dcviews.com/reviews/Panasonic-FZ18/Panasonic-FZ18-review.htm
- http://www.photoxels.com/panasonic-fz18-review.html
- http://www.trustedreviews.com/Panasonic-Lumix-DMC-FZ18-review
- https://web.archive.org/web/20081206173339/http://blog.wired.com/gadgets/2007/08/review-panaso-1.html
- http://gadgets.fosfor.se/panasonic-lumix-fz18-review/
- http://www.imaging-resource.com/PRODS/FZ18/FZ18A.HTM
- http://www.dpreview.com/articles/9332056286/panasonicfz18
- https://gizmodo.com/281632/panasonic-intros-18x-optical-zoom-powerhouse-lumix-dmc-fz18
- http://digicamreview.com/panasonic_lumix_dmc_fz18_review.htm
- http://www.tlc-systems.com/artzen2-0037.htm

Preceded by Panasonic Lumix DMC-FZ8	Panasonic Lumix DMC-FZ18; July 2007 - July 2008	Succeeded by Panasonic Lumix DMC-FZ28
