= Libcamera =

libcamera
- Developer: Laurent Pinchart as lead architect
- Stable release: 0.5.2 (7 August 2025; 4 months ago)
- Repository: git.libcamera.org/libcamera/libcamera.git/
- Written in: C and C++
- Operating system: Linux
- Website: libcamera.org

libcamera is an open-source software library for image signal processors and embedded cameras on Linux distributions such as Android, ChromeOS and Ubuntu. The developers describe libcamera as a continuation of V4L2.

== Background ==
Nokia originally wanted to create a plugin-based software project for camera support, but this was cancelled because they stopped development of Linux-based smartphones.
