= Panasonic Lumix DMC-FZ50 =

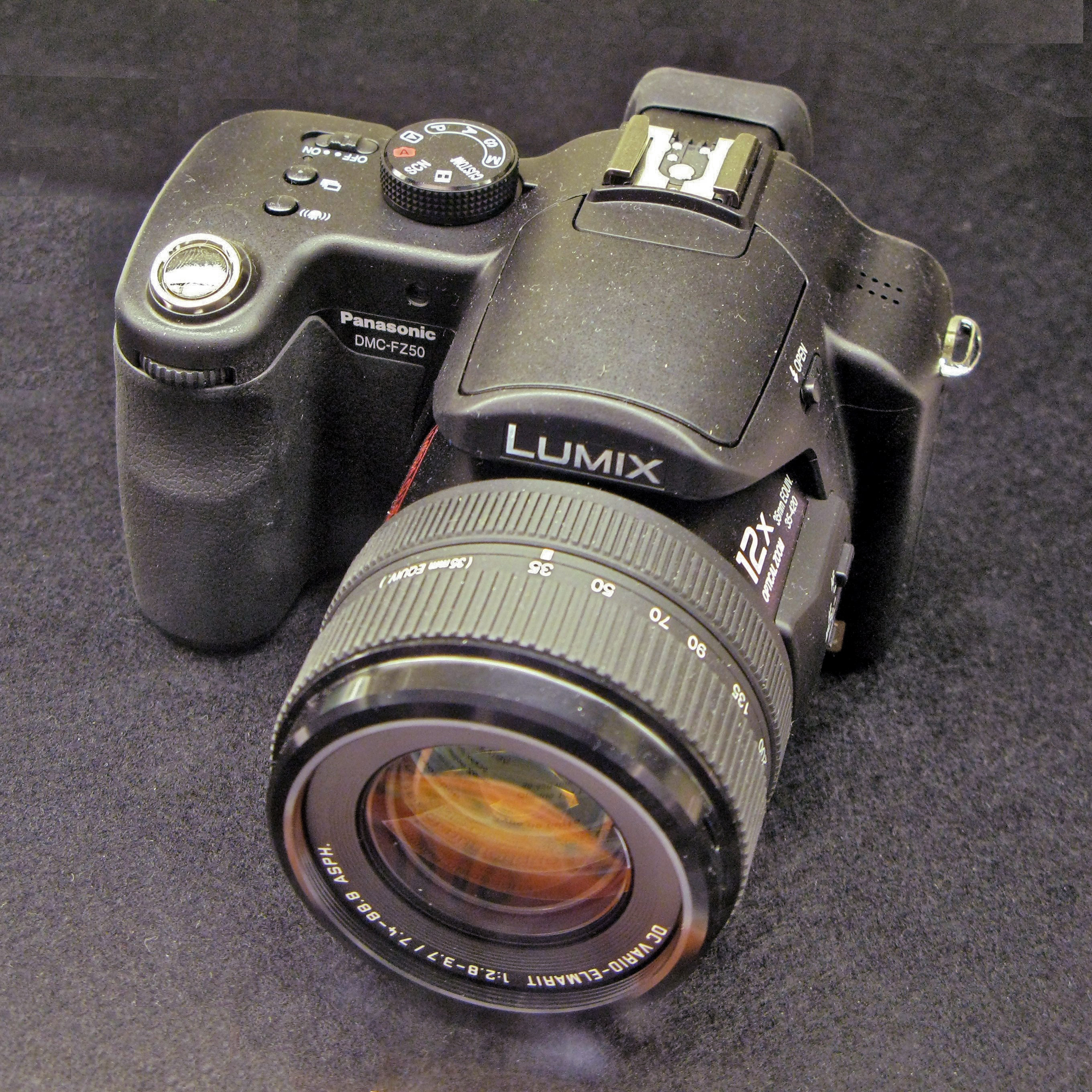

Overview
- Maker: Panasonic Holdings Corporation
- Type: bridge digital camera

Lens
- Lens: Fixed

Sensor/medium
- Sensor: 1/1.8" CCD (7.176 × 5.319 mm)
- Maximum resolution: 3,648 × 2,736 (10.1 million)
- Film speed: Auto / 100 / 200 / 400 / 800 / 1600
- Storage media: Secure Digital (SD), Secure Digital High Capacity (SDHC)

Focusing
- Focus modes: Auto Focus System, Normal / Macro (Switch), Continuous AF On / Off, Manual Focus (Ring), One-Shot AF
- Focus areas: 1 point / 3 points / 9 points / Spot

Exposure/metering
- Exposure modes: Program AE, Aperture Priority AE, Shutter Priority AE, Manual, Program Shift (P mode)
- Exposure metering: 1/3 EV step, −2 – +2 EV
- Metering modes: Intelligent Multiple / Center Weighted / Spot

Shutter
- Shutter speed range: 60 – 1/2,000 sec.
- Continuous shooting: 2 frame/s. 5 images @ standard OR 3 images @ fine OR unlimited @ 2frame/s

Viewfinder
- Viewfinder: 0.44" Electronic viewfinder (235K Pixels)

General
- LCD screen: 2.0" (207K Pixels) Field of View : approx. 100%
- Weight: 668 g (23.6 oz) (Body), 734 g (25.9 oz) (with Battery and SD Memory Card)

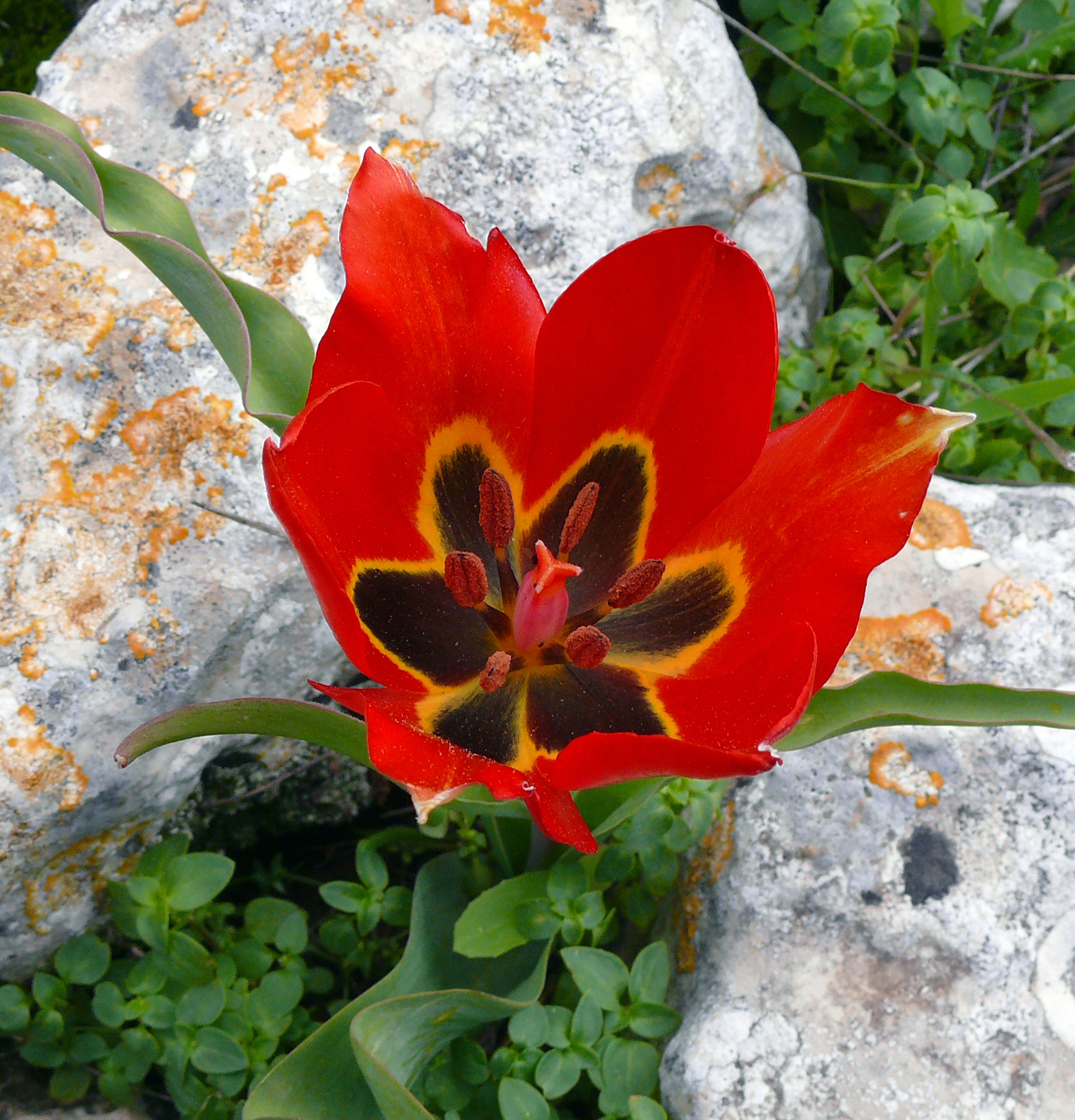
A Tulip photo taken with the DMC-FZ50, without raster graphics editor processing, shows the vivid colors produced by the camera.

Panasonic Lumix DMC-FZ50 is a superzoom bridge digital camera by Panasonic released in circa 2006.

The camera is known for its high-quality optics and effective optical image stabilization system.

== Features ==
Many professional reviews commended it for its excellent pictures at ISO 100. However, it has a reputation for excessively "smeary" noise reduction at higher ISO settings, which can be ameliorated by using the RAW capture mode. It uses proprietary lithium-ion batteries. No storage is built into the camera; an MMC, SD, or SDHC memory card is required. High-speed SD cards up to 2 GB and SDHC cards up to 32 GB are supported.

The camera has many SLR-like handling features — dual control wheels for aperture and shutter speed, manual focus (focus-by-wire), zoom rings and a flash hot shoe. It is among the largest non-SLR cameras, and is positioned at the high end of the bridge-camera market.

Zooming while recording movies is supported since the zoom is manual. The camera also includes an "extended optical zoom" system providing greater optical zoom ability when shooting at lower resolutions, giving up to 19.3× zoom at 3 MP. While Panasonic's camera models with motorized zoom generally implement extended zoom at the end of the optical zoom range as a transition from using the full sensor to just a central crop, the FZ50 does this transition in parallel with the optical zoom, making the mechanically linked zoom appear more sensitive. Compared to cropping in postprocessing, this can be useful for metering and framing.

Apertures from f/2.8 to f/11 are supported, though the largest apertures are not available at high zoom levels (f/3.7 at full zoom). Shutter speeds range from 60 s to 1/2000 s, although shutter speeds faster than 1/1000 s are not available at the widest apertures. Multiple auto-focus (AF) modes are available. The AF-macro setting is available for all camera modes. Macro photography is not outstanding (5 cm minimum focal range at 1× zoom), and the tele-macro capability on the lower-end Panasonic FZ models (the ability to focus down to 1 m at 420 mm) is not present; the FZ50 can only focus down to 2 m at 420 mm. However, the FZ50 is commonly used to record high-magnification macro images with an inexpensive conversion lens; the most commonly used lens for this purpose is the 8-diopter Raynox 250.

The FZ50 has a screw mount to accept 55 mm filters, and is compatible with a wide variety of Panasonic-branded and third-party lens converters that can provide greater wide-angle, telephoto and close-up capabilities.

The FZ50 can record in a RAW format that is supported by Adobe Camera Raw and the free UFRaw plugin for GIMP and many other third-party programs; the camera comes with a special version of Silkypix for conversion. RAW files are recorded in around three seconds with fast SD cards, which is one of the best results among digital single-lens reflex cameras; however, there is no RAW buffer as on many digital SLR's. Unlike its predecessors, the FZ50 does not support TIFF format.

The zoom and focus mechanism is internal: the lens does not physically extend beyond the camera housing when focusing and zooming. Startup is under one second, as the lens does not need to be extended.

== History ==
The predecessor Lumix DMC-FZ30 was a major upgrade of the FZ20 both internally and externally.

The FZ50 differs relatively little from the FZ30. The main differences are:

- Higher resolution 10.1-megapixel CCD
- Venus Engine III processor (with its characteristic unusual noise reduction algorithm)
- 2.0-inch flip-out 207k high resolution LCD (FZ30 has 235k)
- TTL Flash hot-shoe

== See also ==
- Panasonic Lumix DMC-FZ30

Preceded by Panasonic Lumix DMC-FZ30	Panasonic Lumix DMC-FZ50; ~2006	Succeeded by Panasonic Lumix DMC-FZ1000
