= Venus Engine =

Image processing engine for digital cameras

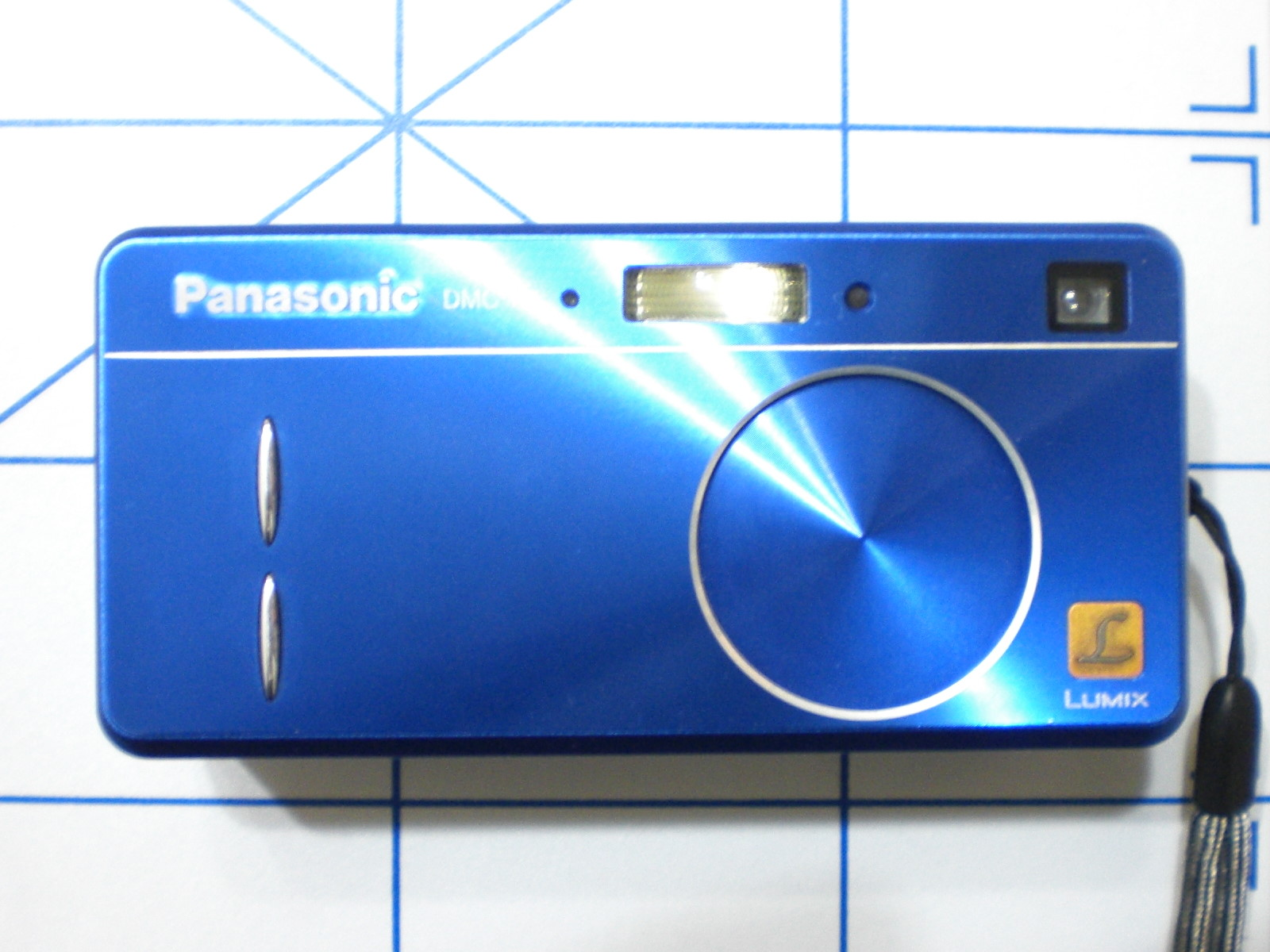
The Lumix DMC-F1 was Panasonic's first digital camera to use the Venus Engine.

The Venus Engine is an image-processing engine for digital cameras. It was developed by the company Panasonic. Almost all of their Lumix cameras use a version of the Venus Engine. It is based on the Panasonic MN103/MN103S.

All image processors operate in four steps. Firstly, they receive data from the CCD sensor. Secondly, they create the Y-color difference signal (image processing). Thirdly, they perform JPEG compression. Finally, they save the image data. Panasonic claims that its VENUS II processing engine performs all of these simultaneously.

== Venus ==
This chip was based on UniPhier products. The image processing engine of the attached RAW image development software is made by Ichikawa Soft Laboratory and outputs images of a trend (SILKYPIX style) different from those developed by the Venus engine in the camera.

== Venus – 2002 ==
This chip was developed based on UniPhier products. The image processing engine of the attached RAW image development software is made by Ichikawa Soft Laboratory, which outputs images with a different trend (SILKYPIX style) from those developed by the Venus engine in the camera. Some of what it aims to achieve are:

- Improvement in resolution in an oblique direction (usually 1.5 times of engine)
- Concurrent processing by multitasking image processing
- Developed to achieve high image quality and high-speed processing.

== Venus II 2004 ==
This chip was limited to the top range models, such as the DMC-FZ7. It was developed mainly aiming at high image quality. After this chip (excluding Venus Engine · Plus) the camera shake correction is hardware processed.

- Enhanced camera shake correction (480 to 4,000 times per second)
- Improvement in resolution in the vertical and horizontal directions (about 10%)
- Improvement of color reproducibility (4 to 12 axis color correction)
- 2DNR strengthening (reduction of dark noise and beautiful skin treatment)
- Magnification chromatic aberration correction
- Free consecutive shooting
- Production process: 130 nm
- Maximum operating frequency: 50 MHz

== Venus Engine Plus – 2005 ==
This chip was developed for mounting in an entry model. Reproducibility (meaning how well it is able to be reproduced) was considered inferior to Venus Engine II, but it realizes power saving and high speed processing comparable to Venus Engine II.

- Power saving, high speed processing, and cost reduction
- Free consecutive shooting

== Venus III – 2005 ==
The Venus III engine used in the Lumix DMC-FZ8 and other cameras claims enhanced noise reduction at high ISO numbers and lower power consumption.

It is a chip realizing power saving based on the Venus Engine II, but they changed high sensitivity shooting. PANASONIC claims LUMIX was the most difficult to do, to hardware processing.

- Energy saving, strengthening NR
- High sensitivity shooting
- High-speed continuous shooting mode compatible
- Add some aberration correction
- Production process: 65 nm
- Maximum operating frequency: 100 MHz

== Venus IV – 2008 ==
Panasonic claims that the 2008 Venus Engine IV gives higher-quality images, and includes more accurate detection and better correction for its Optical Image Stabilizer and Intelligent ISO Control functions than earlier versions. It works at 10.1-megapixel resolution. Panasonic published a detailed comparison of Venus III and IV, claiming better noise response by preserving detail, quick-response shutter release time-lag of around 0.008 second minimum and high power-efficiency for Venus IV.

Reviews of cameras that compare the Venus IV engine to Venus III suggest that the newer engine is better, but the issue of noise reduction techniques losing detail, though improved, remains.

Intelligent ISO sensitivity control is changed to hardware processing. By incorporating the IA(Intelligent Auto) function, the name is also set to Random IA.

- Improvement of NR at high sensitivity shooting (separation process by filter)
- Accuracy improvement of intelligent ISO sensitivity control
- Random IA scene recognition loaded
- Blurring correction installed
- Energy saving, strengthening NR

== Venus HD – 2008 ==
Venus HD is the processing engine used by the first generation Panasonic Lumix DMC-G1 and Panasonic Lumix DMC-GF1 Micro Four Thirds System cameras with large sensor. It supports HDMI output to a high-definition television screen.

- 2 CPU configuration
- Available for AVCHD Lite movie shooting (compatible with MPEG 4 AVC / H.264, high sound quality of Dolby Digital)
- HDMI output compatible
- Highly accurate recognition possible (Advanced recognition processing including personal recognition is possible)
- Increased speed of playback (Up to about four times the maximum when playing one image, up to about 8 times when playing 12 screens, up to about 17 times when playing back 32 screens)
- Power saving (About 15% of Venus Engine IV)
- High speed processing (about 2.4 times the Venus Engine IV ratio)

== Venus V – 2009 ==
As of February 2026 (based on all information available at official Panasonic Lumix Web pages), it appears that the LSI hardware chip-set that Panasonic Lumix refers to as the "Venus Engine V" is (substantially, if not actually) identical to the LSI hardware chip-set that Panasonic Lumix (also) refers to as the "Venus Engine HD" when describing their (released) DMC-G1, as well in all of the current Panasonic Lumix descriptions of the other (to be) released implementations of this image-processing LSI hardware chip-set.

It appears that the Panasonic Lumix marketing department has chosen to refer to this LSI hardware chip-set primarily using the phrase "Venus Engine HD" as a way to draw attention the capabilities of the included "Motion Picture" mode(s) of the upcoming camera models that will contain the LSI hardware chip-set. However, this choice of marketing phraseology does not (according to Panasonic Lumix's information as currently released) appear to indicate any identifiable difference in the LSI hardware chip-set that they have chosen to (also) identify as "Venus Engine V". This use of dual phraseology appears to have generated a degree of (understandable) confusion on the part of consumers and reviewers awaiting the release of several camera models in 2009 that will (in addition to the already released DMC-G1) feature this LSI hardware chip-set. If, in fact, there exists an identifiable difference(s) (on the level of the internal LSI hardware chip-set) between "Venus Engine HD" and "Venus Engine V", Panasonic Lumix has so far failed to identify it (or them).

Why the Panasonic Lumix marketing department (at the United Kingdom location, at least) has chosen to (in the lone case of the DMC-FX40) refer to the LSI hardware chip-set using the alternate descriptive phrase "Venus Engine V" is unclear, since the DMC-FX40 (as is the case with all the other upcoming models with the exception of the already released DMC-G1) is, indeed, advertised as featuring a "Motion Picture" mode that (it appears) will be a very similar implementation to that of all the other upcoming models to be released that will also include this LSI hardware chip-set. Perhaps the reasoning for this is that the Panasonic Lumix marketing department (at the United Kingdom location, at least) is (in part) describing the DMC-FX40 as a "digital still camera".

It is a chip whose cost reduction of Venus engine HD is planned. For that reason, it is enhanced from Venus Engine IV in terms of specifications. 2 CPU configuration, cost reduction, high-speed playback speed, high-precision recognition, power saving, high-speed processing

== Venus VI, Venus Engine HD II – 2010 ==
According to Panasonic, Venus VI adds “Intelligent Resolution”, efficient Face Recognition and an advanced noise reduction system which applies noise reduction (NR) to luminance noise and chromatic noise separately. This engine is used in DMC-ZS5 and ZS10.

There are many things in common, but in each case some functions have been added as a minor change from the previous chip.

- HDMI output compatible
- Available for AVCHD Lite movie shooting (Venus Engine HD II only)
- Equipped with super resolution technology (such as NR at high sensitivity shooting)
- Power saving
- High speed processing
- Accuracy improvement of new camera shake correction (POWER OIS)

== Venus HD II – 2010 ==
According to Panasonic, Venus HD II adds “Intelligent Resolution”, AVCHD Lite at a higher processing speed that utilizes twin CPUs and an advanced noise reduction system that applies noise reduction (NR) to luminance noise and chromatic noise separately. The only difference between Venus HD II and Venus VI are the AVCHD Lite improvements. This engine is used in second-generation Panasonic m43 cameras, the DMC-G2/DMC-G10 and DMC-ZS7/DMC-TZ10.

== Venus FHD – 2010 ==
This engine is used in third-generation Panasonic m43 MILC's cameras, including the DMC-G3, GF2, GF3, GX1 and the GH-2.

Based on the Venus Engine HD II, this chip was developed with the aim of strengthening the movie shooting function and achieving high-speed processing.

- 3 CPU configuration
- Accuracy improvement of ISO sensitivity (High sensitivity shooting equivalent to ISO 10000 is possible)
- 3D image shooting support (mirrorless model only, optional 3D lens required)
- Improvement of image processing capability by new and super resolution technology
- Added intelligent D range control
- HDMI output compatible
- Available for AVCHD movie shooting (1080 / 30p movie shooting possible)
- High speed processing
- Highly accurate recognition possible (Advanced recognition processing including personal recognition is possible)

== Venus VII FHD 2011 ==
This engine is used in fourth-generation Panasonic m43 MILC's cameras, including the DMC-G5, G6, GF7, GX7, GM1, GM5 and the GH-3.

As a minor change of the previous year's chip, added several functions.

- Accuracy improvement of iA (Intelligent Auto Plus installed)
- Built-in creative control
- Cost reduction, high speed processing

== New Venus Engine – 2012 ==
No numbering will be attached after this generation. First adopted in G 5 of Lumix G series.

- Improvement of calculation processing
- Enhanced ISO sensitivity installed
- HDR photography compatible
- AVCHD Progressive movie shooting (1080 / 60p movie shooting possible)

== New Venus Engine – 2013 ==
Suppressing large size noise that was difficult to deal with conventional chips, achieving grain-free image quality. First adopted by G6 of Lumix G series. It is mainly mounted on 4K incompatible models.

- Improvement of calculation processing
- Accompanied with extended ISO 25600 by improving accuracy of extended ISO sensitivity
- Focus peaking function supported

== New Venus Engine – 2014 ==
Venus Engine IX is a quad-core processor first introduced in Panasonic's fifth-generation m43 MILC, the GH4, and later used in the FZ1000, LX100 and DMC-G7. In the GH4 the IX processor allows 4K video, 12 fps continuous shooting and 1080p shooting at bit rates as high as 200 Mbit/s.

First adopted by GH4 of Lumix G series.

- Improvement of arithmetic processing by 4 CPU adoption
- 4K movie shooting supported (4K / 30p movie shooting is possible)
- New multi process NR
- New gamma correction processing
- Diffraction correction processing
- Broadband contour enhancement processing (broadband aperture filter)
- 3D color control
- HDR processing, RAW development compatible
- Expansion ISO sensitivity 100 installed
- Space recognition technology (DFD * technology) installed

On May 18, 2015 Panasonic introduced the G7, which shoots 4K Ultra HD (3840*2160, 24/25/30p) and uses the Venus IX ISP.

== New Venus Engine – 2022 ==
A new Venus Engine image processor is featured on the Lumix GH6, which allows shooting at 14 frames per second with autofocus locked. Panasonic claims the latest Venus Engine is nearly twice as powerful as previous generations.

== See also ==
- Lumix
- EXPEED
