= Panasonic Lumix DMC-FZ20 =

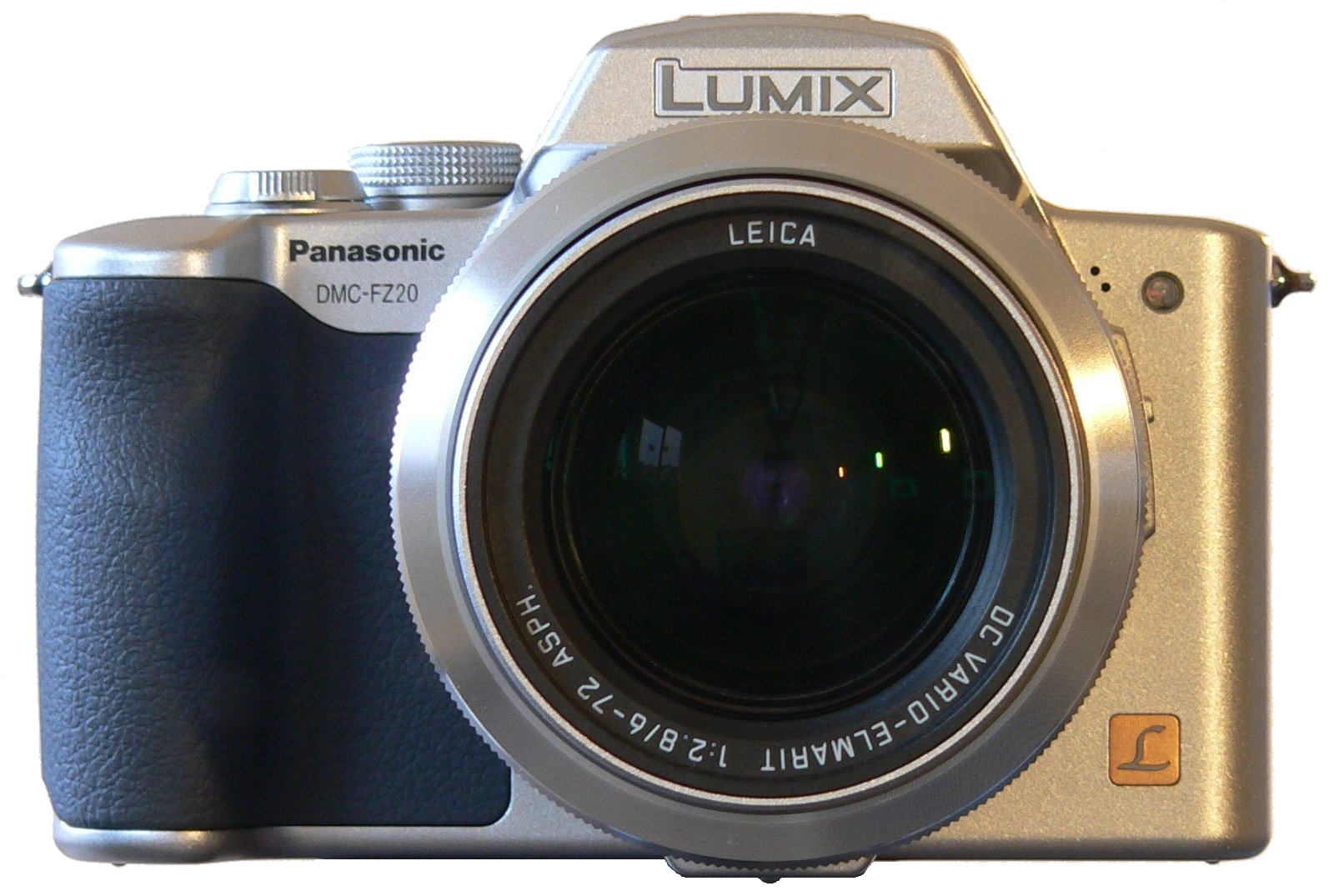

Overview
- Maker: Panasonic Holdings Corporation
- Type: Bridge digital camera
- Released: 2004

Lens
- Lens: Fixed

Sensor/medium
- Sensor: CCD
- Maximum resolution: 2,560 × 1,920 (4.9 million)
- Film speed: Auto / 80 / 100 / 200 / 400
- Storage media: Secure Digital

Focusing
- Focus modes: Auto Focus System, Normal / Macro (Dial), Continuous AF On / Off, Manual Focus (Ring), One-Shot AF
- Focus areas: 1 point / 3 points / 9 points / Spot

Exposure/metering
- Exposure modes: Program AE, Aperture Priority AE, Shutter Priority AE, Manual, Program Shift (P mode)
- Exposure metering: 1/3 EV step, -2 to +2 EV
- Metering modes: Intelligent Multiple/Center Weighted / Spot

Shutter
- Shutter speed range: 8 – 1/2,000 s
- Continuous shooting: 3 frame/s or 2 frame/s. 7 images @ standard OR 4 images @ fine OR unlimited @ 2 frame/s

Viewfinder
- Viewfinder: Electronic viewfinder

General
- LCD screen: 2.0" (130,000 pixels) Field of View : approx. 100%
- Weight: 520 g (18 oz) (1.14 lb) (Body), 556 g (1.23 lb) (with battery and SD memory card)

Panasonic Lumix DMC-FZ20 is a 2004 superzoom bridge digital camera by Panasonic. It is the successor of the FZ10. The highest-resolution pictures it records are 2,560 by 1,920 pixels (4.9 megapixels). It has a polycrystalline, thin-film transistor, liquid crystal display and EVF (electronic view finder). It records to Secure Digital media. The camera also has a microphone. The camera's dimensions are 127.6 mm (5.02 inches) in width, 87.2 mm (3.43 inches) in height, and 106.2 mm (4.18 inches) in depth. Its mass is 520 g (18.3 ounces).

This camera is known for its Leica lens with "Mega OIS" optical image stabilisation. It has a 12× optical zoom, often said to be equal to a 400 mm lens, which can stay f/2.8 for the entire zoom range. There are full manual controls too. Optional lenses are available to double the focal length or for wide-angle view.

Modes include full automatic, aperture priority, shutter priority, full manual, macro (from 5 centimetres on), film, and sequence of shots. Film is recorded at 320×240 px resolution in mJPEG format and playable in QuickTime.

Files can be stored in TIFF and two levels of JPEG, either a high quality or lower quality. The camera can be set to save both a JPEG and TIFF file.

The lens itself extends from the barrel of the camera and cannot have filters or lens hoods attached directly to it. A special adapter is required which allows 72 mm filters and the included lens hood to be attached to the barrel of the camera. Alternatively, adapters are available from third-party manufacturers that allow less expensive 62 mm filters to be used.

Its successors are the FZ30, announced on July 20, 2005, and the FZ50, announced around a year later.

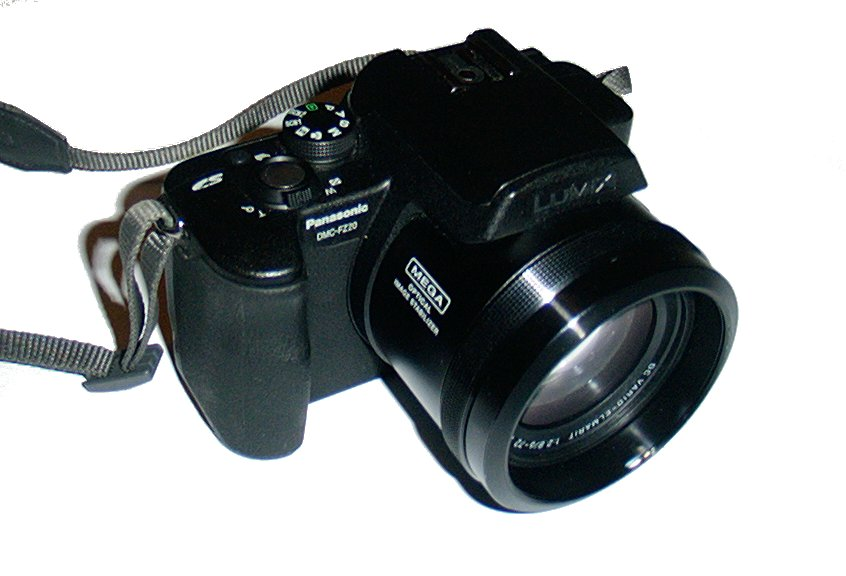

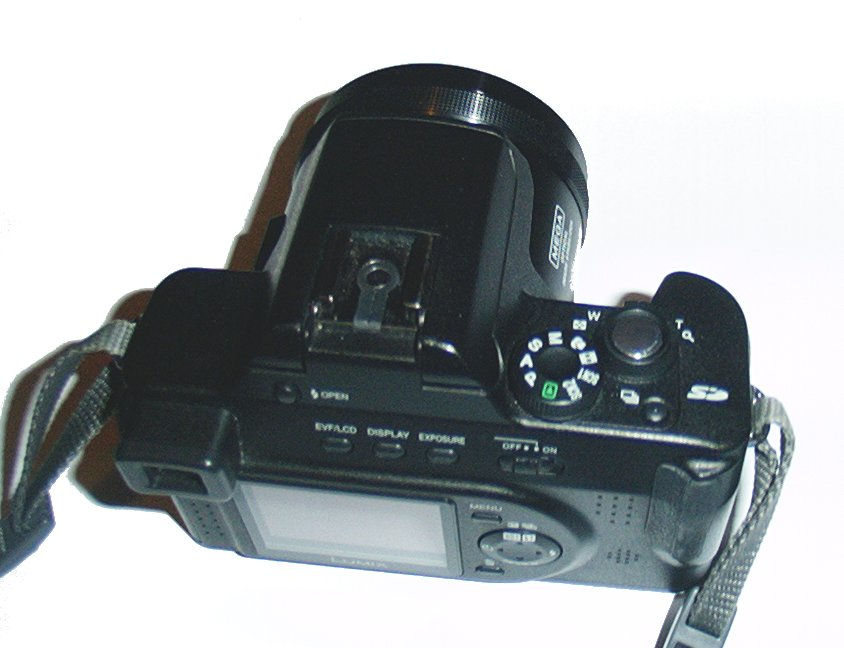

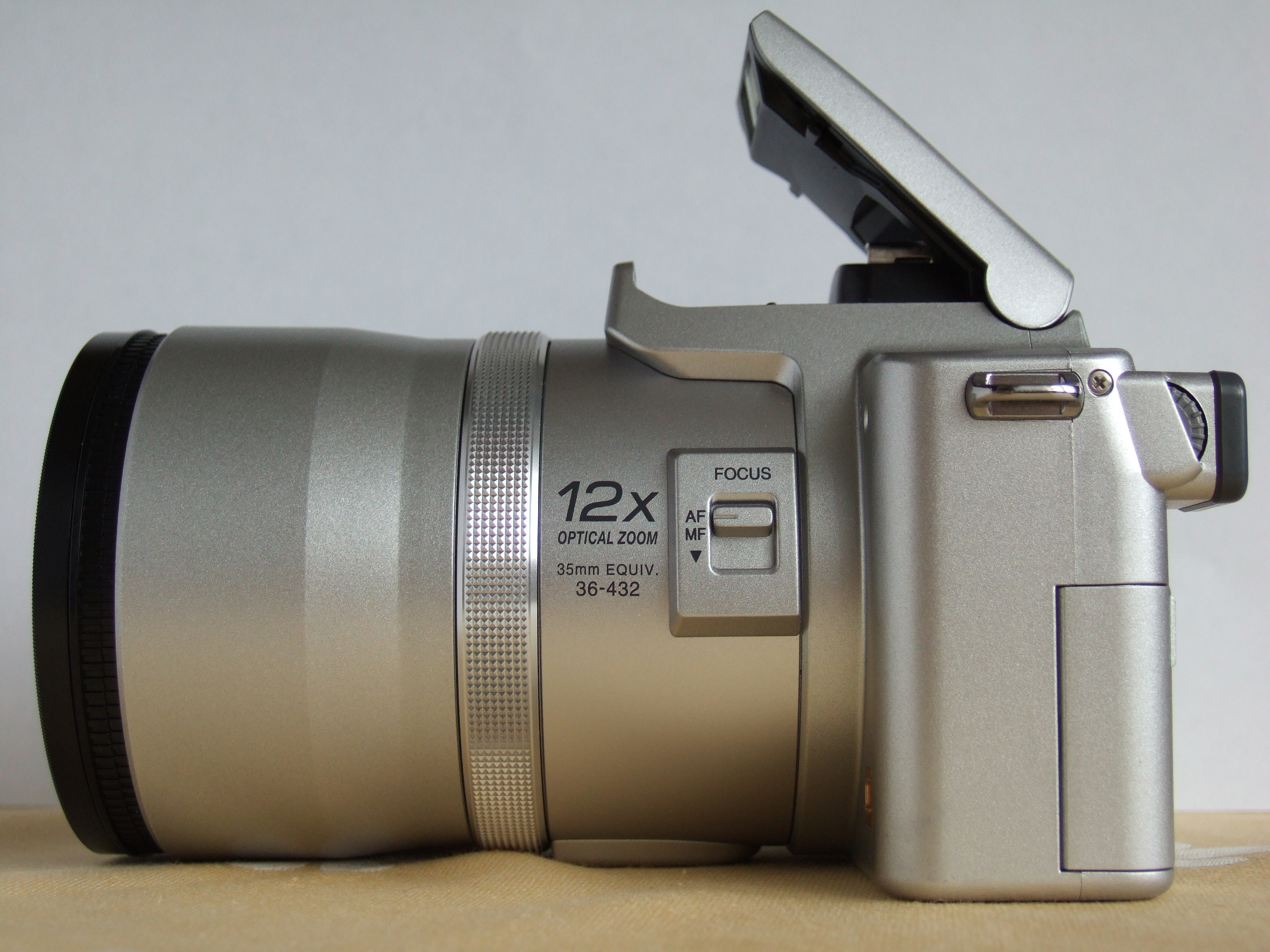

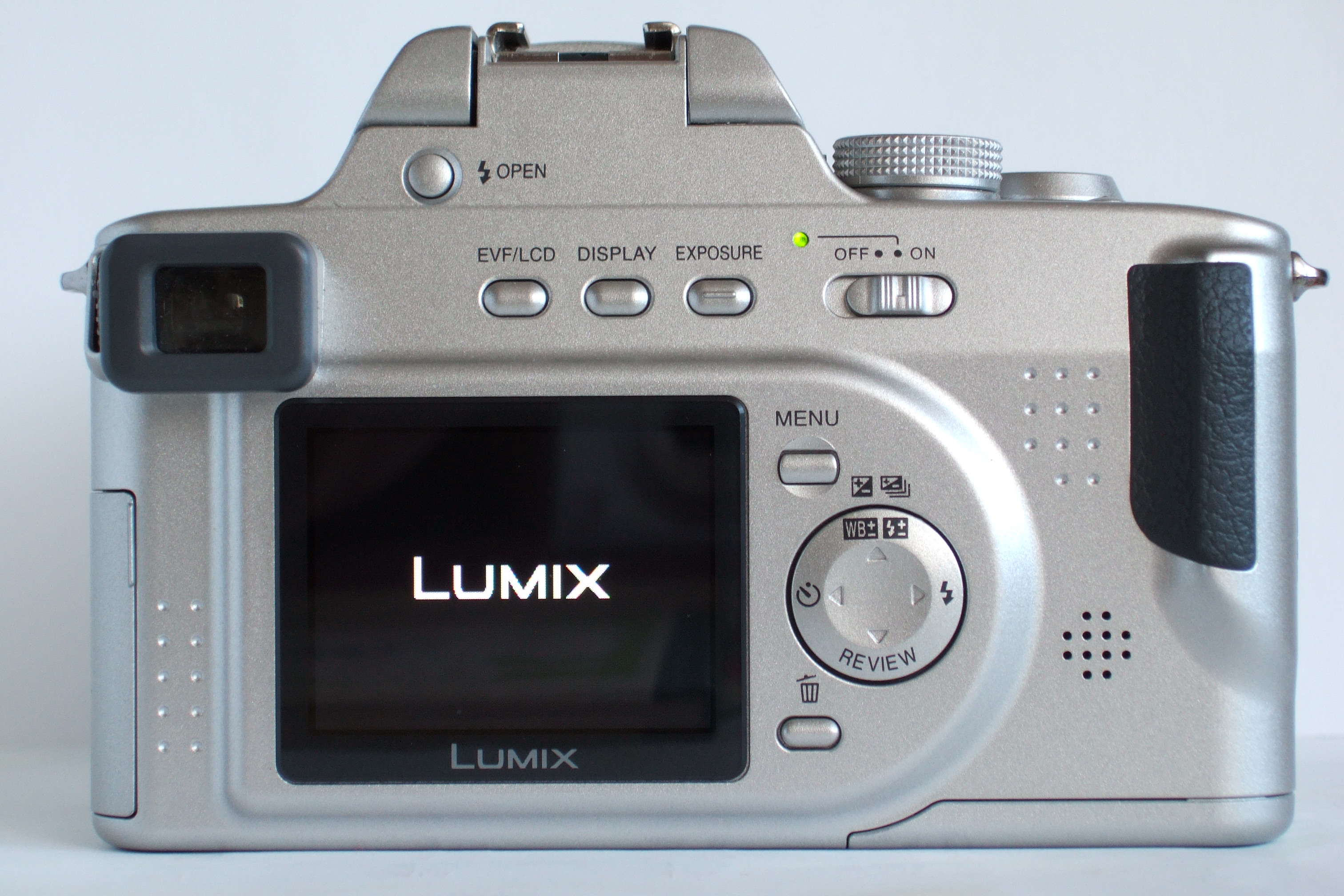

== See also ==
- List of bridge cameras

Preceded by Panasonic Lumix DMC-FZ10	Panasonic Lumix DMC-FZ20; 2004	Succeeded by Panasonic Lumix DMC-FZ30
