= MN103 =

Microprocessor designed for embedded use

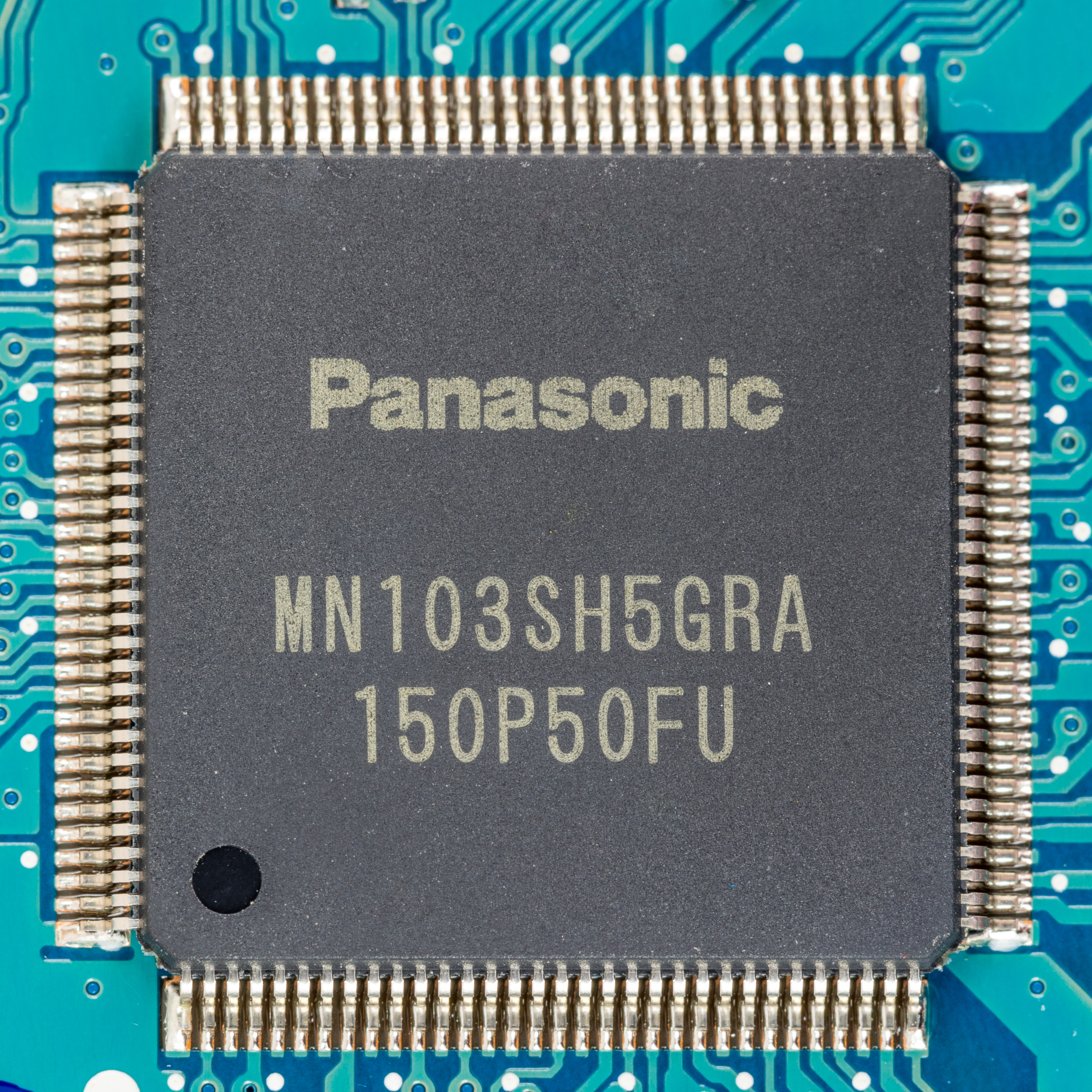
Panasonic MN103SH5GRA

The MN103 (also called MN10300 or AM33) is a 32-bit microprocessor series developed by Matsushita Electric Industrial, now Panasonic Corporation. Most variants include a media processor, working as an image processor or video processor. It is used in digital cameras, set-top boxes and DVD players.

It was supported by the Linux kernel from version 2.6.25 until version 4.16.

It was also supported by Windows CE.

A newer, enhanced version is the MN103S.
