= GH4 =

GH4 may refer to:

- Guitar Hero World Tour
- Panasonic Lumix DMC-GH4, a digital camera with 4K resolution video recording capability
