= Gh3 =

GH3 may refer to the

- music video game Guitar Hero III: Legends of Rock
- mirrorless interchangeable lens camera Panasonic Lumix DMC-GH3
