= AVCHD =

File-based format for the digital recording and playback of high-definition video

AVCHD logo

AVCHD (Advanced Video Coding High Definition) is a file-based format for the digital recording and playback of high-definition video. It is H.264 and Dolby AC-3 packaged into the MPEG transport stream, with a set of constraints designed around camcorders.

Developed jointly by Sony and Panasonic, the format was introduced in 2006 primarily for use in high definition consumer camcorders. Related specifications include the professional variants AVCCAM and NXCAM.

Favorable comparisons of AVCHD against HDV and XDCAM EX solidified perception of AVCHD as a format acceptable for professional use. Both Panasonic and Sony released the first consumer AVCHD camcorders in spring of 2007. Panasonic released the first AVCHD camcorder aimed at the professional market in 2008, though it was nothing more than the (by then discontinued) FLASH card consumer model rebadged with a different model number.

In 2011 the AVCHD specification was amended to include 1080-line 50-frame/s and 60-frame/s modes (AVCHD Progressive) and stereoscopic video (AVCHD 3D). The new video modes require double the data rate of previous modes.

AVCHD and its logo are trademarks of Sony and Panasonic.

== Overview ==
File organization on Panasonic and Canon solid-state AVCHD camcorders

For video compression, AVCHD uses the H.264/MPEG-4 AVC standard, supporting a variety of standard, high definition, and stereoscopic (3D) video resolutions. For audio compression, it supports both Dolby AC-3 (Dolby Digital) and uncompressed linear PCM audio. Stereo and multichannel surround (5.1) are both supported.

Aside from recorded audio and video, AVCHD includes many user-friendly features to improve media presentation: menu navigation, simple slide shows and subtitles. The menu navigation system is similar to DVD-Video, allowing access to individual videos from a common intro screen. Slide shows are prepared from a sequence of AVC still frames, and can be accompanied by a background audio track. Subtitles are used in some camcorders to timestamp the recordings.

Audio, video, subtitle, and ancillary streams are multiplexed into an MPEG transport stream and stored on media as binary files. Usually, memory cards and HDDs use the FAT file system, while optical discs employ UDF or ISO 9660.

At the file system level, the structure of AVCHD is derived from the Blu-ray Disc specification, but is not identical to it. In particular, it uses legacy "8.3" file naming convention, while Blu-ray Discs utilize long filenames (this may be caused by the fact that FAT implementations utilizing long file names are patented by Microsoft and are licensed on a per unit sold basis). Another difference is location of the BDMV directory, which contains media files. On a DVD-based camcorder the BDMV directory is placed at the root level, as on the Blu-ray Disc. On the HDD-based Canon HG10 camcorder the BDMV directory is located in the AVCHD directory, which is placed at the root level. Solid-state Panasonic and Canon camcorders nest the AVCHD directory inside the PRIVATE directory. Following a standard agreed upon by many still camera manufacturers, solid-state camcorders have a root-level DCIM directory for still images.

AVCHD is compatible with the Blu-ray format and can be authored without re-encoding on Blu-rays or DVDs, though not all Blu-ray Disc players are compatible with AVCHD video authored on DVD media, a format known as AVCHD disc.

AVCHD recordings can be transferred to a computer by connecting the camcorder via the USB connection. Removable media like SDHC and Memory Stick cards or DVDs can be read on a computer directly. Copying files from an AVCHD camcorder or from removable media can be performed faster than from a tape-based camcorder, because the transfer speed is not limited by realtime playback.

Just as editing DVCPRO HD and HDV video once demanded an expensive high-end computer, AVCHD editing software requires powerful machines. Compared to HDV, AVCHD requires 2-4 times the processing power for realtime playback, placing a greater burden on the computer's CPU and graphics card. Improvements in multi-core computing and graphics processor acceleration bring AVCHD playback to mainstream desktops and laptops.

== Video formats ==
An example of interlace combing

AVCHD supports a variety of video resolutions and scanning methods, which was further extended with the 2011 amendment of the specification. The licensing body of the specification defines a variety of labels for products compliant with specific features.

Most AVCHD camcorders support only a handful of the video and audio formats allowed in the AVCHD standard.

=== Interlaced video ===
AVCHD supports both standard definition (AVCHD-SD) and high definition (AVCHD 1080i) interlaced video. AVCHD 1080i is available on most AVCHD camcorders. For some models this is the only recording mode offered.

AVCHD-SD is used in the shoulder-mount Panasonic HDC-MDH1, as well as on its North American AG-AC7 cousin. A successor model – the AG-AC8, is also capable of recording in AVCHD-SD mode. Several models from JVC like the consumer camcorders GZ-HM650, GZ-HM670 and GZ-HM690 as well as the professional camcorder JVC GY-HM70 can record AVCHD-SD video. AVCHD-SD is not compatible with consumer DVD players, because it employs AVC video encoding instead of MPEG-2 Part 2. AVCHD-SD can be played on a Blu-ray Disc player without re-encoding.

Interlaced video had been originally designed for watching on a cathode-ray tube television set. Material recorded for interlaced presentation may exhibit combing or ghosting when it is rescaled, filmed out or watched on a computer or another progressive-scan device without proper deinterlacing.

Some AVCHD 1080i camcorders can capture progressive video and record it within interlaced stream borrowing techniques from television industry. In particular, Progressive segmented frame (PsF) is utilized in some Panasonic (25p Digital Cinema), Canon (PF25, PF30) and Sony camcorders. The 2:3 pulldown technique is used in some 60 Hz versions of Canon (PF24) and Panasonic (24p Digital Cinema) camcorders for recording 24-frame/s progressive video. Most editing tools treat progressive video recorded within an interlaced stream as interlaced, though some editing systems and most standalone Blu-ray Disc players are capable of recognizing the pulldown pattern to recover the original frames using the process known as inverse telecine.

=== Progressive-scan video ===
Native Progressive logo (Canon)

Since the very beginning, the AVCHD specification had supported 720-line progressive recording mode at frame rates of 24 and 60 frames/s for 60 Hz models and 50 frames/s for 50 Hz models. Frame rates of 25 frames/s and 30 frames/s are not directly available in 720p mode, but can be simulated with frame repeating, when every frame is either repeated twice or a special flag in the video stream instructs a decoder to play every frame twice to adhere to output rate of 50 or 60 frames/s.

Many of the digital compact cameras made by Panasonic, such as the DMC-ZS3/DMC-TZ7, DMC-FT1, DMC-FZ35/DMC-FZ38, and DMC-ZS-7/TZ-10 offer 720p video recording with effective frame rate of 25 or 30 frames/s in a format called AVCHD Lite (see below).

Until the advent of AVCHD Progressive mode, native progressive-scan video for 1080-line resolution had been available only in 24 frames/s variant. In 2010, Panasonic introduced a new lineup of consumer AVCHD camcorders with 1080-line 50p/60p progressive-scan mode (frame rate depending on region). Panasonic advised that not all players that support AVCHD playback could play 1080-line 50p/60p video. In 2011, this mode was officially included into the AVCHD specification as part of 2.0 addendum, and has been called AVCHD Progressive. This mode uses the same AVCHD folder structure and container files for storing video, with the maximum bit rate of 28 Mbit/s. In 2011, Sony introduced consumer and professional AVCHD models capable of AVCHD Progressive recording. In 2012 JVC announced the GY-HMQ10 model, which also can record AVCHD Progressive video.

== Audio formats ==
Most AVCHD camcorders record audio using Dolby Digital (AC-3) compression scheme. Stereo and multichannel audio is supported. Audio data rate can range from 64 kbit/s to 640 kbit/s. In practice, data rates of 256 kbit/s and 384 kbit/s have been observed.

Some professional models allow recording uncompressed linear PCM audio.

== Media ==
AVCHD specification allows using recordable DVDs, memory cards, non-removable solid-state memory and hard disk drives as recording media.

=== DVD ===
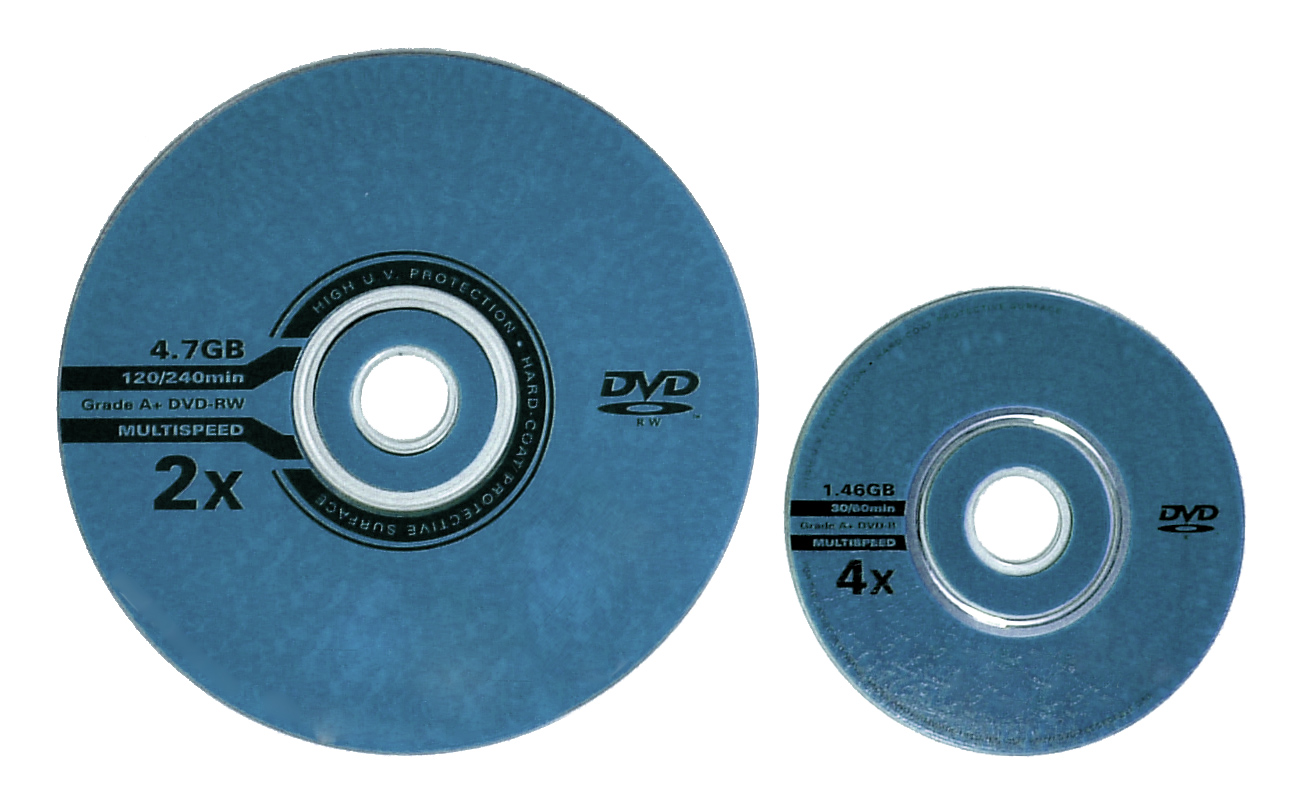
Conventional 12 cm disc (left) compared to 8 cm disc (right)

When the AVCHD standard was first announced, recordable DVD was the only recording medium. To reduce camcorder size, manufacturers opted for an 8 cm disc, sometimes called miniDVD. Recording capacity of an 8 cm disc ranges from 1.4 GB for a single-sided single layer disc to 5.2 GB for a double-sided double layer disc.

Pros:

- DVDs are familiar to most consumers, thus considered user-friendly.
- Recordable DVDs are relatively cheap.
- Recorded disc can be played back in most Blu-ray Disc players.
- Discs can be used for long-term storage of recorded video.

Cons:

- Some argue that the longevity of recordable DVDs may be shorter than expected.
- Rewritable DVDs cost more than write-once discs.
- DVDs must be "finalized" to play back on set-top players (though DVD-RWs can be unfinalized again).
- Double-layer recording is less robust than single-layer recording.
- To use both sides of a double-sided disc it must be flipped over, because camcorders have pickup from one side only.
- AVCHD DVDs can only be played back on DVD/Blu-ray players specifically designed to do so.
- The AVCHD specification limits data rate for DVD-based AVCHD camcorders to 18 Mbit/s, but no DVD-based AVCHD camcorder manufactured to date is capable of recording at data rate higher than 12 Mbit/s (Canon, Sony) or 13 Mbit/s (Panasonic).
- A single-sided single-layer 8 cm DVD can fit only 15 minutes of video at 12 Mbit/s, 14 minutes at 13 Mbit/s.
- DVD pickup mechanism is very susceptible to vibration.
- 8 cm DVDs cannot be used in many slot-loading drives and may even damage the drive.

As the capacity of memory cards grew and their price dropped, DVDs use for recordable media declined. No DVD-based AVCHD camcorders have been produced since 2008. While DVDs are no longer used for acquisition, they remain popular as distribution media. Many authoring programs offer "AVCHD" profile for recording high definition video on a DVD. Such AVCHD discs are incompatible with regular DVD-Video players, but play in many Blu-ray Disc players. A conventional single-layer 12 cm DVD can store 35 minutes of video recorded at the maximum bit rate the AVCHD specification allows for DVD media—18 Mbit/s.

=== Hard disk drive ===
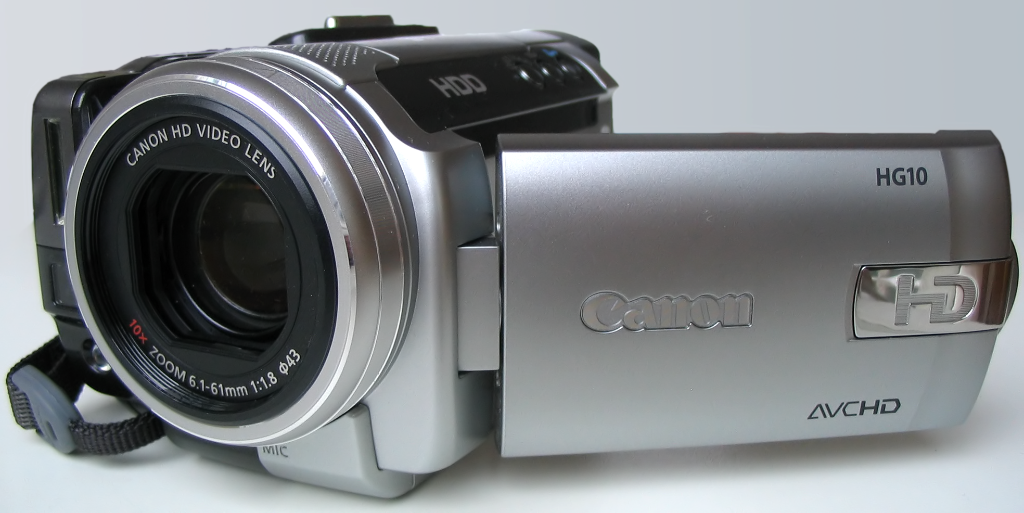
Canon HG10 HDD-based AVCHD camcorder

A hard disk drive was added as an optional recording medium to AVCHD specification shortly after the new video standard had been announced. Presently, capacity of built-in HDDs ranges from 30 GB to 240 GB.

Pros:

- Higher capacity than other media types, which allows for longer continuous recording.

Cons:

- Sensitive to atmospheric pressure. The HDD may fail if the camcorder is used at altitudes above 3,000 metres (9,800 ft).
- Vulnerable to mechanical shock or fast movement.
- All HDD-based AVCHD camcorders employ non-removable disks. To transfer video to a computer the camcorder must be connected with a USB cable. Most camcorders require using an AC power adapter for this operation.
- The sound of moving magnetic heads may be heard in the recorded video when recording in quiet environment.
- Replacing a damaged HDD requires disassembling a camcorder and cannot be done by a consumer.

=== Solid-state memory card ===
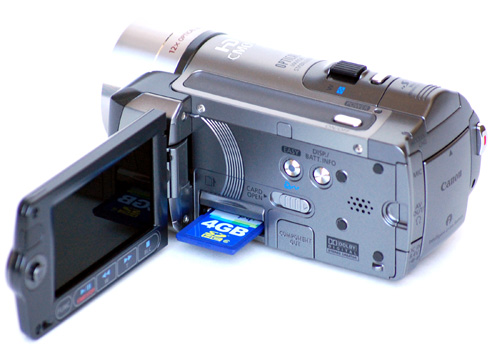
Canon HF100 camcorder with a partially inserted Secure Digital card.

Many AVCHD camcorders employ Secure Digital or "Memory Stick" memory cards as removable recording media. Solid-state memory cards offer rewritable storage in a compact form factor with no moving parts.

Panasonic and Sony chose removable flash memory as the sole type of recording media in their professional AVCHD lineups, specifically AVCCAM and NXCAM.

Until 2010, Sony insisted on usage of its own memory card format - Memory Stick. Since 2010, Sony has allowed using both Memory Stick as well as Secure Digital cards in its consumer and professional camcorders. Panasonic as well as other manufacturers of AVCHD camcorders use Secure Digital cards as removable flash media. Most models accept Secure Digital High Capacity cards (SDHC), while some models are also compatible with Secure Digital Extended Capacity (SDXC) cards, which offer higher transfer speed and capacity.

Pros:

- Compact and lightweight.
- Does not require time for spin-up and initialization.
- Not vulnerable to magnetic fields.
- Can withstand a wider range of air pressure, humidity and vibration than HDDs.
- Can be easily backed up to DVD for viewing and for long-term archiving.
- Can store mixed media content, including still images like snapshot photos and still-frame captures.
- The recording section contains no moving parts, thus operation is almost silent; also a camera can be made more compact and less prone to mechanical damage in case of being dropped.
- Most new computers, many TV sets and Blu-ray Disc players, as well as many personal portable media players have built-in card readers and can play AVCHD video directly from a card.

Cons:

- More expensive per minute of recording than a built-in HDD or DVD media.
- Not reliable for long-term storage and may wear out more rapidly than expected, especially the cards made with MLC technology as opposed to cards using SLC technology.
- Vulnerable to electrical damage, such as static discharge, and too high temperature.
- A bad memory card can cause data corruption, causing loss of one or more clips.

=== Non-removable solid-state memory ===
Some AVCHD camcorders come with built-in solid-state memory either as a sole media, or in addition to other media.

Pros:

- Allows making a camcorder smaller if no other media is used.
- Always available for recording, in case other type of media is full or missing.

Cons:

- Because recording media is non-removable, the recorded images should be backed up either to a computer with a USB cable to transfer video or (if the camera accepts them) to another FLASH card or even a DVD or Blu-ray through an externally connected burner. Usage of an AC power adapter may be required.
- Non-removable media cannot be shared, sent or stored separately of the camcorder.
- If damaged or worn out, non-removable media cannot easily be replaced like a memory card.

== Branding ==
Panasonic and Sony developed several brand names for their professional as well as simplified versions of AVCHD.

=== AVCHD Lite ===
AVCHD Lite is a subset of AVCHD format announced in January 2009, which is limited to 720p60, 720p50 and 720p24 and does not employ Multiview Video Coding. AVCHD Lite cameras duplicate each frame of 25fps/30fps video acquired by camera sensor, producing 720p50/720p60 bitstream compliant with AVCHD and Blu-ray Disc specifications. As of 2013, AVCHD Lite seems to have been all but replaced with other formats. For example, the Panasonic DMC FZ-200 offers AVCHD Progressive recording mode (50fps/60fps acquisition and stream rate) as well as MP4 mode (25fps/30fps acquisition and stream rate).

=== AVCCAM ===
Formerly known as "AVCHD with professional features," AVCCAM is the name of professional AVCHD camcorders from Panasonic's Broadcast division. Some of these professional features listed in early Panasonic advertising materials included 1/3-inch progressive 3CCD sensor, XLR microphone input, solid-state media and capability of recording at the maximum AVCHD bit rate – 24 Mbit/s. The aforementioned features are not exclusive to AVCCAM. Moreover, some of these features like CCD sensor technology have been dropped by Panasonic, while 24 Mbit/s recording rate is widely available from rival manufacturers even on consumer models.

=== AVCHD Pro ===
Panasonic uses "AVCHD Pro" moniker to describe camcorders like the HDC-MDH1, which combines consumer internal parts and controls with shoulder-mount type body. Panasonic touts that the camcorder is "shaped for Pro-Style shooting in Full-HD" with shoulder-mount type body being "preferred by professionals".

=== NXCAM ===
NXCAM is the name of Sony's professional video lineup employing the AVCHD format. NXCAM camcorders offer 1080i, 1080p and 720p recording modes. Unlike AVCCAM, not all NXCAM camcorders offer film-like frame rates—24p, 25p, 30p—in 720p mode.

== Playing back AVCHD video ==
Recorded AVCHD video can be played back in a variety of ways:

- Direct playback – video can be played on a television set from a camcorder through HDMI or component-video cable.
- AVCHD disc – AVCHD video, recorded onto DVD can be played on most Blu-ray Disc players or on a PlayStation 3 gaming console.
- Blu-ray – AVCHD video, recorded onto Blu-ray can be played on most Blu-ray Disc players (see table below).
- AVCHD memory card – AVCHD video, recorded on an SDHC or Memory Stick card can be played on select Blu-ray Disc players, HDTV sets, on a PlayStation 3 gaming console and on some other set-top media players.
- USB playback – video files, recorded on an external storage device like a hard disk drive or a USB "stick" can be played on select Blu-ray Disc players, HDTV sets, gaming consoles, set-top media players and from a computer.
- Computer playback – any media and target format that is supported by a particular computer hardware and software can be watched on a computer monitor or TV set. Presently, the open-source VLC media player plays AVCHD video files and a wide variety of additional formats, and is freely available for most modern operating systems (including Linux, macOS, MS Windows) and some mobile platforms. Since Mountain Lion, macOS does support native AVCHD playback via the default media player, QuickTime. Some Windows 7 editions can import and play AVCHD video natively, having files with extensions M2TS, MTS and M2T pre-registered in the system. (Windows 7 starter edition does not support AVCHD files out of the box, and so requires a third-party player.) In editions of Windows 7 that do support AVCHD files, Windows Media Player can index content in these files, and Windows Explorer can create thumbnails for each clip. Windows 7 does not support importing of AVCHD video metadata such as thumbnail images, playlists, and clip index files. Joining AVCHD video files during the import is not supported either.

=== AVCHD as distribution format ===
AVCHD disc icon (Sony)

A DVD disc with AVCHD high-definition video recorded on it is sometimes called an AVCHD disc. AVCHD discs cannot be played in a standard DVD player, but can be played in many Blu-ray Disc players. Smooth playback is not guaranteed if overall data rate exceeds 18 Mbit/s. It is possible to create simple menus similar to menus used for DVD-video discs.

AVCHD content can also be recorded on SDHC cards and played by many television sets, Blu-ray Disc players and media consoles.

The AVCHD specification does not officially support Blu-ray Disc media, though some software packages allow authoring AVCHD content on Blu-ray Discs. For better compatibility with Blu-ray Disc players AVCHD video can be authored on Blu-ray Disc media as Blu-ray Disc video. Authoring a Blu-ray Disc video title does not require re-encoding of AVCHD audio and video streams. The resultant disc plays in any Blu-ray Disc player, including those that do not explicitly support AVCHD.

Many software vendors support AVCHD mastering. In particular:

- Cyberlink PowerDirector and PowerProducer can author a compliant AVCHD disc, or BDMV on DVD media.
- Corel (formerly Ulead) DVD MovieFactory 7 can master AVCHD discs with menus.
- Various Sonic products can author AVCHD discs using HD/BD Plug-in.
- Compressor 3.5 is capable of authoring AVCHD discs; subtitles are not supported.
- Nero Vision 9 can create an AVCHD disc with data rate up to 18 Mbit/s, or an AVCHD-compliant folder for distribution on an HDD or a memory card with data rate up to 24 Mbit/s.
- Sony DVD Architect 5 can author AVCHD-compliant discs with menus using AVC encoding as well as non-standard discs using MPEG-2 encoding. In both cases data rate is limited to 18 Mbit/s.
- Panasonic HD Writer AE can author AVCHD content on DVDs, BD discs and on SD cards.
- MultiAVCHD can author AVCHD discs as well as Panasonic-compliant AVCHD memory cards.
- Magix Movie Edit Pro 15 Plus with updates can author AVCHD content on DVDs, BD discs.
- Pinnacle Studio 11.1.2 and higher offers AVCHD disc output.

Although AVCHD shares many format similarities with Blu-ray Disc, it is not part of the Blu-ray Disc specification. Consequently, AVCHD-playback is not universally supported across Blu-ray Disc players. Blu-ray Disc players with "AVCHD" logo play AVCHD discs authored either on 8 cm or 12 cm DVDs. Players without such a logo are not guaranteed to play AVCHD discs.

The 1080-line 50p/60p AVCHD Progressive recording mode employed in some camcorders, is not compliant with the current Blu-ray Disc specification, though many current player models unofficially support it if they support AVCHD format.

== Hardware products ==
=== Canon ===
Depending on model, Canon camcorders offer 1080-line interlaced, PsF, and native 24p recording.

- HR10 (DVD)
- 2007: HG10 (40 GB HDD)
- April 2008: HF10 (SDHC, built-in 16 GB flash memory), HF100 (SDHC)
- September 2008: HF11 (SDHC, built-in 32 GB flash memory), HG20 (60 GB HDD, SDHC), HG21 (120 GB HDD, SDHC)
- January 2009: HF S10 (SDHC, built-in 32 GB flash memory), HF S100 (SDHC), HF20 (SDHC, built-in 32 GB flash memory), HF200 (SDHC)
- August 2009: HF S11 (SDHC, built-in 64 GB flash memory, wired LANC remote capability)
- January 2010: HF S21 (two SDHC slots, 64 GB flash memory, electronic viewfinder), HF S20 (two SDHC slots, 32 GB flash memory), HF S200 (two SDHC slots); HF M31 (SDHC, 32 GB flash memory), HF M30 (SDHC, 8 GB flash memory), HF M300 (SDHC); HF R11 (32 GB flash memory), HF R10 (SDHC, 8 GB flash memory), HF R100 (SDHC)
- April 2011: HF G10 (with 1/3 inch image sensor)
- March 2012: HF M500 (with 1/3 inch image sensor; 24pf, 30pf, and 60i; removable SDHC/SDXC flash memory) / HF G20 4:2:2

=== Hitachi ===
- 2008: DZ-BD10HA (Three-media recording: Blu-ray Disc, AVCHD on HDD, AVCHD on SDHC)

=== JVC ===
- 2008 June: GZ-HD10 (HDD, MicroSDHC), GZ-HD30/GZ-HD40(HDD, MicroSDHC card, dual AVCHD and TOD recording)
- 2009 January: GZ-HD320 (100 GB HDD, MicroSD), GZ-HD300 (59 GB HDD, MicroSD), GZ-HM200 (dual SDHC)
- 2009 February: GZ-X900 (SD/SDHC card)
- 2009 September: GZ-HM300, GZ-HM400
- 2009 December: GZ-HD620
- 2010 March: GZ-HM1
- 2011 January: GZ-HM30 (pre-released December 2010)
- 2011: GZ-HM4XX, GZ-HM6XX, GZ-HM8XX, GZ-HM9XX
- 2013: GZ-EX555
- 2014: GZ-R10BAA
- 2018: GZ-R495BE

=== Leica Camera ===
Digital still cameras

- 2010: LEICA D-LUX 5, LEICA V-LUX 2
- 2012: LEICA D-LUX 6

=== Panasonic ===
Panasonic AVCHD camcorders offer interlaced, progressive scan or native progressive recording and combinations of these modes depending on a particular model. 1080-line and 720-line recording is possible depending on a model.

Panasonic AVCHD camcorders use AVC with High Profile @ Level 4.0 for all modes except 1080p50/1080p60, which are encoded with High Profile @ Level 4.2. Maximum data rate is limited to 24 Mbit/s for AVCCAM models, to 17 Mbit/s for most consumer models and to 28 Mbit/s for 1080p50/1080p60 recording modes.

- December 2006: HDC-DX1 (DVD), HDC-SD1 (SDHC)
- HDC-SD3 (SDHC, available in Japan only)
- AG-HSC1U - essentially a rebadged HDC-HC1 (SDHC, comes with portable 40 GB HDD storage)
- August 2007: HDC-SD5 (SDHC), HDC-SX5 (DVD, SDHC), HDC-SD7 (SDHC)
- January 2008: HDC-SD9 (SDHC), HDC-HS9 (60 GB HDD, SDHC)
- April 2008: AG-HMC70 (SDHC)
- June 2008: HDC-SD100 (SDHC), HDC-HS100 (60 GB HDD, SDHC)
- September 2008: AG-HMC150 (SDHC)
- January 2009: HDC-HS300 (120 GB HDD), HDC-HS200 (80 GB HDD), HDC-TM300 (32 GB built-in flash memory, SDHC), HDC-SD300 (SDHC, available in Europe only), HDC-SD200 (SDHC).
- June 2009: HDC-TM30/HDC-TM10 (32 GB built-in flash memory, SDHC), HDC-SD10 (SDHC)
- June 2009: HDC-TM350 (64 GB built-in flash memory, SDHC, available in Japan and as of October 2009, from Panasonic Stores across the UK)
- September 2009: AG-HMC40 (SDHC)
- February 2010: HDC-TM700/HDC-SD700/HDC-HS700 (introduced 1080p60/1080p50 modes, depending on region)
- March 2010: HDC-SD60/HDC-TM60/HDC-HS60
- December 2010: AG-AF100/AG-AF101/AG-AF102 (4/3" large sensor camera)
- September 2011: AG-AC130/AG-AC160 (SDXC/SDHC/SD)
- June 2014: AG-AC90A; upgrade of the AG-AC90

In 2009 Panasonic introduced AVCHD Lite and AVCHD to selected members of its Lumix line of digital cameras:

- 2009: DMC-ZS3/TZ7*, DMC-TS1/DMC-FT1* (AVCHD Lite)
- 2009: DMC-GH1 (AVCHD)
- 2010: Lumix DMC-ZS7/TZ10*, DMC-G2 (AVCHD lite)
- 2010: Lumix DMC-GH2, DMC-GF2 (AVCHD)
- 2011: Lumix DMC-ZS10/TZ20* (AVCHD lite)
- 2011: Lumix DMC-FX77/FX78*, DMC-TS3*, DMC-FZ45/47/48*
- 2011: Lumix DMC-GF2, DMC-G3/GF3 (AVCHD)
- 2012: Lumix DMC-ZS20/TZ30 (AVCHD, AVCHD Progressive: GPH, PSH)
- 2012: Lumix DMC-G5
- 2012: Lumix DMC-FZ200
- 2012: Lumix DMC-GH3 with a bit rate of 28 Megabit per second (AVCHD 2.0)
- 2012: Panasonic Lumix DMC-LX7

* to avoid European specific tax, Panasonic digital cameras for this market are limited to 30 minutes recording.

=== Sony ===
Consumer Sony AVCHD camcorders released before 2011 could record 1080-line interlaced video only, while the prosumer HDR-AX2000 and professional HXR-NX5 cameras were capable of recording in interlaced and progressive formats.

Released in March 2011, the Sony NEX-FS100 is the first professional NXCAM camcorder capable of 1080p50/p60 recording; consumer-grade HandyCam NEX-VG20 followed in August 2011.

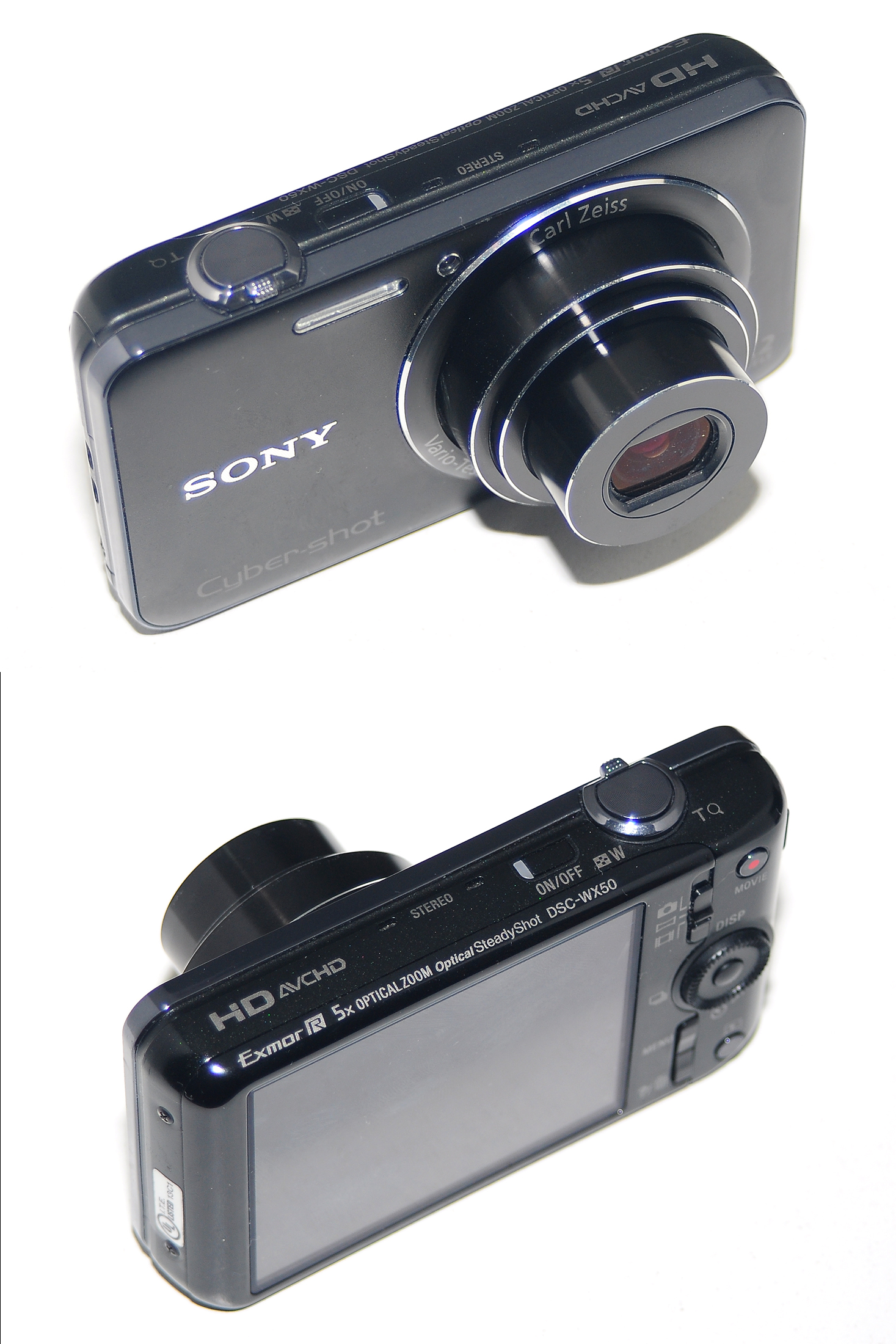
Sony CyberShot WX50, with AVCHD video recording.

The list of AVCHD camcorders includes:

- September 2006: HDR-UX1 (DVD), HDR-UX3/UX5 (DVD), HDR-UX7 (DVD)
- October 2006: HDR-SR1 (30 GB HDD)
- June 2007: HDR-SR5 (40 GB HDD), HDR-SR7 (60 GB HDD)
- July 2007: HDR-SR5C (100 GB HDD), HDR-SR8 (100 GB HDD)
- Summer 2007: HDR-CX7 (Memory Stick Duo)
- March 2008: HDR-SR10 (40 GB HDD, Memory Stick), HDR-SR11 (60 GB HDD, Memory Stick), HDR-SR12 (120 GB HDD, Memory Stick)
- HDR-TG1/TG3/TG7 (Memory Stick Duo)
- August 2008: HDR-CX12 (Memory Stick Duo)
- March 2009: HDR-CX100 (8 GB HDD, Memory Stick Duo)
- March 2009: HDR-XR520V (240 GB HDD), HDR-XR500V (120 GB HDD Version)
- March 2009: HDR-XR200V (120 GB HDD)
- March 2009: HDR-XR200VE (120 GB HDD + GPS)
- March 2009: HDR-XR100 (80 GB HDD)
- July 2009: HDR-CX500E, HDR-CX520E
- October 2009: HDR-CX105 (8 GB Memory Stick Duo)
- January 2010: HXR-NX5, HDR-AX2000.
- March 2010: HDR-XR550 (240 GB HDD)
- June 2010: Sony NEX-5, NEX-5C (without Eye-Fi support), of both models, variants with AVCHD 1080 50i and AVCHD 1080 60i only exist
- July 2010: Sony HXR-MC50E.
- March 2011: Sony NEX-FS100
- August 2011: NEX-VG20
- October 2011: Sony SLT-A65, Sony SLT-A77V, Sony NEX-5N, Sony NEX-7

In 2010, Sony introduced AVCHD to selected members of its Cybershot line of digital cameras.

- January 2010: DSC-HX5V (GPS+COMPASS), HX5V-E (European version, limited to 30 minutes recording due to European specific taxes)
- March 2011: DSC-HX9V (GPS+COMPASS), HX9V-E (European version, limited to 30 minutes recording due to European specific taxes)
- 2012: DSC-HX10V, DSC-HX20V, DSC-RX100, DSC-WX50
- 2013: DSC-RX100 II, DSC-HX50V
- 2014: DSC-RX100 III
- 2015: DSC-RX100 IV

== Software ==
=== Codecs ===
- FFmpeg includes an AVCHD decoder in its libavcodec library that is used for example by ffdshow, a free, Open Source collection of codecs for Microsoft Windows.
- CoreAVC is an H.264 decoder for Windows, which can decode AVCHD as well as a variety of other H.264 formats.
- Gstreamer uses libavcodec to decode AVCHD on Linux, BSD, OS/X, Windows, and Solaris

=== Converters ===
- Badaboom is a media converter that uses NVIDIA GPUs to accelerate conversion of AVCHD to mobile devices.
- HandBrake converts AVCHD Lite format to MP4 and MKV (tested on macOS; other versions available), AVI and OGM are supported in versions before 0.9.4.
- Roxio Toast 10 Titanium on macOS converts AVCHD to most formats.
- Total video converter is a converter for most video formats, including converting from AVCHD and burning AVCHD disc.
- iDealshare VideoGo can convert AVCHD to MP4, ProRes, MOV, AVI, WMV, FLV, DV, MKV, VOB etc.

=== Editors ===
The following video-editing software features support for the AVCHD format:

- Apple iMovie for some cameras/camcorders.
- Adobe Premiere Pro (from version CS4 onwards). (Creative Cloud 2013 version natively supports AVCHD Dolby Digital.)
- Adobe Premiere Elements (version 7 through 9 only support import, no AVCHD output), version 10 supports AVCHD output.
- Avidemux Video editor for Linux and Windows
- Apple Final Cut Pro X natively supports AVCHD through Import From Camera.
- Apple Final Cut Pro for macOS. The latest version of Final Cut Pro 7 claims better integration with Apple's other professional applications and improved codec support for editing HD, DV and SD video formats, including encoding presets for devices such as iPod, Apple TV, and Blu-ray Discs.
- Apple Final Cut Express 4, Final Cut Pro 6.0.1, and iMovie '08-'09 (iMovie is bundled with all new Apple computers; Final Cut Express and Pro are sold separately) do not support editing of AVCHD clips directly. Imported AVCHD clips are automatically converted into the Apple Intermediate Codec format, which requires more hard disk space (40 GB per hour as opposed to 13.5 GB per hour for Standard Definition DV), a more powerful machine (an Intel-based Mac), and a more recent OS (Mac OS X 10.5). Final Cut Pro 6.0.5 "logs and transfers" the footage from AVCHD to AppleProRes by default and also gives the option of converting to the Apple Intermediate Codec. It does not allow native transferring of the *.m2ts clips nor directly editing them. The latest release of Apple's iLife suite (specifically, iMovie) has added support for AVCHD Lite cameras. It automatically imports AVCHD files when attaching a supported camera to the computer, and it can import older MTS or M2TS files that have been rewrapped (see above) e.g. as m4v.
- Avid Media Composer (version 5.x and later) supports AVCHD via transcode import. AMA linking is available in Avid Media Composer 6 when a special AMA plugin is downloaded from the Avid download center.
- AVS Video Editor supports videos from HD-cameras(HD Video (inc. AVCHD, MPEG-2 HD and WMV HD), TOD, MOD, M2TS.) Burn AVCHD video to CD-R/RW, DVD+/-R, DVD+/-RW, DVD-RAM, Double/Dual Layer on Windows XP, 2003, Vista, 7 (no macOS/Linux support).
- Blender supports the AVCHD format by using an FFmpeg decoder. Blender has a little-known, video editing system that integrates with its 3D editing tools. It supports proxy editing at down to 25% scaling, which helps when editing AVCHD video, which is slow.
- Corel VideoStudio supports importing, rendering and burning of AVCHD format in Windows system.
- Cyberlink PowerDirector 11 is capable of editing AVCHD 2.0 3D/Progressive natively, without transcoding, intermediate formats or proxy files. Using a patented technique (SVRT), AVCHD clips can be edited and output losslessly to AVCHD or Blu-ray Disc. PowerDirector also supports OpenCL encoding acceleration on Intel, AMD and nVidia graphics platforms. PowerDirector can output the finished movie to a variety of video formats, DVD, AVCHD on DVD, removable storage device, SD/SDHC/SDXC memory card, Memory Stick or Blu-ray Disc.
- Dayang Montage Extreme [ME] 1.2
- Grass Valley Edius from 5.5 up to 9.5 (current version) and historically Edius Neo from 2 until 3.5 but not on current Windows versions.
- Kdenlive for Linux and BSD platforms
- Lightworks for Windows and Linux, starting with version 11.1. AVCHD support is available in the Free and Pro versions, however, the free version requires transcoding into a different format upon import of AVCHD files.
- Microsoft Windows Live Movie Maker 2011 (part of the Windows Live Essentials package) converts to lower resolution for editing and playback, but is capable of exporting in HD.
- Nero Ultra Edition Enhanced (from version 7 onwards) includes the Nero Vision editor and the Nero Showtime player, which both support AVCHD files. NeroVision can author DVDs in the AVCHD format.
- OpenShot Video Editor for Windows, macOS, and Linux
- Pinnacle Studio Plus (from version 11 onwards)
- Ulead Video Studio 11 has announced a support for MTS/M2TS, however many user report that this statement is completely false and the editor cannot import video of that format, not to mention editing.
- VSDC Free Video Editor
- Pitivi Video editor for Linux
- Sony Vegas 7.0e
- Sony Vegas Pro (from version 8 onwards)
- Sony Vegas Movie Studio Platinum (from version 8 onwards)
- Other developers have pledged their support but it may still take some time for the implementation.

=== Open Source codecs ===
The following open source codecs can decode AVCHD files:

- ffdshow tryouts, revision 1971 May 23, 2008, decodes AVC (H.264) format video.
- libavcodec (part of FFmpeg project) is a codec library that supports AVCHD. It is used in Jahshaka and Blender, notably.

== Specifications ==
Video
Since	AVCHD 1.0				AVCHD 2.0			
Subtype	High Definition (AVCHD-HD)		Standard Definition (AVCHD-SD)		AVCHD Progressive		AVCHD 3D (stereoscopic)	
Frame size in pixels	1920x1080; 1440x1080	1280x720	720x480	720x576	1920x1080	1440x1080	1280x1024	1920x1080
Field/frame rate	60i, 50i, 24p	60p, 50p, 24p	60i	50i	60p, 50p			24p, 50i, 60i
Frame aspect ratio	16:9		4:3, 16:9		16:9			
Video Compression	MPEG-4 AVC/H.264; Main Profile (MP) and High Profile (HP), Level 4.1 (AVCHD 1.0) or 4.2 (AVCHD 2.0).							
Luminance sampling frequency	74.25 MHz (1080); 55.7 MHz (768)	74.25 MHz	13.5 MHz	13.5 MHz	148.5 MHz	111.4 MHz	74.25 MHz	
Chroma sampling format	4:2:0							
Quantization	8 bits (both luminance and chrominance)							
Audio (Dolby Digital)
AC-3 Compression	Dolby Digital (AC-3)							
AC-3 channel mode	1–5.1 channels							
AC-3 compressed bitstream rate	64 to 640 kbit/s							
Audio (PCM; NXCAM only)
PCM type	Linear PCM uncompressed audio							
PCM channel mode	1–7.1 channels							
PCM bit rate	1.5 Mbit/s (2 channels)							
System
Stream type	MPEG transport stream							
System data rate	up to 18 Mbit/s (DVD media); up to 24 Mbit/s (all other media)				up to 28 Mbit/s			
File extension (generally)	mts (on camcorder), m2ts (after import to computer)							
Media	8 cm optical media (DVD, AVCHD 1.0 formats only); SD/SDHC/SDXC Memory Card; "Memory Stick"; Built-in hard-disk or flash Media							

For simplicity, the combination of frame rate and video format is denoted using the common simplified notation of NNx, where NN is the frame rate rounded to integer and x is the format ("i" for interlaced and "p" for progressive). In this table, "60" actually runs at 59.94 frames/sec, "30" actually runs at 29.97 frames/sec, and "24" actually runs at 23.976 frames/sec, a relic of NTSC video.

== See also ==
- AVC-Intra: an intra-frame video format based on AVC compression scheme, offered on professional Panasonic video cameras.
- iFrame: an intra-frame video format based on AVC compression scheme, marketed by Apple and offered on some consumer camcorders.
- AVCREC: a standard to allow recording of broadcast HD programming on recordable DVDs using AVC encoding scheme.
- Comparison of video editing software
- XAVC
