= Panasonic Lumix DMC-GH4 =

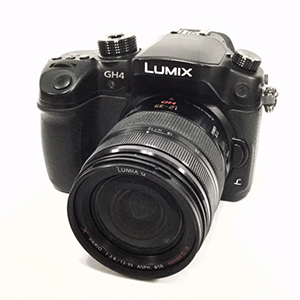

Overview
- Maker: Panasonic Holdings Corporation
- Type: Micro Four Thirds system

Lens
- Lens mount: Micro Four Thirds
- Lens: Micro Four Thirds system mount

Sensor/medium
- Sensor: 4/3 type MOS ("Live MOS sensor")
- Sensor size: 17.3 x 13.0 mm (in 4:3 aspect ratio)
- Maximum resolution: 4608 x 3456 (16 megapixels)
- Film speed: ISO 200–25600, extendable to 100
- Storage media: SD / SDHC / SDXC

Focusing
- Focus modes: AF Single, AF Flexible, AF Continuous, Manual focus

Exposure/metering
- Exposure modes: Program AE, Aperture priority, Shutter priority, Manual
- Metering modes: Multiple, Center weighted, Spot

Flash
- Flash: built-in pop-up flash
- Flash bracketing: ±3EV EV in ⅓ EV steps

Shutter
- Shutter: Focal-plane shutter / Electronic shutter
- Shutter speed range: 1/16,000 – 60 s, bulb (max. 60 minutes)
- Continuous shooting: 12 frames/s (mechanical shutter), 40 frames/s (electronic shutter)

Viewfinder
- Viewfinder: OLED Live View Finder (2,359K dots)

Image processing
- White balance: Auto, Daylight, Cloudy, Shade, Incandescent, Flash, White Set 1/2/3/4, Color temperature setting

General
- Video recording: AVCHD / MP4 / MOV, 4096×2160 (24p), 3840×2160 (24p, 25p, 30p), 1920×1080 (24p, 25p, 30p, 50p, 60p), 1280×720 (24p, 25p, 30p), 640×480 (25p, 30p)
- LCD screen: free-angle 3 inch (3:2 aspect ratio), 1036K dots
- Battery: 1860 mAh 7.2v lithium-ion battery pack
- Dimensions: 132.9 mm × 93.4 mm × 83.9 mm (5.23 × 3.68 × 3.3 inches)
- Weight: Approx. 560 g (20 oz) (camera body with battery and SD card)

The Panasonic Lumix DMC-GH4 is a Micro Four Thirds system digital still and video camera originally released in May 2014. At the time of its release, the GH4 was notable for being the world's first mirrorless interchangeable-lens camera with 4K video recording capability.

== Features ==
The GH4 is largely physically similar to its predecessor, the Panasonic Lumix DMC-GH3, adding only a locking mode dial and more detailed rear LCD screen and electronic viewfinder.

The emphasis of the camera is the video with Venus Engine IX processor allow for 4K video and 12 fps continuous shooting. As a 4K video camera, it can be categorized as a pro-level video camera that can record in Cinema 4K mode (4096 x 2160) or standard 4K-UHD (3840 x 2160) using IPB compression in 100 Mbit/s. In Full 1080p HD there are two options, 200 Mbit/s in ALL-Intra compression, or 100 Mbit/s with no recording time limit. The camera also provides .mov, MP4, AVCHD Progressive, and AVCHD video formats at a variety of frame rates, according to the usage, and options for variable frame rate (VFR) or time Lapse/stop motion animation without the need for post-production processing.

Autofocus needs only 0.07 seconds with the "Depth from Defocus" autofocus system. The camera also has Wi-Fi with NFC, Prontor-Compur (PC) sync port, highlight and shadow control, and a "silent mode" that uses the electronic shutter only. Video features added to the DMC-GH4 include focus peaking, zebra overlay, luminance level adjustment, and cinema gamma presets.

== DMW-YAGH interface ==
Along with the GH4, Panasonic also released the YAGH interface unit, a camera-attached device to increase input and output options for the GH4. The YAGH connects to the GH4 via an attachment screw on the bottom of the camera, as well as a sliding mechanism that plugs into the camera's HDMI port on the side. The interface contains two 3-pin XLR connector inputs, which are controlled by a pair of preamplifiers inside the unit, offering phantom power, more control over input gain levels and microphone choice, and input metering via LED meters on the interface. The YAGH also provides a timecode input for multi-device synchronization.

For outputs, the YAGH offers four BNC connector terminals for serial digital interface use with outboard recorders and monitors. In addition, a full-size HDMI port is also present. These video outputs differ from the camera's native recording in that they offer a 10-bit 4:2:2 signal, rather than the camera's internal 8-bit 4:2:0.

The YAGH interface is not powered by the camera, instead relying on 12-volt DC power provided by a separate battery or power supply using a four-pin XLR type connector.

Brand	Form	Class	2008	2009	2010	2011			2012	2013	2014	2015	2016	2017	2018	2019	2020	2021	2022	2023	2024	25
Olympus	SLR style OM-D	Professional															E-M1X ^{R}					
Olympus	SLR style OM-D	High-end									E-M1			E-M1 II ^{R}			E-M1 III ^{R}					
Olympus	SLR style OM-D	Advanced							E-M5			E-M5 II ^{R}					E-M5 III ^{R}					
Olympus	SLR style OM-D	Mid-range									E-M10		E-M10 II		E-M10 III			E-M10 IV				
Olympus	Rangefinder style PEN	Mid-range		E-P1	E-P2		E-P3				E-P5		PEN-F ^{R}									
Olympus	Rangefinder style PEN	Upper-entry			E-PL1	E-PL2		E-PL3	E-PL5		E-PL6	E-PL7		E-PL8	E-PL9		E-PL10					
Olympus	Rangefinder style PEN	Entry-level					E-PM1		E-PM2													
Olympus	remote													Air								
OM System	SLR style	Professional																	OM-1 ^{R}		OM-1 II ^{R}	
OM System	SLR style	High-end																				OM-3 ^{R}
OM System	SLR style	Advanced																		OM-5 ^{R}		
OM System	PEN	Mid-range																	E-P7			
Panasonic	SLR style	High-end Video													GH5S				GH6 ^{R}			GH7 ^{R}
Panasonic	SLR style	High-end Photo													G9 ^{R}						G9 II ^{R}	
Panasonic	SLR style	High-end		GH1		GH2			GH3		GH4				GH5				GH5II			
Panasonic	SLR style	Mid-range		G1	G2		G3		G5		G6		G7	G80/G85			G90/G95					
Panasonic	SLR style	Entry-level			G10													G100			G100D	
Panasonic	Rangefinder style	Advanced							GX1		GX7		GX8		GX9							
Panasonic	Rangefinder style	Mid-range									GM1	GM5	GX80/GX85									
Panasonic	Rangefinder style	Entry-level			GF1	GF2	GF3		GF5		GF6	GF7	GF8	GX800/GX850/GF9		GX880/GF10/GF90						
Panasonic	Camcorder	Professional							AG-AF104													
Kodak	Rangefinder style	Entry-level										S-1										
DJI	Drone	.												Zenmuse X5S								
DJI	Drone	.												Zenmuse X5								
YI	Rangefinder style	Entry-level												M1								
Yongnuo	Rangefinder style	Android camera															YN450M		YN455			
Blackmagic Design	Rangefinder style	High-End Video							Cinema Camera													
Blackmagic Design	Rangefinder style	High-End Video									Pocket Cinema Camera					Pocket Cinema Camera 4K						
Blackmagic Design		High-End Video										Micro Cinema Camera									Micro Studio Camera 4K G2	
Z CAM	Cinema	Advanced											E1			E2						
Z CAM	Cinema	Mid-Range																E2-M4				
Z CAM	Cinema	Entry-Level															E2C					
JVC	Camcorder	Professional										GY-LS300										
SVS-Vistek		Industrial							EVO Tracer													
