= Panasonic Lumix DMC-GH1 =

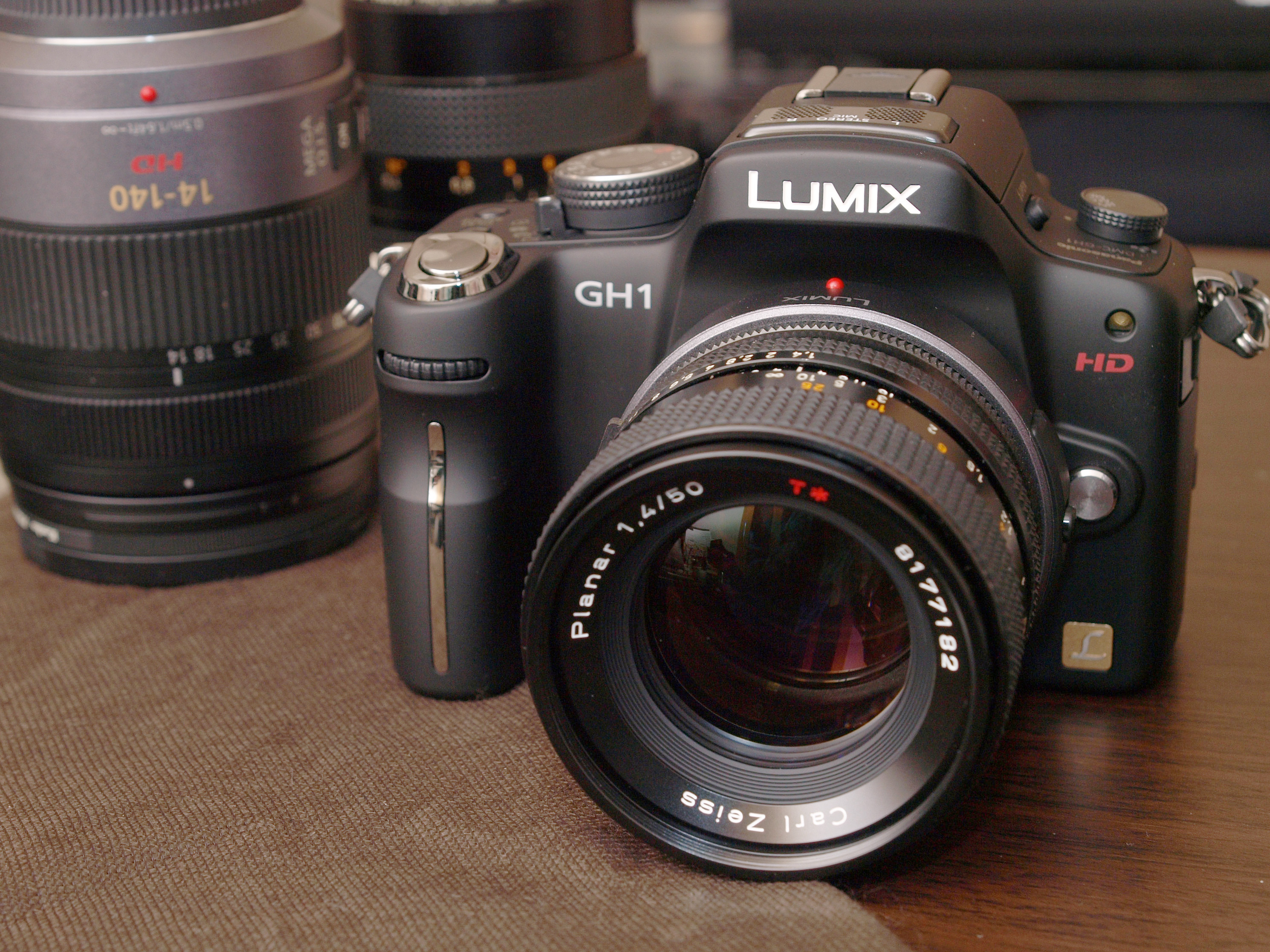
- Panasonic DMC-GH1K

Overview
- Maker: Panasonic Holdings Corporation
- Type: Micro Four Thirds System
- Released: 2009

Lens
- Lens: Micro Four Thirds System mount

Sensor/medium
- Sensor: 18.89 × 14.48 mm Live MOS (17.3 x 13 usable in 4:3 aspect ratio)
- Maximum resolution: 4000×3000 (14.0 megapixels multi-aspect; 12.1 mp effective); 4:3, 3:2, 16:9, 1:1 image format
- Film speed: ISO 100–3200

Focusing
- Focus modes: Automatic or Manual

Exposure/metering
- Exposure modes: Manual, Program, Automatic, Shutter Priority, Aperture Priority
- Exposure metering: Intelligent Multiple (Center weighted, average and spot)

Flash
- Flash: Built-in pop up, TTL, GN 10.5m equivalent (ISO100 · m)

Shutter
- Shutter speed range: 60–1/4000 sec

Viewfinder
- Viewfinder: EVF color display, 100% field of view, 0.7x (35mm equiv), 1.4x magnification, with 1,440K dots equivalent; LCD or articulated multi-angle 3.0 inch color LCD (460,000 dots equivalent)

The Panasonic Lumix DMC-GH1 is a digital mirrorless interchangeable lens camera adhering to the Olympus and Panasonic developed Micro Four Thirds System (MFT) system design standard. Panasonic classified the GH1 as a hybrid stills/video camera and the GH1 was introduced and marketed as a higher end camera than Panasonic's first MFT camera, the stills only, non-video capable Lumix DMC-G1.

The Panasonic Lumix DMC-GH1 was the second MFT camera introduced under the MFT design standard and the first MFT camera to include HD video recording capability. The GH1 was announced at the April 2009 Photo Marketing Association Annual Convention and Trade Show.

As a part of marketing this camera, Panasonic sponsored some professional filmmakers by allowing them to borrow the GH1 camera for their projects. One such GH1 model camera was used to film the pilot of the Swedish horror film Marianne.

== Panasonic Lumix DMC-GH1 Features ==
When announced in March 2009, the Panasonic Lumix DMC-GH1 was marketed as a new class of "Creative HD Hybrid" camera, and as Panasonic's top-of-the-line Micro Four Thirds (MFT) system camera. The GH1 appeared to be the first fully compliant camera with the MFT system standard, which includes High Definition (HD) video capability. The hybrid GH1 was designed to not only to take still photos, but full HD video, including manual controls over many video functions.

The resulting GH1 camera was a smaller and lighter interchangeable lens camera when compared with traditional Digital Single Lens Reflex (DSLR)s. Like a DSLR, the GH1 design follows the interchangeable lens DSLR form and function instead of the more traditional handheld consumer video camcorder form and function. Unlike the DSLR, the GH1, eliminated the bulky mirror box and pentaprism assembly in favour of a high resolution electronic viewfinder (EVF), allowing smaller, lighter overall body size and the use of new, smaller and lighter weight lens designs.

At first glance, the GH1 appeared to be just a video capable version of the world's first MFT system camera, the Panasonic Lumix DMC-G1 mirrorless interchangeable lens camera, first introduced in September 2008 In fact, there were many distinguishing features that made the GH1 a unique, and perhaps even a ground breaking product. Some of these features, as well as some that appeared on the DMC-G1 are discussed below including a new multi-aspect image ratio sensor, full AVCHD HD video capability, stereo sound recording, dual CPU image processing, and a super zoom lens optimized for video.

=== Multi-Aspect Ratio Sensor ===
Panasonic first pioneered the concept of a multi-aspect ratio image sensor in its high-end compact camera, the 2008 Panasonic Lumix DMC-LX3 which used a much smaller 1/1.63" CCD technology sensor.

Building on the multi-aspect ratio sensor concept, the HD video capable GH1 was designed around a much larger four thirds sized sensor (about four times more area); a unique 14.0 megapixel (12.1 megapixel effective) Live MOS sensor. The 14 megapixel multi-aspect image ratio GH1 sensor was designed to cover a slightly larger image circle than the native 4:3 image aspect ratio of its 12.1 megapixel cousin in the G1. This means that the GH1 14 megapixel sensor was capable of recording images in user selectable, native aspect ratios of 4:3, 3:2 and 16:9 with no cropping, and more importantly, the same angle of view and maximization of pixel count in any particular format.

Most other digital cameras achieve different image aspect ratios by cropping the image from the native sensor format. For example, most digital cameras with native 4:3 image aspect ratio sensors crop the native image on the top and the bottom to achieve either 3:2 or 16:9 images. On the other hand, most DSLRs crop their 3:2 native image aspect ratio on the top and the bottom to achieve 16:9, or in some cases, crop the 3:2 native image on either side to achieve 4:3 images.

In fact, the GH1 sensor is never used to its full capacity for 14 megapixels, but for any of the three formats, as much of the sensor is used as possible, and more importantly, each image has the same point of view. For example, when cropping images from a native format, such as a 4:3 image, the point of view changes slightly, and a lot of pixels are lost, close to 25% when cropping a 16:9 image out of a 4:3 native format image. The multi-aspect ratio sensor cuts down on the loss of pixels so the pixel count for each aspect ratio is as close to 12 megapixels as possible. The multi-aspect ratio also allows more usable lens image depending on the format. For example, in a native 4:3 format, the image width is 4000 pixels, but in a native 16:9 format, the image width is 4352 pixels or about 8% wider. With a multi-aspect imager, the net effect is that any given lens has a slightly wider field of view in either native 3:2 or 16:9 when compared to the native 4:3 image format, as demonstrated by the table below.

GH1 Four Thirds Multi-Aspect vs Single-Aspect Ratio Pixel Count

Multi-Aspect	Width	Height	Area	Single-Aspect	Width	Height	Area	Single-Aspect*	Width	Height	Area
4:3	4000	3000	12000000	4:3	4000	3000	12000000	4:3	4608	3456	15925248
3:2	4128	2752	11360256	3:2	4000	2672	10688000	3:2	4608	3072	14155776
16:9	4352	2448	10653696	16:9	4000	2248	8992000	16:9	4608	2592	11943936
1:1	2992	2992	8952064	1:1	2992	2992	8952064	1:1	3456	3456	11943936

The multi-aspect sensor is also capable of producing 1:1 format images, but this is a cropped image from the 4:3 format.

- ) Olympus OMD E-M5 with 16 megapixels, which in 16:9 format has only 12.1% more pixels compared to the GH1.

=== True HD Video AVCHD Recording ===
The GH1 was designed from the ground up to be capable of AVCHD recording in true HD 1080p at 24 frame/s or 720p at 60 frame/s high-definition videos with continuous autofocus (AF) and Dolby Digital stereo sound recording. The GH1 was also the first consumer-priced interchangeable lens camera to also offer continuous autofocus capability while shooting HD video.

Notably, since the introduction of the GH1, every other MFT system compliant camera, whether made by Olympus or Panasonic, has been capable of some type of AVCHD HD video. However, only the GH1 and the successor GH2 have provided the wide range of manual control over HD video recording, garnering the attention of amateur film makers worldwide.

AVCHD is a file based (non-magnetic tape) format for recording and playback of HD video, jointly developed by Sony and Panasonic in 2006 for HD recording. All still or video/sound recording is to a SD or SDHC memory card. The user is also able to manually select shutter speed and aperture openings for more creative control over HD video recording. Dolby Digital stereo sound is recorded via a stereo microphone, with a wind blocking feature to reduce background wind noise, built into the camera. More capable, optional external stereo microphones may also be fitted to the camera.

While giving its best performance while recording in AVCHD, the GH1 can also record in more popular MPEG formats at a maximum resolution of 720p at 30 frame/s.

In the United States, the HD video recording length is limited to the capacity of the memory card (or the battery life, unless the AC power adapter is used). File sizes are no larger than 4 GB due to the SDHC file allocation table limits, but the video will be seamless between files. In Europe, however, the HD video recording length is limited to 30 minutes, due to EU regulatory and tax reasons.

=== Dual CPU Engine ===
HD video is data intensive, and Panasonic designed the GH1 around a dual CPU image processing system named the "Venus Engine HD". This dual CPU speeds up HD image processing and offers a number of other advantages, including improved image noise reduction performance, ability to display a live view direct from the sensor for either the fully articulated LCD on the camera back or the high resolution electronic view finder, a very fast contrast detect auto focus system, and even the ability to output both images and sound via HDMI directly from the camera.

At the time of introduction, the dual processor Venus Engine HD also allowed faster contrast detect autofocus ability at the time, in addition to the implementation of a live view electronic viewfinder with DSLR like functionality, but without the penalty of a complex and bulky mirror box and pentaprism. Several automatic focus modes are enhanced by the dual processor feature, 23 area focus, user-selectable single point focusing, face recognition focus, face detection focus, and automatic focus tracking.

In addition, the dual processor aids in the processor intensive AVCHD video processing.

=== Contrast Detect Auto Focus with Face Recognition and Detection ===
Traditional digital single-lens reflex cameras (DSLRs), typified by Canon EOS or Nikon FX or DX offerings use Phase Detect Auto Focus (PDAF) systems. PDAF are typically very fast and responsive systems. When used in Live view mode, especially for video, traditional DSLR's must rely on direct output from the main image sensor in order to autofocus. Relying strictly on the sensor output to autofocus is called Contrast Detect Auto Focus(CDAF). CDAF as implemented in contemporary, traditional DSLR's was so slow as to be almost unusable for all but non-moving objects.

The GH1 lacks a separate PDAF sensor and relies solely on CDAF techniques to autofocus. Designed from ground up as a live view, CDAF camera, and not as an "add on" auto focus system for a primarily PDAF centric camera, the GH1 CDAF system breaks new ground for an interchangeable lens camera. In combination with other features, including a 23 area AF, user selectable single AF point anywhere in the frame, subject tracking AF and facial recognition AF, the dual CPU equipped GH1 offered the fastest and most comprehensive CDAF system available at the time in a consumer camera, on par in most performance areas with similar entry level to mid-level priced contemporary DSLRs.

HD video mode also uses this purpose-designed contrast-detect AF system, making the GH1 the only DSLR styled camera at the time available to offer continuous autofocusing while shooting video.

Newly introduced for Panasonic MFT cameras was "Face Recognition", a facial recognition technology. The GH1 implementation of Face Recognition was an improvement of the concept first introduced in 2007 on the high end Panasonic Lumix DMC-L10 Four Thirds (not Micro Four Thirds) DSLR camera. The GH1 allows the user to memorize two different faces for easier prioritization. For example, if a child's face is set into memory, and the photo has many faces in it, the GH1 will attempt to focus on the memorized face.

Face Detection (as opposed to Face Recognition) is a technology used in a wide variety of cameras. When not using a memorized face, the camera will automatically prioritize focus on a face-like shape that the camera judges could be the main subject of the photo, attempting to further set the focus point, when possible at the eyes, in both still and video recording modes.

=== High Resolution Electronic Viewfinder ===
The GH1 uses a high resolution (1.44 million dots) electronic viewfinder (EVF), a sophisticated projection system to achieve a clearer, smoother display than that of compact camera EVFs. The high resolution electronic viewfinder uses a technology known as LCOS, the same technology used in Panasonic's professional high end video cameras, and is supposed to be capable of much higher resolution than either LCD or plasma display technologies. As implemented in the GH1, the effect is 60 frame/s full-time live view with no visible pixels for an image as large or larger, and brighter than competing optical viewfinders using a mirror box and pentaprism than most prosumer DSLR's.

The EVF has a high enough resolution view that manual focusing is possible. Unlike traditional optical viewfinders which may use a ground glass focusing screen, the GH1 EVF takes a small portion of the scene and magnifies it 10X. This magnified portion may be moved around to any section of the live view. In manual focus mode, touching the lens focus ring will immediately turn on the magnification for manual focusing.

The MFT system standard specifies the lens mount flange to image sensor plane distance (flange focal distance) as 20mm, which is less than half that of typical DSLRs. The effect is that the GH1 body is smaller in every critical dimension, especially depth, and is also lighter weight when compared to a typical DSLR. This 20mm flange to image sensor distance prohibits the practical implementation of the traditional mirror box and pentaprism optical viewfinder of the typical DSLR. The Panasonic electronic viewfinder is the solution to that packaging issue.

With an electronic viewfinder, in addition to providing a clear brighter than DSLR view, the user can also select between a variety of image aspect ratios (4:3; 3:2; 16:9 and 1:1) with a 100% image area through the lens in live view, something impossible with the traditional DSLR optical viewfinder.

The EVF allows additional flexibility is in information and situational awareness. The user may select various overlays so that more than 20 pieces of additional information are available at a glance to the user without removing the eye from the electronic viewfinder. For example, flash setting, optical image stabilization mode (there are 3), drive mode (single, burst, bracket, timer), image aspect ratio, image quality (RAW, JPEG or both), exposure indicator, ISO speed, shutter speed, aperture, record mode, white balance, composition grid lines and exposure histogram are just some of the available pieces of information in the EVF, all without ever having to move the eye from the viewfinder.

The EVF live view mode also allows a preview of the actual exposure in manual mode. The user can adjust shutter speed and aperture in manual mode and see the actual effect on the recorded exposure in the EVF. In addition to the usual depth of field preview, the GH1 allows a unique shutter speed effect preview, giving the user an accurate preview of the finished image blurring when using a slow shutter speed.

In low light, the EVF has another advantage, in that it can brighten up the scene, allowing the user to see more detail than might typically be possible with a traditional optical viewfinder, the same way TV broadcasts of sporting events at twilight show many more colors and detail than human eye can see.

The EVF has some disadvantages, however. In extremely low light at the sensor limits, image quality degrades into a grainy, and often lagging image. As a result, the GH1 is not strong in extremely low light situations. Although the EVF performs well in low light, and can offer a better view than optical viewfinders, at extremely low light levels, optical viewfinders will have the edge. In burst mode, when the main image sensor must pull double duty recording the image and also feeding a live view to the EVF, image lag may become apparent, and it can be difficult to follow a fast moving object in the viewfinder. As a result, the GH1, as are all current EVF centric MFT cameras, is not a strong action sports camera. With the EVF being an electronic display, the GH1 uses considerably more battery power than the traditional DSLR, requiring more frequent battery changes.

Virtually all the functionality of the EVF is available on the articulated 3-inch (76 mm) LCD panel on the back of the camera. The EVF also has an eye sensor, so that the EVF will turn on almost instantaneously, switching off the LCD panel when the eye is brought up the EVF.

=== LUMIX G VARIO HD 14-140mm/F4.0-5.8 ASPH./MEGA O.I.S. LENS ===
Complementing the GH1 is a purpose built video optimized "kit" super zoom lens, the HD video-optimized LUMIX G VARIO HD 14-140mm/F4.0-5.8 ASPH./MEGA O.I.S. lens. This optical image stabilized (Panasonic brand name "MEGA O.I.S") is video unique because it is near silent in operation, designed with an internal direct-drive linear motor for fast and continuous accurate contrast detect auto focusing, and a silent, step-less (as opposed to the traditional stepped) circular (as opposed to the more traditional hexagonal) aperture diaphragm, ideal for smooth light control so important for video.

The 14-140mm lens is a 35mm camera equivalent focal length of 28mm wide-angle to a 280mm telephoto with manual zoom control. This lens is called a "super zoom" lens because it has a 10x magnification ratio as opposed to the more common and traditional zooms which tend to be in the 3x to 4x range. On larger sensor cameras (APS-C or larger), zoom lens tend to be large and heavy. The micro four thirds sensor provides some advantages in allowing a smaller, lighter, more compact zoom lens design. Even at a hefty (for MFT system lenses) weight at 460 grams, this lens is still relatively compact, includes in-lens optical stabilization and auto focusing, and very good (for a super zoom lens) optical performance. Nevertheless, the video optimized 14-140mm lens has been criticized as being too expensive for a kit lens, costing as much or more as the camera body. When the successor GH2 camera was introduced, Panasonic offered as another option, a much less expensive (and less capable) 3x zoom 14-42mm kit lens, in addition to the 14-140mm 10x zoom lens combination.

=== Body Colors and MSRP ===
The camera was available in three colors — black (suffix K), red (R) and gold (N). In the United States, initial MSRP was US$1500.00 (June 2009) for both the camera body and the 14-140mm kit zoom lens. Later on in the GH1 sales life cycle, the GH1 body only price was US$700.00 and the 14-140mm zoom lens only price was US$850.00

=== Successor Model ===
The GH1's successor, the Panasonic Lumix DMC-GH2 was announced in September 2010.

== Firmware Updates ==
=== Panasonic Releases ===
Panasonic has released the following firmware updates

Version	Release date	Notes
1.0	Original	Original
1.1	2009-06-24	1. Burst speed has become faster. Only when the [BURST RATE] in the [REC] mode menu is set to [H], Burst speed was increased from 3 pictures/second to 3.5 pictures/second.; 2. Shutter speed slower than 1/30 sec. (up to 1/2 sec.) has now become available in the Creative Motion Picture mode. Only when the [EXPOSURE MODE] in the [MOTION PICTURE] mode menu is set to [M], and the focus mode dial is set to [MF].Please note that the shutter speed slower than 1/30 sec. can not be set, when the [REC MODE] in the [MOTION PICTURE] mode menu is set to [AVCHD], and [REC QUALITY] is set to [FHD]; 3. Improved the stability of AF(Auto Focus) in Motion Picture recording.; 4. Improved the stability of [AFC] operation in Focus mode.; 5. Improved the performance of AWB (Auto White Balance).; 6. Improved the S/N figure for the pictures taken with slow shutter speed.; 7. Fixed the instability of operation when the lens is retracted into its barrel, using Olympus Imaging Corporation's M.ZUIKO DIGITAL ED 14-42mm f3.5-5.6 lens.; 8. Fixed the instability of operation, using Olympus Imaging Corporation's M.ZUIKO DIGITAL 17mm f2.8 lens.; 9. Improved the battery identification to assure the safety standards Panasonic uses for our customer's safety.; Warning: After this firmware update your Panasonic Digital Camera cannot be operated by unauthorised 3rd party batteries.
1.2	2009-09-17	1. Improved Auto Focus performance for the subject in low contrast.; 2. Decreased the operation noise of Auto Focus in Motion Picture recording for H-H020 lens. (In order to minimize the operation noise of Auto Focus, the Auto Focus operation speed is reduced in Motion Picture recording.); 3. Improved the stability of AE(Auto Exposure) control for H-ES045 lens(to be introduced in Oct. 2009).
1.3	2010-09-10	1. Improved operation menu for image stabilizer ([OFF] will be added under [STABILIZER] only when LUMIX G VARIO 14–42mm / F3.5-5.6 ASPH. / MEGA O.I.S. (H-FS014042) is attached).; 2. Availability of AF performance in FHD (full HD) movie recording mode with Four Thirds lenses that are compatible with contrast AF.; 3. Improved AF performance in movie recording with LEICA DG MACRO-ELMARIT 45mm / F2.8 ASPH. / MEGA O.I.S. (H-ES045).; 4. Improved modulation accuracy of flash.; 5. Improved AF (auto focus) performance with lenses of other manufacturer.

=== PTool ===
A non-Panasonic utility, PTool has been developed by Vitaly Kiselev and has made available for downloading on his website. PTool can be allows users to remove certain firmware restrictions and change video encoding parameters. Users have collaborated in developing and testing settings known as 'patches' which enhance the video capabilities of the GH1, enabling faster bit rates and improved video quality.

Speculation on internet discussion forums advances the theory that Panasonic purposely restricted the capabilities of the GH1 for fear that the low cost consumer grade camera would begin to encroach on the capabilities of its much more expensive professional video equipment.

Panasonic has not endorsed PTool nor the 'patches', and certain versions of the firmware, notably 1.3, made the camera 'unhackable', that is, until about May 2011, when users developed a work around.

PTool is not for the faint of heart. A careless installation can "brick" the camera, rendering it totally inoperative.

Version	Release date	Notes
GH17; GH13		Ptool 3.56d Latest version

== Recording Formats ==
=== Still Photography Formats ===
Recording File Format	Image Quality	Aspect Ratio	Image Size
JPEG (DCF, Exif 2.3); RAW; DPOF compatible	RAW; RAW+Fine; RAW+Standard; Fine; Standard	4:3 3:2 16:9 1:1	[4:3] 4,000 x 3,000 (L) [12M] 2,816 x 2,112 (M) [5.8M] 2,048 x 1,536 (S) [3M] [3:2] 4,128 x 2,752 (L) [11M] 2,928 x 1,952 (M) [5.5M] 2,064 x 1,376 (S) [2.7M] [16:9] 4,352 x 2,448 (L) [10.4M] 3,072 x 1,728 (M) [5.1M] 1,920 x 1,080 (S) [2M] [1:1] 2,992 x 2,992 (L) [8.7M] 2,112 x 2,112 (M) [4.3M] 1,504 x 1,504 (S) [2.2M]

=== AVCHD Format (.MTS files) ===
Menu Designation	Aspect Ratio	Resolution	Frame Rate	Bit Rate
NTSC FHD	16:9	1080i 1920 × 1080	60i (sensor output is 24 fps)	FHD: 17 Mbit/s
NTSC HD	16:9	720p 1280 × 720	60p (sensor output is 30 fps) (60p done with frame dup)	SH: 17, H: 13, L: 9 Mbit/s
PAL FHD	16:9	1080i 1920 × 1080	50i (sensor output is 25 fps)	FHD: 17 Mbit/s
PAL HD	16:9	720p 1280 × 720	50p (sensor output is 25 fps) (50p done with frame dup)	SH: 17, H: 13, L: 9 Mbit/s

=== M-JPEG Format (.MOV files) ===
Menu Designation	Aspect Ratio	Resolution	Frame Rate	Bit Rate
HD	16:9	1280 × 720	30 frame/s	~8 Mbit/s
WVGA	16:9	848 × 480	30 frame/s	~3.5 Mbit/s
VGA	4:3	640 × 480	30 frame/s	~2.7 Mbit/s
QVGA	4:3	320 × 240	30 frame/s	~0.7 Mbit/s

Preceded by Panasonic Lumix DMC-G1	Panasonic Micro Four Thirds System cameras November 2008–present	Succeeded by Panasonic Lumix DMC-GH2

Brand	Form	Class	2008	2009	2010	2011			2012	2013	2014	2015	2016	2017	2018	2019	2020	2021	2022	2023	2024	2025	2026
Olympus	SLR style OM-D	Professional															E-M1X ^{R}						
Olympus	SLR style OM-D	High-end									E-M1			E-M1 II ^{R}			E-M1 III ^{R}						
Olympus	SLR style OM-D	Advanced							E-M5			E-M5 II ^{R}					E-M5 III ^{R}						
Olympus	SLR style OM-D	Mid-range									E-M10		E-M10 II		E-M10 III			E-M10 IV					
Olympus	Rangefinder style PEN	Mid-range		E-P1	E-P2		E-P3				E-P5		PEN-F ^{R}										
Olympus	Rangefinder style PEN	Upper-entry			E-PL1	E-PL2		E-PL3	E-PL5		E-PL6	E-PL7		E-PL8	E-PL9		E-PL10						
Olympus	Rangefinder style PEN	Entry-level					E-PM1		E-PM2														
Olympus	remote													Air									
OM System	SLR style	Professional																	OM-1 ^{R}		OM-1 II ^{R}		
OM System	SLR style	High-end																				OM-3 ^{R}	
OM System	SLR style	Advanced																		OM-5 ^{R}			OM-5 II ^{R}
OM System	PEN	Mid-range																	E-P7				
Panasonic	SLR style	High-end Video													GH5S				GH6 ^{R}			GH7 ^{R}	
Panasonic	SLR style	High-end Photo													G9 ^{R}						G9 II ^{R}		
Panasonic	SLR style	High-end		GH1		GH2			GH3		GH4				GH5				GH5II				
Panasonic	SLR style	Mid-range		G1	G2		G3		G5		G6		G7	G80/G85			G90/G95						
Panasonic	SLR style	Entry-level			G10													G100			G100D		
Panasonic	Rangefinder style	Advanced							GX1		GX7		GX8		GX9								
Panasonic	Rangefinder style	Mid-range									GM1	GM5	GX80/GX85										
Panasonic	Rangefinder style	Entry-level			GF1	GF2	GF3		GF5		GF6	GF7	GF8	GX800/GX850/GF9		GX880/GF10/GF90							
Panasonic	Camcorder	Professional							AG-AF104														
Kodak	Rangefinder style	Entry-level										S-1											
DJI	Drone	.												Zenmuse X5S									
DJI	Drone	.												Zenmuse X5									
YI	Rangefinder style	Entry-level												M1									
Yongnuo	Rangefinder style	Android camera															YN450M		YN455				
Blackmagic Design	Rangefinder style	High-End Video							Cinema Camera														
Blackmagic Design	Rangefinder style	High-End Video									Pocket Cinema Camera					Pocket Cinema Camera 4K							
Blackmagic Design		High-End Video										Micro Cinema Camera									Micro Studio Camera 4K G2		
Z CAM	Cinema	Advanced											E1			E2							
Z CAM	Cinema	Mid-Range																E2-M4					
Z CAM	Cinema	Entry-Level															E2C						
JVC	Camcorder	Professional										GY-LS300											
SVS-Vistek		Industrial							EVO Tracer														
