= Panasonic Lumix DMC-GH2 =

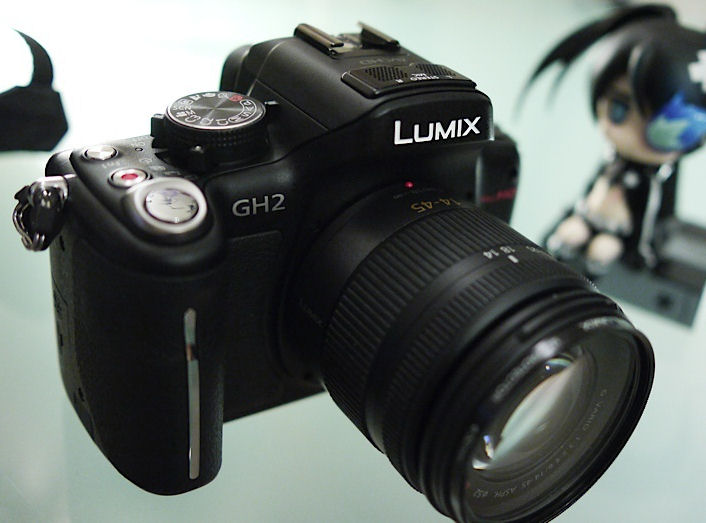
- Panasonic DMC-GH2K

Overview
- Maker: Panasonic Holdings Corporation
- Type: Micro Four Thirds System

Lens
- Lens: Micro Four Thirds System mount

Sensor/medium
- Sensor: 17.3 x 13.0 mm Live MOS
- Maximum resolution: 4592 x 3056 (16.05 megapixels)
- Film speed: ISO 160–12800
- Storage media: SD, SDHC

Focusing
- Focus modes: Automatic or Manual

Exposure/metering
- Exposure modes: Advanced iA (Intelligent Auto), Portrait, Scenery, Close-up, SCN, Manual, Program, Automatic, Shutter Priority, Aperture Priority
- Exposure metering: Intelligent Multiple

Flash
- Flash: Built-in pop up / mount 13.9m GN @ ISO 160
- Flash bracketing: ±2EV EV in ⅓ EV steps

Shutter
- Shutter: Focal-plane shutter
- Shutter speed range: 1/4000 ~ 60 and Bulb (up to approx. 2 minutes)

Viewfinder
- Viewfinder: EVF color display, 100% field of view, 0.71x (35 mm equiv), 1.42x magnification, with 1,533.6K dots equivalent; LCD or articulated multi-angle 3.0 inch color LCD (460,000 dots equivalent)

Image processing
- White balance: Auto / Daylight / Cloudy / Shade / Halogen / Flash / White Set 1, 2, 3, 4 / Color temperature setting

General
- Battery: ID-Security Li-Ion Battery Pack (7.2V, 1200mAh)
- Weight: Approx. 609g / 21.48 oz (SD card, Battery, 14-42 mm lens included); Approx. 904g / 31.88 oz (SD card, Battery, 14-140 mm lens included); Approx. 392g / 13.82 oz (Body only)

The Panasonic Lumix DMC-GH2 is a digital camera with HD video recording capability that is part of the Micro Four Thirds system. Though commonly referred to as a DSLR (digital single-lens reflex) camera, it has no mirror or optical viewfinder, but has instead both a fold-out LCD screen and a (somewhat higher resolution) electronic viewfinder.

The DMC-GH2 can record video at up to HD 1080P at 24 fps. It is notable for offering 1080/50i and 60i (interlaced) recording modes (compatible with broadcasting) as well as 24p, but not 25p and 30p. 1080p30 is supported by a firmware patch since 2012, as well as a significant increase in video/audio bitrate with a significant improvement in video quality. But support for 1080p60, as some articles falsely write, never appeared - the sensor is not fast enough.

== Background comparison ==
The GH2 was released in October 2010 as a successor to the Panasonic Lumix DMC-GH1. The GH2 comes with a touch-screen display, a feature that was not present in the GH1.

The Micro Four Thirds system (with its crop factor of 2 when compared to 35 mm still) does not offer the degree of shallow-focus effects possible with full-frame cameras.

Micro Four Thirds has the same sensor size as the Four Thirds System but replaces the complex optical path needed for the optical viewfinder with an electronic viewfinder displaying a live view; this allows for smaller and lighter lenses and bodies. Like the GH1, the electronic viewfinder (EVF) in the GH2 uses a sophisticated projection system to achieve a clearer, smoother display than that of compact camera EVFs.

As with the GH1, it lacks a separate autofocus (AF) sensor; the GH2 uses contrast-detect autofocus using the readout from the main sensor. HD video mode also uses this purpose-designed contrast-detect AF system. Just like the GH1, the GH2 supports continuous autofocusing while shooting video.

== Features ==
The Micro Four Thirds sensor has about a quarter the area of a 35 mm stills frame, giving a crop factor of about two, so that a "standard lens" may be regarded as around 25 mm focal length. While the sensor is the same size as the Four Thirds system, the flange to sensor distance is much shorter, which as well as allowing small camera size, means that a great variety of camera lenses can be used with an appropriate adapter. In practice, the electronic focus, aperture control, and image stabilising may not work on an adapted lens, so use of an adapted lens is best considered on a case-by-case basis.

Optical image stabilisation is available on Panasonic MFT zoom lenses, and power zoom and power focus is available on some Panasonic X series lenses.

The camera has a dedicated video button and a stereo microphone.

The GH2's electronic viewfinder has been widened compared to the GH1's, increasing the number of dots to 1.53 million from the GH1's 1.44 million. The wider screen better accommodates the GH2's oversize multi-aspect ratio sensor. Use of this oversize sensor ensures that the user can take pictures in 3:2, 4:3 and 16:9 ratios without significant cropping — giving approximately 15.1 MP, 15.9 MP and 13.9MP respectively, compared to the 14.2 MP, 15.9 MP and 11.8 MP that would result from using a "traditional" sensor. An external stereo microphone socket is provided, which, unusually, is 2.5 mm and not the standard 3.5 mm. Manual levels can be set in four stages (6 dB increments).

The camera is available in two colors — black (model suffix K) and gray (model suffix S).

=== Video ===
Recording is to a SDHC or SDXC flash memory card in AVCHD or M-JPEG format, giving up to high quality HD 1080P video at 24 fps with up to 2 hours per take on the USA or Canadian versions (for the European version it's 30 minutes per take maximum due to a European tax on video cameras). The GH2 is also notable for offering 1080/50i and 60i (interlaced) recording modes (compatible with broadcasting) as well as 24p/25p(PAL), 30p are not supported by official versions of firmware, but supported by patch since 2012.

== Compatible lenses ==
The Panasonic GH2 is compatible with the full range of Micro Four Thirds system lenses including:

Wide-angle lens

- Panasonic Lumix G Vario 7–14 mm ƒ/4,0

Standard lens

- Panasonic Lumix G 14–42 mm ƒ/3.5-5.6 Aspheric O.I.S.
- Panasonic Lumix GX Vario PZ 14–42 mm ƒ/3.5-5.6 Aspheric Power O.I.S.
- Panasonic Lumix G Vario 14–45 mm ƒ/3.5–5.6 lens O.I.S. (28–90 mm equivalent)

Telephoto lens

- Panasonic Lumix GX Vario PZ 45-175mm ƒ/4-5.6 Aspheric Power O.I.S.
- Panasonic Lumix G Vario 45–200 mm ƒ/4–5.6 lens (90–400 mm equivalent)
- Panasonic Lumix G HD 100–300 mm f/4,0-5,6 O.I.S.

Super-Zoom

- Panasonic Lumic G Vario HD 14–140 mm ƒ4.0–5.8 (28–280 mm equivalent)

Prime lens

- Panasonic Lumix G 8 mm ƒ/3.5 fisheye lens with a 180° field of view. Lenses support optical image
- Panasonic Lumix G 20 mm "pancake" ƒ1.7 (no image stabiliser) (manual focus slips; no end stops)
- Noktor Hyperprime 50mm f/0.95 lens (announced February 2010) (35 mm EFL = 100 mm) SLR Magic was recently tapped as a new producer of this lens as of May 2011 making it the SLR Magic Hyperprime 50mm F0.95 lens
- SLR Magic Hyperprime 12mm f/1.6 lens (35 mm EFL = 24 mm) (announced November 2011)
- SLR Magic 35mm f/1.7 lens f/1.7 (announced August 2009) (35 mm EFL = 70 mm)
- Toy Lens 11mm f/1.4 lens f/1.4 (announced May 2011) (35 mm EFL = 22 mm)
- Toy Lens 26mm f/1.4 lens f/1.4 (announced December 2010) (35 mm EFL = 52 mm)
- Cosina Voigtländer 25 mm f/0.95 (exceptionally "fast") (no image stabiliser)
- Cosina Voigtländer 17.5 mm f/0.95 (exceptionally "fast") (no image stabiliser)

3D lens

- Panasonic Lumix G 3D lens 12.5 mm / F12 (H-FT012)

Various official mount adapters are available

- Four Thirds System lenses (Four variations of this adapter exist.)
- OM lenses (fully manual) — MF-2
- Leica M mount lenses (fully manual) — DMW-MA2M
- Leica R mount lenses (fully manual) — DMW-MA3R
- Cosina Voigtländer VM mount lenses (fully manual) — VM Adapter
- Carl Zeiss ZM mount lenses (fully manual) — VM Adapter
- Cosina Voigtländer Ai-S mount lenses (fully manual) — Voigtländer F Adapter
- Carl Zeiss ZF mount lenses (fully manual) — Voigtländer F Adapter
- Cosina Voigtländer PK-A/R, KA mount lenses (fully manual) — Voigtländer K Adapter
- Carl Zeiss ZK mount lenses (fully manual) — Voigtländer K Adapter

Many unofficial adapters allow mounting of additional lenses

- Nikon 50 mm AF Nikkor f1.4 (100 mm full-frame equivalent; no image stabiliser; fully manual; solid focus with end stops)

== Firmware updates ==
=== Panasonic releases ===
Panasonic released firmware version 1.1 in October 2011, with a "compatibility update for new Panasonic X class lenses with power zoom (PZ) feature" which enabled the following with them: display of the local length, step zoom, zoom resume, and selectable zoom speed; and a number of other new features and improvements.

=== Third-party firmware modifications (hacks) ===
Non-Panasonic modifications to the camera's firmware, often referred to as hacks, have been developed and posted on the Internet. The firmware modifications offer the following functionality:

- Higher bitrate for video, which improves image detail & motion quality.
- Ability to adjust the allocation of bitrate to motion quality versus image detail quality.
- Higher bitrates for audio, 192 kbit/s to 440 kbit/s
- Pal & 25p framerates
- Unlocked ISO up to 12,800 enables shooting in extremely dark conditions or overcome a slow lens

Reportedly, these firmware modifications do not enhance still shots from the camera, although it has been reported there is the possibility that a future firmware release could enhance stills features and performance.

Modifying a camera with third party firmware is potentially risky. An incorrect application of the third party firmware could render the camera inoperative. There have been anecdotal reports from Panasonic of modified cameras being returned with damaged processors.

One such third-party firmware modification is PTool.

== Video recording formats ==
=== AVCHD format (.MTS files) ===
Menu Designation	Aspect Ratio	Resolution	Frame Rate	Bit Rate
24 H / 24 L	16:9	1080p 1920 × 1080	24p	24 / 17 Mbit/s
FSH / FH (NTSC/PAL)	16:9	1080i 1920 x 1080	60i / 50i (sensor output is 60p/50p)	17 / 13 Mbit/s
SH / H (NTSC/PAL)	16:9	720p 1280 x 720	60p / 50p (sensor output is 60p/50p)	17 / 13 Mbit/s

=== M-JPEG format (.MOV files) ===
Menu Designation	Aspect Ratio	Resolution	Frame Rate	Bit Rate
HD	16:9	1280 × 720	30 frame/s	~8 Mbit/s
WVGA	16:9	848 × 480	30 frame/s	~3.5 Mbit/s
VGA	4:3	640 × 480	30 frame/s	~2.7 Mbit/s
QVGA	4:3	320 × 240	30 frame/s	~0.7 Mbit/s

Preceded by Panasonic Lumix DMC-GH1	Panasonic Micro Four Thirds system cameras November 2009–present	Succeeded by Panasonic Lumix DMC-GH3

Brand	Form	Class	2008	2009	2010	2011			2012	2013	2014	2015	2016	2017	2018	2019	2020	2021	2022	2023	2024	2025	2026
Olympus	SLR style OM-D	Professional															E-M1X ^{R}						
Olympus	SLR style OM-D	High-end									E-M1			E-M1 II ^{R}			E-M1 III ^{R}						
Olympus	SLR style OM-D	Advanced							E-M5			E-M5 II ^{R}					E-M5 III ^{R}						
Olympus	SLR style OM-D	Mid-range									E-M10		E-M10 II		E-M10 III			E-M10 IV					
Olympus	Rangefinder style PEN	Mid-range		E-P1	E-P2		E-P3				E-P5		PEN-F ^{R}										
Olympus	Rangefinder style PEN	Upper-entry			E-PL1	E-PL2		E-PL3	E-PL5		E-PL6	E-PL7		E-PL8	E-PL9		E-PL10						
Olympus	Rangefinder style PEN	Entry-level					E-PM1		E-PM2														
Olympus	remote													Air									
OM System	SLR style	Professional																	OM-1 ^{R}		OM-1 II ^{R}		
OM System	SLR style	High-end																				OM-3 ^{R}	
OM System	SLR style	Advanced																		OM-5 ^{R}			OM-5 II ^{R}
OM System	PEN	Mid-range																	E-P7				
Panasonic	SLR style	High-end Video													GH5S				GH6 ^{R}			GH7 ^{R}	
Panasonic	SLR style	High-end Photo													G9 ^{R}						G9 II ^{R}		
Panasonic	SLR style	High-end		GH1		GH2			GH3		GH4				GH5				GH5II				
Panasonic	SLR style	Mid-range		G1	G2		G3		G5		G6		G7	G80/G85			G90/G95						
Panasonic	SLR style	Entry-level			G10													G100			G100D		
Panasonic	Rangefinder style	Advanced							GX1		GX7		GX8		GX9								
Panasonic	Rangefinder style	Mid-range									GM1	GM5	GX80/GX85										
Panasonic	Rangefinder style	Entry-level			GF1	GF2	GF3		GF5		GF6	GF7	GF8	GX800/GX850/GF9		GX880/GF10/GF90							
Panasonic	Camcorder	Professional							AG-AF104														
Kodak	Rangefinder style	Entry-level										S-1											
DJI	Drone	.												Zenmuse X5S									
DJI	Drone	.												Zenmuse X5									
YI	Rangefinder style	Entry-level												M1									
Yongnuo	Rangefinder style	Android camera															YN450M		YN455				
Blackmagic Design	Rangefinder style	High-End Video							Cinema Camera														
Blackmagic Design	Rangefinder style	High-End Video									Pocket Cinema Camera					Pocket Cinema Camera 4K							
Blackmagic Design		High-End Video										Micro Cinema Camera									Micro Studio Camera 4K G2		
Z CAM	Cinema	Advanced											E1			E2							
Z CAM	Cinema	Mid-Range																E2-M4					
Z CAM	Cinema	Entry-Level															E2C						
JVC	Camcorder	Professional										GY-LS300											
SVS-Vistek		Industrial							EVO Tracer														
