= AVCREC =

- Type: Incentive K.K.
- Industry: high definition
- Genre: Direct-to-video
- Founded: 2007; Japan
- Founder: ISDB
- Headquarters: Japan

AVCREC logo

AVCREC is a format for recording and playback of high definition video in BDAV (Blu-ray Audio/Visual) format using conventional DVD recordable discs as recording media. Presently, AVCREC is tightly integrated with ISDB broadcast standard and is not marketed outside Japan.

== Overview ==
AVCREC was defined in 2007 as the means of recording of high definition ISDB broadcasts on existing DVD recordable discs. Using widespread DVDs offers consumers an immediate economical option for HD content storage on DVDs.

AVCREC is a more economical and simple version of Blu-ray video adapted for set-top device video recording, just like AVCHD is an economical version of Blu-ray video adapted to video cameras.

- October 2007 - Blu-ray Disc Association put together AVCREC specification.
- November 2007 - Panasonic released the first AVCREC recorder.
- March 2008 - Mitsubishi releases its first AVCREC recorder, supporting BD and DVD media.
- May 2008 - Hitachi announced its first BD recorder that supports AVCREC.
- September 2008 - PowerDVD 9 added support for AVCREC playback.
- November 2008 - JVC released its first BD Recorder that supported AVCREC.
- May 2009 - Pioneer released BDP-320 BD player that supported AVCREC.
- August 2009 - Marantz announced upcoming launch of AVCREC-enabled BD player.

An AVCREC recorder can use either MPEG-4/AVC or MPEG-2 video encoding to record the video. In the so-called DR mode a recorder does not re-compress the incoming signal, fully preserving the original quality of a broadcast program. Some devices offer "long play" modes with compression up to 5x higher than original signal, with corresponding loss of quality. MPEG4/AVC is usually used for "long play" modes as a more effective compression scheme compared to MPEG-2.

=== Differences from Blu-Ray Disc Recordable ===
- AVCREC primarily uses DVD media instead of BD-R/BD-RE media, though BD-R/BD-RE media and hard disk drives are used as well.
- AVCREC uses simple menu system, similar to DVD-video
- AVCREC does not support VC1 video codec
- AVCREC Part3 V1.0 requires that all players and recorders are able to play back MPEG-4 AVC video stream when the stream is recorded in the manner of "Transcode mode". According to BD-RE Part 3 V2.1, playback of such streams is only optional.
- AVCREC Part3 V1.0 has been developed to enable recording and playback of BDAV (Blu-ray Audio/Visual) contents on DVD media.

=== Differences from AVCHD ===
- AVCREC primarily uses DVD media, though BD-R/BD-RE media and hard disk drives are used in some devices as well. AVCHD allows for the use of DVD media, Secure Digital memory cards, MemoryStick cards, and hard disk drives.
- AVCREC supports both MPEG-2 and AVC/MPEG-4, while AVCHD supports AVC/MPEG-4 only.
- On DVD media only, AVCHD limits the system bitrate to 18 Mbit/s, which is lower than AVCREC's maximum permitted bitrate. For example, in ATSC HDTV broadcasts, the system bitrate of a channel is 19.2 Mbit/s.

== Playing back AVCREC video ==
Recorded AVCREC video can be played back on a recording device, on a compatible Blu-ray player or on a computer.

== Products ==
=== Pioneer ===
- BDP-LX52, BDP-320

=== Mitsubishi ===
- DVR-BZ200, DVR-BZ200

=== Corel ===
- WinDVD

=== CyberLink ===
- PowerDVD
- PowerProducer
