= Panasonic Lumix DMC-GH3 =

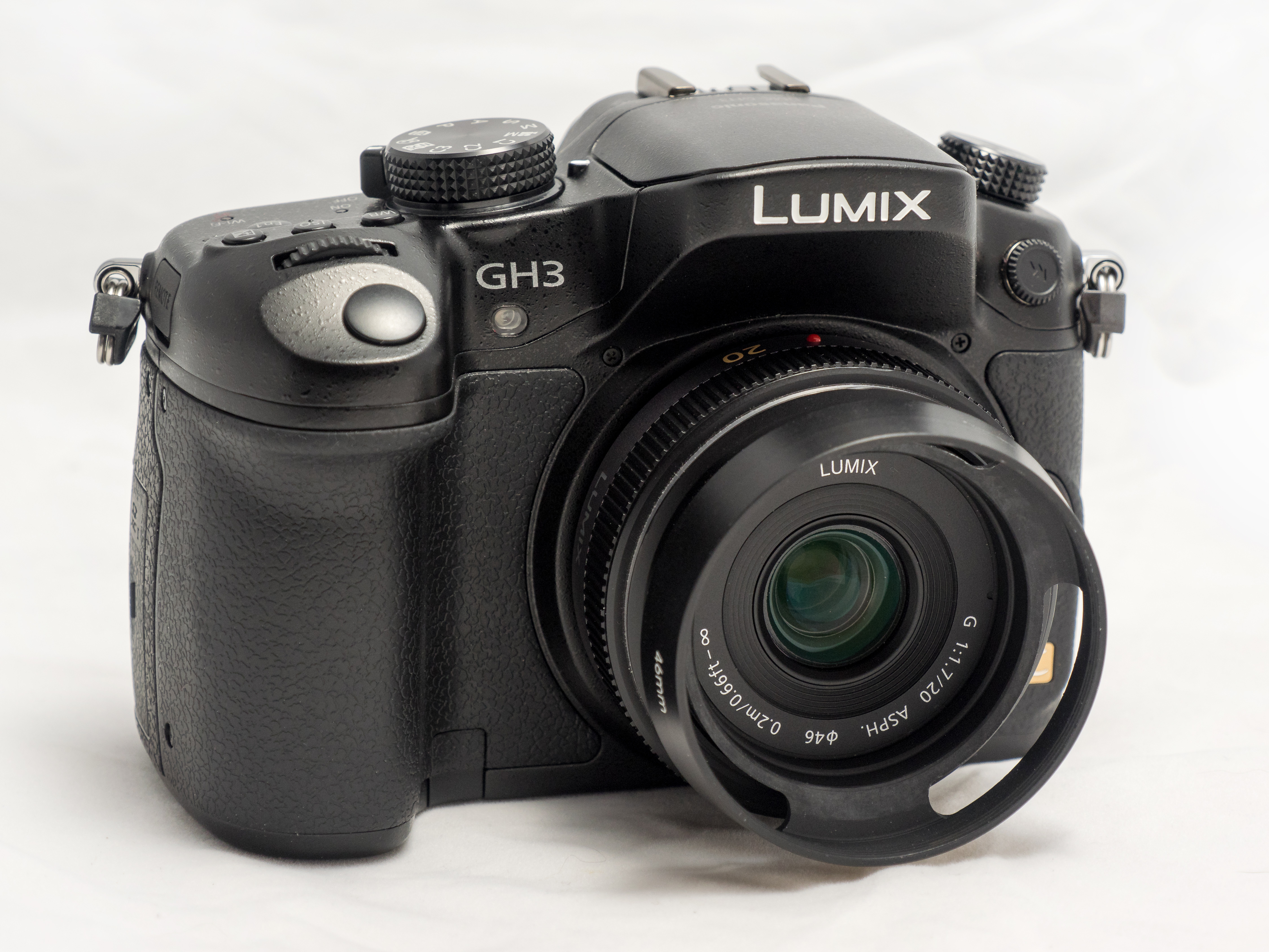
- Panasonic DMC-GH3

Overview
- Maker: Panasonic Holdings Corporation
- Type: Micro Four Thirds System

Lens
- Lens: Micro Four Thirds System mount

Sensor/medium
- Sensor: 17.3 x 13.0 mm Live MOS
- Maximum resolution: 4608 x 3456 (15.93 megapixels)
- Film speed: ISO 200–12800, extendable to 125-25600
- Storage media: SD, SDHC, SDXC

Focusing
- Focus modes: Automatic or Manual

Exposure/metering
- Exposure modes: Manual, Program, Shutter Priority, Aperture Priority, User settings
- Exposure metering: Intelligent Multiple

Flash
- Flash: Built-in pop up
- Flash bracketing: ±2EV EV in 1/3 EV steps

Shutter
- Shutter: Focal-plane shutter
- Shutter speed range: 1/4000 ~ 60 and Bulb (up to 2 minutes)

Viewfinder
- Viewfinder: EVF color display, 100% field of view, 0.67x (35 mm equiv), 1.34x magnification, with 1744 kDots equivalent; OLED or articulated multi-angle 3.0 inch color OLED with touch control (614 kDots equivalent)

Image processing
- White balance: Auto / Color temperature setting / Manual measurement

General
- Battery: Li-ion Battery Pack
- Weight: Approx. 470 g (body only)

The Panasonic Lumix DMC-GH3 is a digital mirrorless interchangeable lens camera (MILC) manufactured by Panasonic. It is the successor to the Panasonic Lumix DMC-GH2 and was announced in September 2012 at photokina. It was available from November 2012.

It is the first MILC that can record video with a bit rate of up to 72 megabits per second. That is significantly higher than the specification of AVCHD 2.0 of up to 28 megabits per second, which was released in July 2011 and is used for similar cameras and camcorders.

It was succeeded by the Panasonic Lumix DMC-GH4 which has the capability to take 4K resolution video.

== Technical specification ==
The camera body is made of a magnesium alloy and has a swivelable touch screen, an electronic viewfinder with diopter correction, an internal flash light and a hot shoe. Due to the short flange focal distance of about 20 millimeters for the Micro Four Thirds system, almost all lenses with an appropriate image circle can be mounted to the body with a lens adapter. The normal focal length is at about 25 millimetres.

In all still and movie modes as well as with the monitor or the electronic viewfinder, the GH3 works in live view mode. It can be operated in manual focus mode with software magnification or with a versatile contrast-detection auto focus system, including face detection and object tracking. This applies to steady shots as well as to movie takes. Due to the optional electronic shutter the camera can take images without any acoustic noise.

The camera body has a lithium ion battery, and an additional battery grip can be attached, which has a release button for portrait shooting, along with other control elements.

The GH3 has an internal stereo microphone and a socket for external microphones.

=== Wi-Fi ===
With a Wi-Fi connection the camera can communicate with smartphones, tablet computers or mobile and stationary computers. These devices allow remote control as well as live view. Furthermore, they can get the geo coordinates of the recording location and add these to the metadata of the recordings. The current Lumix link app does have limitations when recording in video, namely you can start the video recording but not stop it by smart phone or tablet.

The images can be transferred to compatible television sets.

== Use for movie production ==
The ability to take video in Full HD resolution with up to 60 complete frames per second with a bit rate of up to 72 megabits per second and the capacity to use external microphones give the GH3 the potential for semi-professional movie production.

Time-lapse photography and slow motion video can also be made, and flagged by SMPTE time code.

== Properties ==
Compared to its predecessor the GH2 the GH3 has the following main differences:

- Video mode with a Bit rate of up to 72 Megabit per second
- OLED monitor
- OLED viewfinder
- Waterproof and dust-resistant body of a magnesium alloy with additional control elements
- Venus Engine 7
- Image sensor with a different optical low pass filter (with almost the same pixel count)
- Wireless data exchange via Wi-Fi
- Continuous recording of six images per second (raw format), at reduced resolution (4 megapixels) in JPEG up to 20 images per second
- Lowest ISO speed ISO 200, instead of ISO 160
- HDR function

| Preceded by Panasonic Lumix DMC-GH2 | Panasonic Micro Four Thirds System cameras November 2012–present | Succeeded by Panasonic Lumix DMC-GH4 |

| Brand | Form | Class | 2008 | 2009 | 2010 | 2011 | | | 2012 | 2013 | 2014 | 2015 | 2016 | 2017 | 2018 | 2019 | 2020 | 2021 | 2022 | 2023 | 2024 | 2025 | 2026 |
| Olympus | SLR style OM-D | Professional | | | | | | | | | | | | | | | E-M1X ^{R} | | | | | | |
| Olympus | SLR style OM-D | High-end | | | | | | | | | E-M1 | | | E-M1 II ^{R} | | | E-M1 III ^{R} | | | | | | |
| Olympus | SLR style OM-D | Advanced | | | | | | | E-M5 | | | E-M5 II ^{R} | | | | | E-M5 III ^{R} | | | | | | |
| Olympus | SLR style OM-D | Mid-range | | | | | | | | | E-M10 | | E-M10 II | | E-M10 III | | | E-M10 IV | | | | | |
| Olympus | Rangefinder style PEN | Mid-range | | E-P1 | E-P2 | | E-P3 | | | | E-P5 | | PEN-F ^{R} | | | | | | | | | | |
| Olympus | Rangefinder style PEN | Upper-entry | | | E-PL1 | E-PL2 | | E-PL3 | E-PL5 | | E-PL6 | E-PL7 | | E-PL8 | E-PL9 | | E-PL10 | | | | | | |
| Olympus | Rangefinder style PEN | Entry-level | | | | | E-PM1 | | E-PM2 | | | | | | | | | | | | | | |
| Olympus | remote | | | | | | | | | | | | | Air | | | | | | | | | |
| OM System | SLR style | Professional | | | | | | | | | | | | | | | | | OM-1 ^{R} | | OM-1 II ^{R} | | |
| OM System | SLR style | High-end | | | | | | | | | | | | | | | | | | | | OM-3 ^{R} | |
| OM System | SLR style | Advanced | | | | | | | | | | | | | | | | | | OM-5 ^{R} | | | OM-5 II ^{R} |
| OM System | PEN | Mid-range | | | | | | | | | | | | | | | | | E-P7 | | | | |
| Panasonic | SLR style | High-end Video | | | | | | | | | | | | | GH5S | | | | GH6 ^{R} | | | GH7 ^{R} | |
| Panasonic | SLR style | High-end Photo | | | | | | | | | | | | | G9 ^{R} | | | | | | G9 II ^{R} | | |
| Panasonic | SLR style | High-end | | GH1 | | GH2 | | | GH3 | | GH4 | | | | GH5 | | | | GH5II | | | | |
| Panasonic | SLR style | Mid-range | | G1 | G2 | | G3 | | G5 | | G6 | | G7 | G80/G85 | | | G90/G95 | | | | | | |
| Panasonic | SLR style | Entry-level | | | G10 | | | | | | | | | | | | | G100 | | | G100D | | |
| Panasonic | Rangefinder style | Advanced | | | | | | | GX1 | | GX7 | | GX8 | | GX9 | | | | | | | | |
| Panasonic | Rangefinder style | Mid-range | | | | | | | | | GM1 | GM5 | GX80/GX85 | | | | | | | | | | |
| Panasonic | Rangefinder style | Entry-level | | | GF1 | GF2 | GF3 | | GF5 | | GF6 | GF7 | GF8 | GX800/GX850/GF9 | | GX880/GF10/GF90 | | | | | | | |
| Panasonic | Camcorder | Professional | | | | | | | AG-AF104 | | | | | | | | | | | | | | |
| Kodak | Rangefinder style | Entry-level | | | | | | | | | | S-1 | | | | | | | | | | | |
| DJI | Drone | . | | | | | | | | | | | | Zenmuse X5S | | | | | | | | | |
| DJI | Drone | . | | | | | | | | | | | | Zenmuse X5 | | | | | | | | | |
| YI | Rangefinder style | Entry-level | | | | | | | | | | | | M1 | | | | | | | | | |
| Yongnuo | Rangefinder style | Android camera | | | | | | | | | | | | | | | YN450M | | YN455 | | | | |
| Blackmagic Design | Rangefinder style | High-End Video | | | | | | | Cinema Camera | | | | | | | | | | | | | | |
| Blackmagic Design | Rangefinder style | High-End Video | | | | | | | | | Pocket Cinema Camera | | | | | Pocket Cinema Camera 4K | | | | | | | |
| Blackmagic Design | | High-End Video | | | | | | | | | | Micro Cinema Camera | | | | | | | | | Micro Studio Camera 4K G2 | | |
| Z CAM | Cinema | Advanced | | | | | | | | | | | E1 | | | E2 | | | | | | | |
| Z CAM | Cinema | Mid-Range | | | | | | | | | | | | | | | | E2-M4 | | | | | |
| Z CAM | Cinema | Entry-Level | | | | | | | | | | | | | | | E2C | | | | | | |
| JVC | Camcorder | Professional | | | | | | | | | | GY-LS300 | | | | | | | | | | | |
| SVS-Vistek | | Industrial | | | | | | | EVO Tracer | | | | | | | | | | | | | | |
