= IFrame (video format) =

Digital video format developed by Apple Inc.

iFrame logo

iFrame is a digital video format developed by Apple. It is based on existing industry standards, such as AVC/H.264, AAC and QuickTime, and can be used with compatible Mac and PC applications.

The format has been created to simplify video editing. Many non-Apple editing tools do not require conversion of video from source to intermediate format, instead allowing to edit the original videos directly.

Traditionally, Apple video editing tools like Final Cut Pro and iMovie have required conversion of video from its original format into intermediate format such as ProRes 422 or AIC for editing. With iFrame such conversion is no longer needed starting from iMovie '09.

== Overview ==
iFrame video and audio is encoded using lossy compression. Only intraframe compression is enabled; every frame is a stand-alone i-frame. Video is encoded with the AVC/H.264 compression scheme. Audio is encoded with the AAC codec. The compressed audio and video are multiplexed into a QuickTime file.

To reduce data rate and hardware requirements, video frame has size of 960 horizontal by 540 vertical pixels with pixel aspect ratio of 1:1, which results in 16:9 display aspect ratio. Progressive scanning at 30 or 25 frames per second reduces data rate even further, but may result in increased “judder” when compared to the traditional rate of 60 or 50 images per second (fields or complete frames depending on scanning type) used for television broadcast.

As of 2013, Apple has not made detailed information about this recording format publicly available.

== Relation to other technologies ==
Frame size of 960 by 540 pixels – nicknamed qHD – became popular among manufacturers of smartphones, including Apple's own iPhone.

== Hardware products ==
- October 2009: Sanyo HD2000A, FH1A dual cameras
- April 2010: Sanyo Xacti VPC-SH1
- July 2010: Panasonic HM-TA1 HD pocket camcorder
- October 2010: JVC Picsio GC-FM2 pocket camcorder
- December 2010: Panasonic SDX1 camcorder
- February 2011: Canon PowerShot SX230 HS, PowerShot SX220 HS, IXUS 310 HS (a.k.a. PowerShot ELPH 500)
- February 2011: Nikon S9100
- March 2011: Panasonic HDC-HS900, HDC-TM900, HDC-SD900, HDC-SD800, HDC-SD90, HDC-TM90
- May 2011: Panasonic HDC-SD40, HDC-SD41, HDC-TM40
- September 2011: Canon PowerShot SX40 HS
- November 2011: Canon PowerShot S100
- February 2012: Canon PowerShot G1X, PowerShot SX240 HS, PowerShot SX260 HS; Nikon COOLPIX P510
- January 2012: Panasonic HC-V700; Canon 110 HS
- February 2012: Panasonic HC-X900(M)
- May 2012: Nikon AW100
- August 2012: Canon SX160 IS
- September 2012: Canon Powershot SX50 HS
- November 2012: Canon Powershot G15
- January 2013: Nikon Coolpix S9500
- September 2013 Nikon COOLPIX L620
- September 2014: Canon Powershot SX60 HS

== Software products ==
- iMovie
- Final Cut Express, Final Cut Pro X

== See also ==
- 720p
